= Christine Marin =

French politician

Christine Marin (born April 9. 1951 in Feignies) was a member of the National Assembly of France from 2007 to 2012, representing Nord's 23rd constituency, as a member of the Union for a Popular Movement.

The 23rd constituency was abolished in the 2010 redistricting of French legislative constituencies. Marin stood unsuccessfully for the new version of Nord's 3rd constituency, which covered some of the same area as the abolished constituency, in the 2012 election.
