= Jean Michel (politician) =

French politician (1949–2025)

Member of the National Assembly for Puy-de-Dôme's 6th constituency
- In office 12 June 1997 – 19 June 2012
- Preceded by: Gérard Boche
- Succeeded by: Constituency deleted

Personal details
- Born: 28 January 1949; Lapeyrouse, France
- Died: 18 March 2025 (aged 76); Échassières, Allier, France
- Political party: Socialist Party
- Profession: Lawyer

Jean Michel (28 January 1949 – 18 March 2025) was a French politician. He was the member of the National Assembly for Puy-de-Dôme's 6th constituency from 1997 to 2012 as a member of the Socialiste, radical, citoyen et divers gauche parliamentary group.

The constituency was abolished in the 2010 redistricting, with most of the area moved to Puy-de-Dôme's 2nd constituency. Michel did not seek re-election in the 2012 election.

Michel died on 18 March 2025, at the age of 76.
