= Christine Pirès-Beaune =

French politician

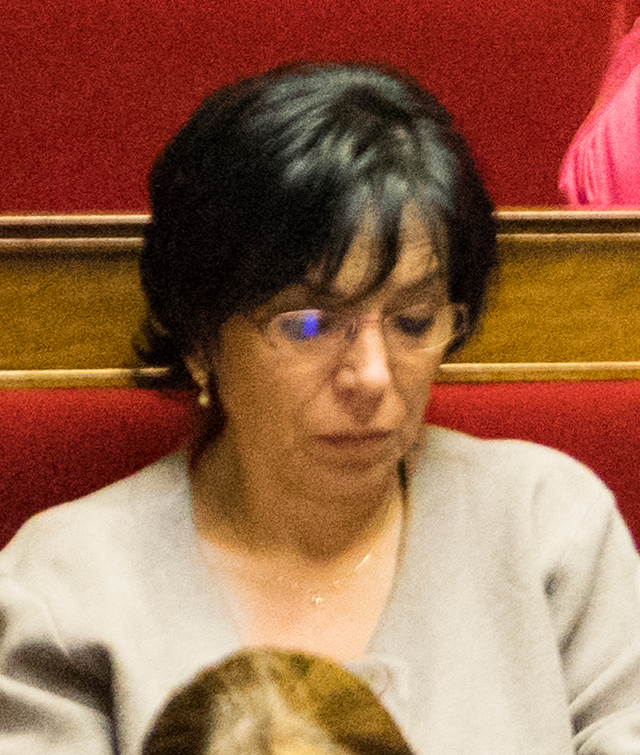
- Parliamentary group: Socialist

Deputy for Puy-de-Dôme's 2nd constituency in the National Assembly of France
- Incumbent
- Assumed office 17 June 2012
- Preceded by: Alain Néri (PS) (2nd constituency); Jean Michel (PS) (6th constituency)

Personal details
- Born: 13 December 1970 (age 55) Saint-Georges-de-Mons (Puy-de-Dôme)
- Party: Socialist

Christine Pirès-Beaune (Note: The name is sometimes spelled Pires-Beaune. The National Assembly website and campaign posters use "Pires-Beaune", while France 3 Auvergne, the Puy-de-Dôme magazine (January 2013 issue, p. 6), Pirès-Beaune's website, or La Montagne use the spelling "Pirès-Beaune".) (French pronunciation: [kʁistin piʁɛs bon]), born 6 October 1964 in Saint-Georges-de-Mons (Puy-de-Dôme), is a French politician of the Socialist Party (PS) who has been serving as a deputy for the second constituency of Puy-de-Dôme since June 2012.

== Early life and career ==
Pirès-Beaune's parents emigrated from Portugal to France in 1960. Her father was a metal worker, at Aubert & Duval, in Ancizes. In 1984, she obtained a Diplôme universitaire de technologie in business management and administration at University of Auvergne Clermont-Ferrand I.

Pires Beaune worked at the planning and development union of Combrailles with Jean Michel and Claude Passavy. From 1998 to 2004, she was chief of staff to Pierre-Joël Bonté, the president of the Puy-de-Dôme General Council. In 2004, Pierre-Joël Bonté was elected president of the Regional Council of Auvergne and Christine Pirès-Beaune remained his chief of staff.

On the death of Pierre-Joël Bonté, in January 2006, Pirès-Beaune became director of financial services for the city of Riom, then general director of city services in 2010.

== Political career ==
=== Early beginnings ===
Pirès-Beaune ran for election for the first time on the socialist list in Volvic in 2008. The socialist list was defeated but Christine Pires Beaune was elected to the municipal council.

=== Member of the National Assembly ===
Pirès-Beaune was the socialist candidate for Puy-de-Dôme's 2nd constituency in the 2012 French legislative election. This constituency was the result of the merging of the previous 2nd constituency with the 6th constituency, which was abolished in the 2010 redistricting of French legislative constituencies. She led the first round with 38.8% of the vote, and won the second round with 59.5%.

Pirès-Beaune sits on the Finance Committee of the National Assembly. In this capacity, she is Special Rapporteur of the Finance Committee responsible for relations with local authorities. In 2017, she also participated in the preparation of the White Paper on prison real estate under the chairmanship of Jean-René Lecerf.

In the 2017 French legislative election, despite trailing Mohand Hamoumou of La République En Marche! by 1.6% in the first round, Pirès-Beaune was easily re-elected with 63.21% of the votes in the second round.

== Political positions ==
In 2023, Pirès-Beaune publicly endorsed the re-election of the Socialist Party's chairman Olivier Faure.
