= Nord's 3rd constituency =

Constituency of the National Assembly of France

3rd constituency of Nord
- inline Constituency of the National Assembly of France

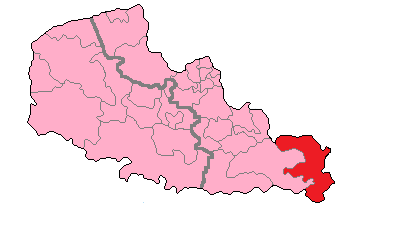
- Nord's 3rd Constituency shown within Nord-Pas-de-Calais
- Deputy: Sandra Delannoy; National Rally
- Department: Nord
- Cantons: Avesnes-sur-Helpe-Nord, Bavay, Maubeuge-Nord, Maubeuge-Sud, Solre-le-Château, Trélon
- Registered voters: 96,578

The 3rd constituency of Nord is a French legislative constituency in the Nord département.

== Description ==
Nord's 3rd constituency covers the south eastern corner of the department around the town of Maubeuge. The seat is wedged between Belgium to the north and Picardie to the south.

Following the 2010 redistricting the seat is now in a completely different place compared to his previous incarnation. The previous 3rd constituency covered the city of Lille. Any historical therefore needs to be made with the now defunct 23rd and 24th constituencies one of which was held by the UMP and one by the Socialist Party prior to 2012. The defeated UMP candidate at the 2012 election Christine Marin had previously represented Nord's 23rd constituency.

== Historic Representation ==
Election	Member	Party
2012	Rémi Pauvros	PS
2017	Christophe Di Pompeo	LREM
2022	Benjamin Saint-Huile	DVG
2024	Sandra Delannoy	RN

== Election results ==
=== 2024 ===
Candidate	Party	Alliance		
Candidate	Party	Alliance	Votes	%
Sandra Delannoy	RN		26,874	50.82
Benjamin Saint-Huile	DVG	NFP	23,429	44.31
Marie-Claude Rondeaux	LO		1,697	3.21
Louis Mahieu	R!		876	1.66
Valid votes			52,876	96.80
Blank votes			1,278	2.34
Null votes			468	0.86
Turnout			54,622	59.62
Abstentions			36,998	40.38
Registered voters			91,620	
Result			RN GAIN FROM DVD	

=== 2022 ===
Legislative Election 2022: Nord's 3rd constituency
Party	Candidate	Votes	%	±%
RN	Sandra Delannoy	11,323	31.18	+4.27
DVG	Benjamin Saint-Huile	6,807	18.74	N/A
PS (NUPÉS)	Sophie Villette	5,510	15.17	−13.77
LREM (Ensemble)	Christophe Di Pompeo	5,455	15.02	−10.12
LR (UDC)	Nicolas Leblanc	4,246	11.69	−0.80
DVE	Marc Dehondt	1,060	2.92	N/A
REC	Jessica Wattiez	1,014	2.79	N/A
Others	N/A	900	2.48	
Turnout		36,315	40.09	−0.70
2nd round result
DVG	Benjamin Saint-Huile	18,448	51.70	N/A
RN	Sandra Delannoy	17,237	48.30	−0.40
Turnout		35,685	40.76	+2.43
DVG gain from LREM				

=== 2017 ===
Candidate	Label	First round		Second round	
Candidate	Label	Votes	%	Votes	%
Sylvie Goddyn	FN	10,040	26.91	16,008	48.70
Christophe Di Pompeo	REM	9,377	25.14	16,861	51.30
Rémi Pauvros	PS	5,498	14.74		
Alain Poyart	UDI	4,658	12.49		
Aurélien Motte	FI	4,144	11.11		
Patrick Viltart	PCF	1,151	3.09		
Marc Dehondt	ECO	635	1.70		
Marie-Claude Rondeaux	EXG	528	1.42		
Franck Lesueur-Bonte	ECO	503	1.35		
Corinne Lairé	EXD	390	1.05		
Bathoche Mahious	ECO	201	0.54		
Nassima Aklil	DIV	176	0.47		
Florence Hudelist	DVD	2	0.01		
Votes		37,303	100.00	32,869	100.00
Valid votes		37,303	97.27	32,869	91.23
Blank votes		748	1.95	2,226	6.18
Null votes		299	0.78	935	2.60
Turnout		38,350	40.79	36,030	38.33
Abstentions		55,659	59.21	57,974	61.67
Registered voters		94,009		94,004	
Source: Ministry of the Interior

=== 2012 ===
Legislative Election 2012: Nord's 3rd constituency
Party	Candidate	Votes	%	±%
PS	Rémi Pauvros	13,158	26.22	−2.51
UMP	Christine Marin	12,189	24.29	−15.28
DVG	Jean-Luc Perat	9,683	19.30	N/A
FN	Louis-Armand De Bejarry	9,321	18.57	+14.80
FG	Fatiha Kacimi	3,069	6.12	N/A
Others	N/A	2,763		
Turnout		50,183	51.96	−3.70
2nd round result
PS	Rémi Pauvros	23,533	52.18	+1.58
UMP	Christine Marin	21,569	47.82	−1.58
Turnout		45,102	46.70	−6.94
PS hold				

=== 2007 ===
Legislative Election 2007: Nord's 3rd constituency
Party	Candidate	Votes	%	±%
UMP	Christian Decocq	14,005	39.57	+7.02
PS	Alain Cacheux	10,168	28.73	−1.27
MoDem	Thierry Pauchet	4,559	12.88	N/A
LV	Philippe Tostain	2,017	5.70	+1.62
FN	Eliane Coolzaet	1,335	3.77	−6.76
Far left	Franck Vandecasteele	1,203	3.40	N/A
Far left	Christian Bernard	1,018	2.88	N/A
Others	N/A	1,086		
Turnout		35,791	55.66	−3.11
2nd round result
PS	Alain Cacheux	16,879	50.60	+4.46
UMP	Christian Decocq	16,479	49.40	−4.46
Turnout		34,490	53.64	−1.19
PS gain from UMP				

=== 2002 ===
Legislative Election 2002: Nord's 3rd constituency
Party	Candidate	Votes	%	±%
UMP	Christian Decocq	11,302	32.55	+0.21
PS	Alain Cacheux	10,417	30.00	+4.21
FN	Georges Petite	3,655	10.53	−5.68
UDF	Thierry Pauchet	3,595	10.35	N/A
LV	Brigitte Merlin	1,415	4.08	−1.86
LCR	Nicole Tacquet-Leroy	820	2.36	N/A
Others	N/A	3,515		
Turnout		35,287	58.77	−0.84
2nd round result
UMP	Christian Decocq	17,063	53.86	+4.30
PS	Alain Cacheux	14,616	46.14	−4.30
Turnout		32,921	54.83	−8.69
UMP gain from PS				

=== 1997 ===
Legislative Election 1997: Nord's 3rd constituency
Party	Candidate	Votes	%	±%
RPR	Claude Dhinnin	10,692	32.34	
PS	Alain Cacheux	8,527	25.79	
FN	Rémi Castermans	5,360	16.21	
PCF	Sylviane Delacroix	2,617	7.92	
LV	Dominique Plancke	1,964	5.94	
DVD	Alexandre Bouche	953	2.88	
GE	Jean-Marie Bauin	687	2.08	
Others	N/A	2,263		
Turnout		34,298	59.61	
2nd round result
PS	Alain Cacheux	17,436	50.44	
RPR	Claude Dhinnin	17,135	49.56	
Turnout		36,547	63.52	
PS gain from RPR				

== Sources ==
Official results of French elections from 2002: "Résultats électoraux officiels en France" (in French).
