= Results of the 2024 French legislative election in Lozère =

Following the first round of the 2024 French legislative election on 30 June 2024, runoff elections in each constituency where no candidate received a vote share greater than 50 percent were scheduled for 7 July. Candidates permitted to stand in the runoff elections needed to either come in first or second place in the first round or achieve more than 12.5 percent of the votes of the entire electorate (as opposed to 12.5 percent of the vote share due to low turnout).

== Lozère ==
=== Sole constituency ===
Candidate	Party or alliance		First round		Second round	
Candidate	Party or alliance		Votes	%	Votes	%
Sophie Pantel	New Popular Front	Socialist Party	15,292	35.17	19,101	43.38
Luc-Etienne Gousseau	National Rally		14,743	33.91	17,347	39.40
Pierre Morel-À-L'Huissier	Miscellaneous right	Independent	10,451	24.04	7,579	17.21
Michel Guiral	Miscellaneous left	Résistons !	2,627	6.04		
Annie Souchon	Far-left	Lutte Ouvrière	284	0.65		
Dja Zidoun	Miscellaneous left	Independent	81	0.19		
Total			43,478	100.00	44,027	100.00
Valid votes			43,478	96.95	44,027	96.46
Invalid votes			453	1.01	505	1.11
Blank votes			914	2.04	1,112	2.44
Total votes			44,845	100.00	45,644	100.00
Registered voters/turnout			59,764	75.04	59,753	76.39
