= Lozère's constituency =

Constituency of the French Fifth Republic

The constituency of the Lozère
- inline Constituency of the National Assembly of France

- Lozère in France
- Deputy: Sophie Pantel; PS
- Department: Lozère
- Cantons: All cantons in the department
- Registered voters: 59,436

The constituency of the Lozère (French: Circonscription de la Lozère) is a French legislative constituency in the Lozère département. Like the other 576 French constituencies, it elects one MP using the two-round system, with a run-off if no candidate receives over 50% of the vote in the first round.

== Description ==
The constituency of Lozère is the only constituency within Lozère, making it one of only two such departments in metropolitan France with a single constituency (along with Creuse). The second constituency was abolished as a result of the 2010 redistricting of French legislative constituencies. Despite this adjustment the electorate in the seat remains low when compared to other constituencies. The last deputy of the second constituency, Pierre Morel-À-L'Huissier, was elected the deputy for the entire department constituency.

== See also ==
- Lozère's 1st constituency

== Deputies ==
Election	Member	Party
2012	Pierre Morel-À-L'Huissier	UMP
2017	Pierre Morel-À-L'Huissier	LR
2018	Pierre Morel-À-L'Huissier	UDI
2022	Pierre Morel-À-L'Huissier	UDI
2024	Sophie Pantel	PS

== Election results ==
=== 2024 ===
Candidate	Party	Alliance	First round		Second round	
Candidate	Party	Alliance	Votes	%	Votes	%
Sophie Pantel	PS	NPF	15,292	35.17	19,101	43.38
Luc-Etienne Gousseau	RN		14,743	33.91	17.34	39.40
Pierre Morel-À-L'Huissier	IND	DVD	10,451	24.04	7,579	17.21
Michel Guiral	R!	DVG	2,627	6.04		
Annie Souchon	LO		284	0.65		
Dja Zidoun	IND	DVG	81	0.19		
Valid votes			43,478	96.95	44,027	96.46
Blank votes			914	2.04	1,112	2.44
Null votes			453	1.01	505	1.11
Turnout			44,845	75.04	45,644	76.39
Abstentions			14,919	24.96	14,109	23.61
Registered voters			59,764		59,753	
Result			PS GAIN			

=== 2022 ===
Legislative Election 2022: Lozère's constituency
Party	Candidate	Votes	%	±%
LFI	Sandrine Descaves	8,637	25.41	−4.11
UDI	Pierre Morel-À-L'Huissier	6,371	18.74	−12.17
LREM	Laurent Suau	5,996	17.64	−4.02
DVD	Patrice Saint-Leger	4,663	13.72	N/A
RN	Jean François Pardigon	3,704	10.90	+3.99
R!	Christophe Castan	2,042	6.01	N/A
REC	Nicolas Pougnet	1,137	3.35	N/A
DVC	Francis Palombi	766	2.25	N/A
Others	N/A	674		
Turnout		33,990	58.37	+0.67
2nd round result
UDI	Pierre Morel-À-L'Huissier	17,355	54.28	−2.33
LFI	Sandrine Descaves	14,620	45.72	N/A
Turnout		31,975	59.22	+10.36
UDI hold				

* LREM dissident

=== 2017 ===
Legislative Election 2017: Lozère's 1st constituency
Party	Candidate	Votes	%	±%
LR	Pierre Morel-À-L'Huissier	10,600	30.91	
LREM	Francis Palombi	7,427	21.66	
PS	Aurélie Maillols	4,495	13.11	
LFI	Christian Causse	3,335	9.72	
FN	Emmanuel Gerstner	2,369	6.91	
PCF	Serge Gayssot	2,294	6.69	
DVD	Régis Turc	2,291	6.68	
Others	N/A	1,485		
Turnout		34,296	57.70	
2nd round result
LR	Pierre Morel-À-L'Huissier	16,440	56.61	
LREM	Francis Palombi	12,601	43.39	
Turnout		29,041	48.86	
LR hold				

=== 2012 ===
Legislative Election 2012: Lozère's 1st constituency
Party	Candidate	Votes	%	±%
PS	Sophie Pantel	13,272	33.08	
UMP	Pierre Morel-À-L'Huissier	11,009	27.44	
UMP	Francis Saint-Léger	7,153	17.83	
FN	Jean-François Pardigon	3,118	7.77	
PCF	Guy Calvier	2,063	5.14	
DVD	Vincent Mathieu	1,703	4.25	
EELV	Claude Lhuillier	1,112	2.77	
Others	N/A	685		
Turnout		40,115	66.96	
2nd round result
UMP	Pierre Morel-À-L'Huissier	20,138	50.52	
PS	Sophie Pantel	19,726	49.48	
Turnout		39,864	66.55	
UMP hold				
