= Anne-Laure Cattelot =

French politician (born 1988)

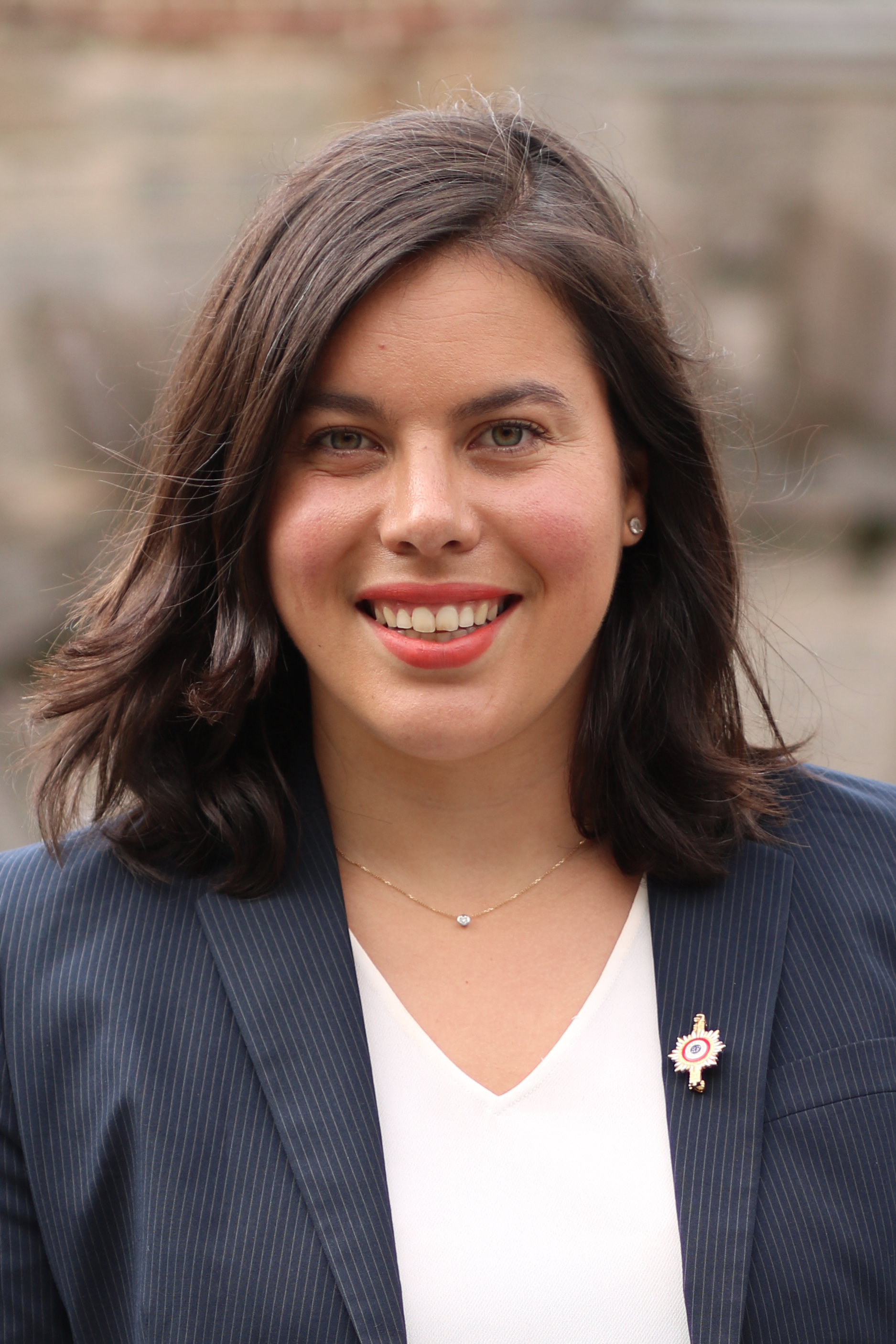
- Anne-Laure Cattelot in 2018

Member of the National Assembly for Nord's 12th constituency
- In office 21 June 2017 – 21 June 2022
- Preceded by: Christian Bataille
- Succeeded by: Michaël Taverne

Personal details
- Born: 25 October 1988 (age 37) Maubeuge, France
- Party: Renaissance
- Education: University of Lille; Sciences Po Lille

Anne-Laure Cattelot (French pronunciation: [an lɔʁ katlo]; born 25 October 1988) is a French politician of Renaissance (RE) who has been serving as a member of the National Assembly of France between 2017 and 2022, where she represents the 12th constituency of the Nord.

== Political career ==
Cattelot was elected to the 12th constituency of the North on 18 June 2017. She won in the second round against the candidate of the National Front. Her predecessor in the constituency, Christian Bataille, beaten in the first round, gave her his support to block the National Front.

In the National Assembly, Cattelot sits on the Finance Committee. She is also a President of the Brewery sector's Working Group.

In 2018, Prime Minister Édouard Philippe entrusted Cattelot with the government's information mission "Industry of the future" to transform French companies by digital, to create the industry of the future.

== Political positions ==
In October 2018, Cattelot denounced the overexploitation of the forest of Mormal by clear cuts and asked for the formation of a commission of inquiry in the National Assembly.

In July 2019, Cattelot voted in favor of the French ratification of the European Union’s Comprehensive Economic and Trade Agreement (CETA) with Canada.

== See also ==
- 2017 French legislative election
