= Raphaël Schellenberger =

French politician

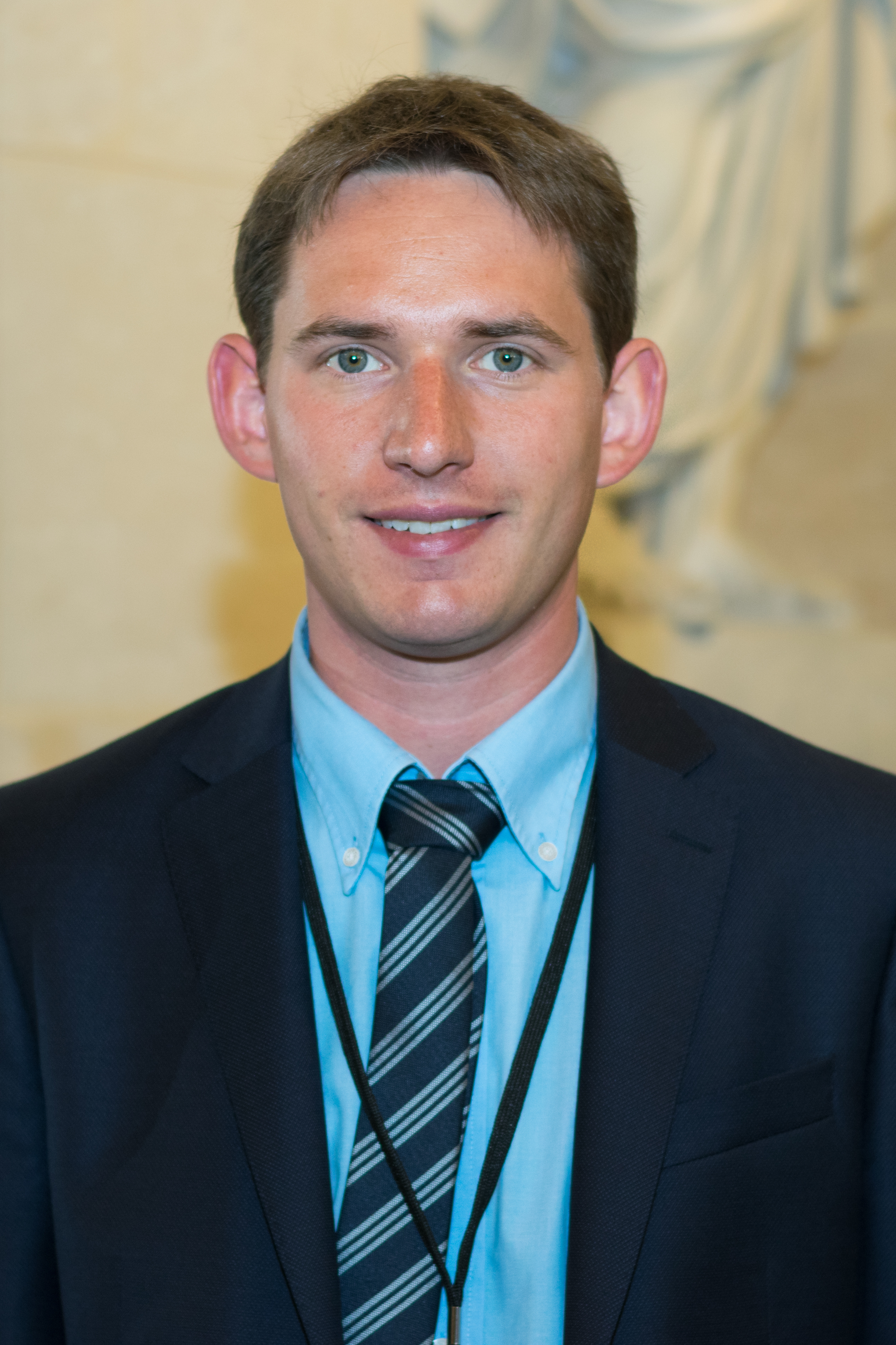

Member of the National Assembly for Haut-Rhin's 4th constituency
- Incumbent
- Assumed office 21 June 2017
- Preceded by: Michel Sordi

Mayor of Wattwiller
- In office 28 March 2014 – 4 December 2017
- Preceded by: Jacques Muller
- Succeeded by: Maurice Busche

Personal details
- Born: February 14, 1990 (age 36) Mulhouse, France
- Party: The Republicans

Raphaël Schellenberger (born February 14, 1990, in Mulhouse) is a French politician of the Republicans (LR) who has been serving as a member of the National Assembly of France since the 2017 elections, representing Haut-Rhin's 2nd constituency,

== Political career ==
Schellenberger was elected to the National Assembly at the relatively young age of 27, having previously served as mayor of Wattwiller. In parliament, he serves on the Committee on Legal Affairs. In this capacity, he was the parliament's co-rapporteur (alongside Bruno Questel) on territorial reforms in 2019. From 2018 until 2020, he was also a member of the Committee on Sustainable Development and Spatial Planning.

In addition to his committee assignments, Schellenberger is part of the French-Austrian Parliamentary Friendship Group. Since 2019, he has also been a member of the French delegation to the Franco-German Parliamentary Assembly.

In 2018, the Republicans' chair Laurent Wauquiez included Schellenberger in his shadow cabinet. Ahead of the party's 2022 convention, he initially endorsed Aurélien Pradié as new chairman; in the second round of voting, he eventually supported Éric Ciotti. In 2023, Ciotti appointed Schellenberger as member of his shadow cabinet and put him in charge of energy policy.

== Political positions ==
In July 2019, Schellenberger voted against the French ratification of the European Union’s Comprehensive Economic and Trade Agreement (CETA) with Canada.
