= Lozère's 1st constituency =

Constituency of the National Assembly of France

- inline Constituency of the National Assembly of France

- The two former constituencies of Lozère

- Lozère in France
- Member: Constituency abolished
- Department: Lozère

The 1st constituency of Lozère (French: Première circonscription de la Lozère) was a French legislative constituency in the Lozère département. It was abolished in the 2010 redistricting of French legislative constituencies, its last deputy was Francis Saint-Léger. From the 2012 election onwards, the entire department was one constituency.
