= Haut-Rhin's 7th constituency =

Constituency of French Fifth Republic

Haut-Rhin's 7th constituency (French: Septième circonscription du Haut-Rhin) was a constituency of the French Parliament. It elected one Member of Parliament and was abolished at the 2010 redistricting of French legislative constituencies. The (pre-2015) cantons of Cernay, Ensisheim and Soultz-Haut-Rhin were attached to the revised 4th constituency, while the canton of Guebwiller was moved to the 2nd.

== MPs ==
- Charles Haby
- 1988-1993 Jean-Pierre Baeumler
- 1993-1997 Michel Habig
- 1997-2002 Jean-Pierre Baeumler
- 2002-2012 Michel Sordi

== Election results ==
=== 2007 ===
In the 2007 French legislative election, Michel Sordi was elected.
