= Benjamin Saint-Huile =

French politician

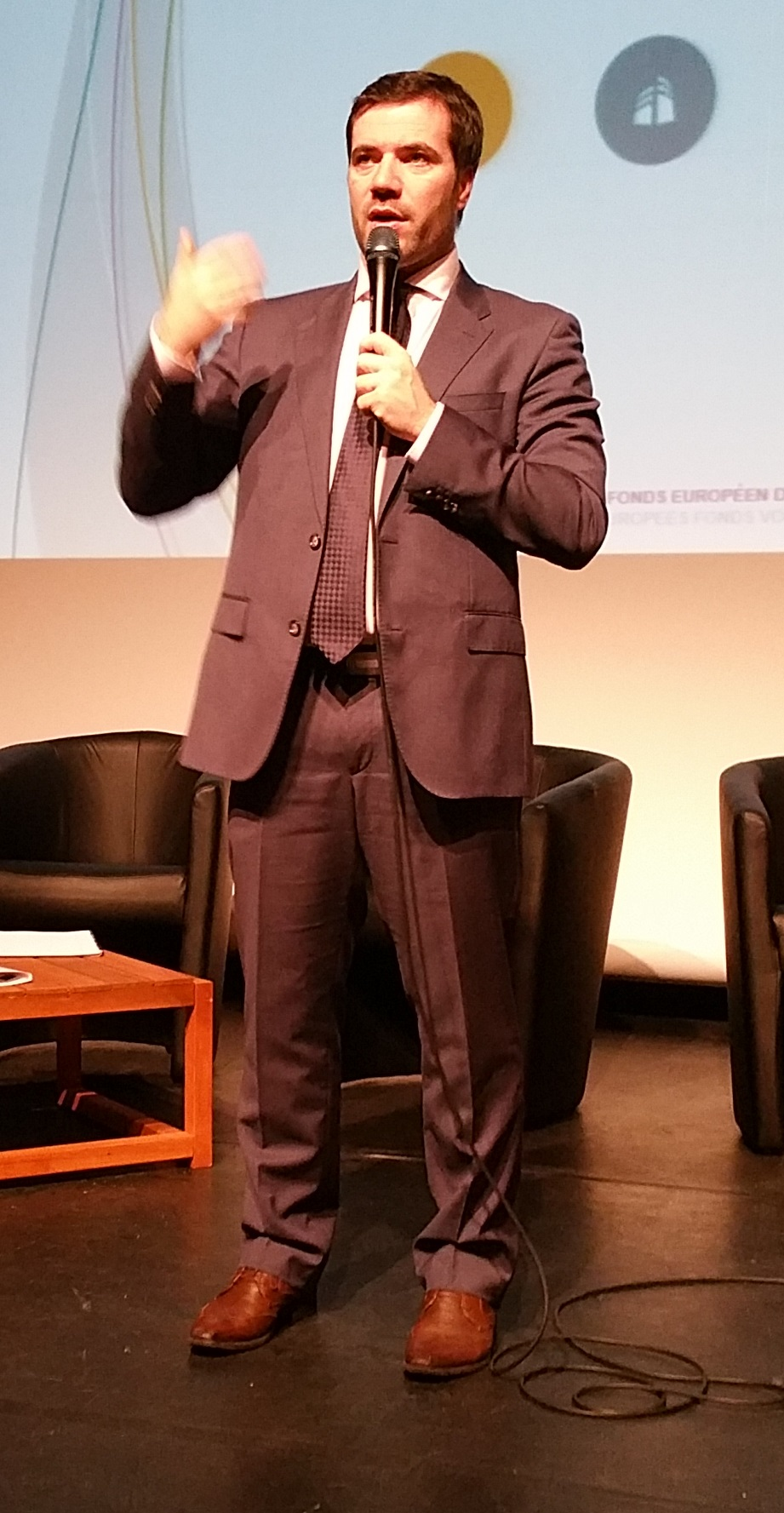

Member of the National Assembly for Nord's 3rd constituency
- In office 22 June 2022 – 9 June 2024
- Preceded by: Christophe Di Pompeo
- Succeeded by: Sandra Delannoy

Personal details
- Born: 10 May 1983 (age 42) Maubeuge, France
- Party: Miscellaneous left (since 2022)
- Other political affiliations: Socialist (until 2022)
- Occupation: politician

Benjamin Saint-Huile (born 10 May 1983) is a French politician from the miscellaneous left. He was elected as the Member of Parliament for Nord's 3rd constituency in the 2022 French legislative election. In the 2024 French legislative election he was unseated in the first round by Sandra Delannoy from National Rally.

== See also ==
- List of deputies of the 16th National Assembly of France
