= Jacques Muller =

Jacques Muller may refer to:

- Jacques Muller (politician) (born 1954), member of the Senate of France
- Jacques Muller (animator) (1956–2018), French animator
- Jacques Léonard Muller (1749–1824), army commander during the French Revolutionary Wars
