= Francis Saint-Léger =

French politician

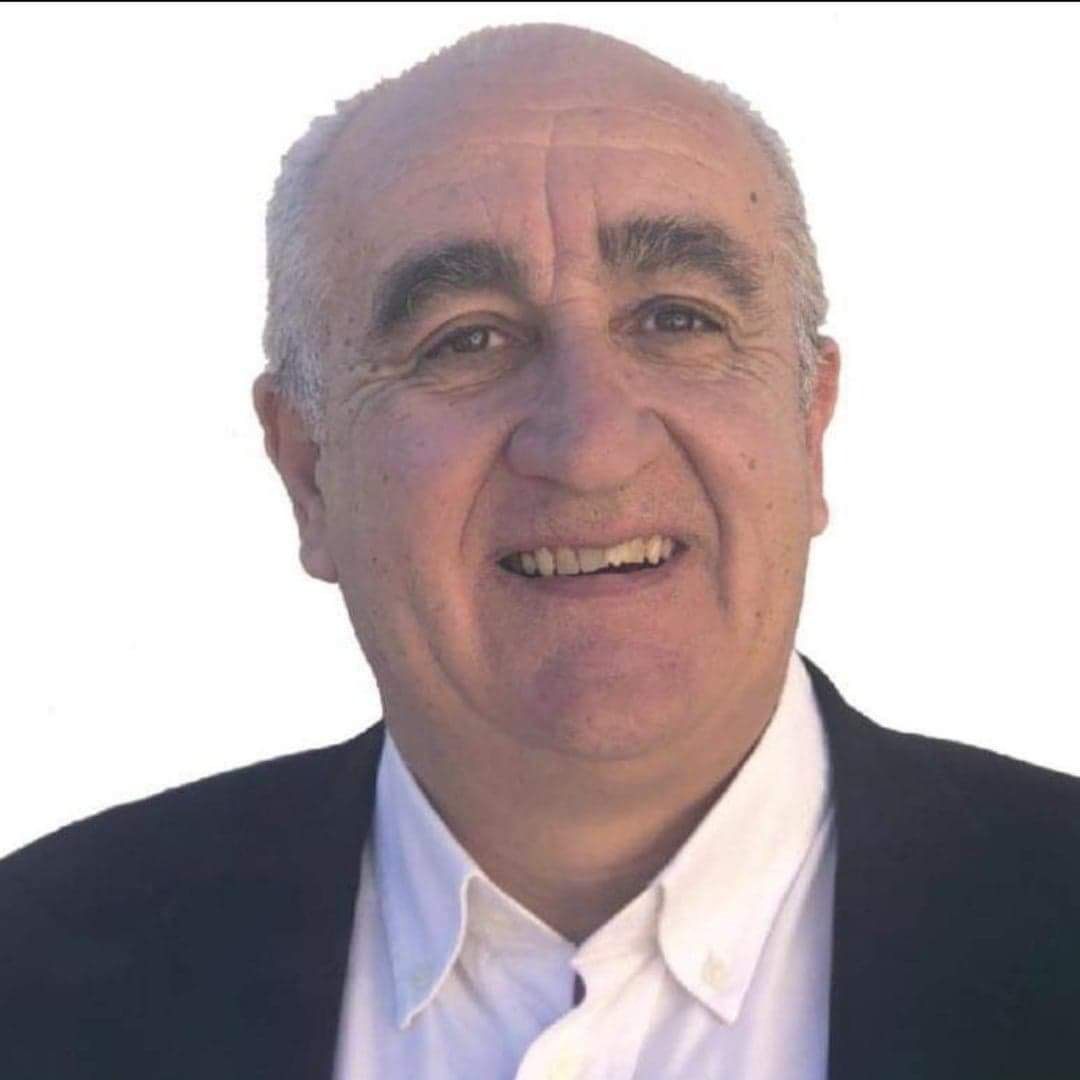
Francis Saint-Léger

Francis Saint-Léger (born 22 February 1957 in Mende, Lozère) was a member of the National Assembly of France. He represented Lozère's 1st constituency as is a member of the Union for a Popular Movement until the 2012 election, when the two Lozère constituencies were combined into one.
