= Sordi =

Sordi is a surname. Notable people with the surname include:

- Alberto Sordi (1920–2003), Italian actor
- Michel Sordi (born 1953), French politician
- Nílton de Sordi (1931–2013), Brazilian footballer
