= Nord's 12th constituency =

Constituency of the National Assembly of France

12th constituency of the Nord
- inline Constituency of the National Assembly of France

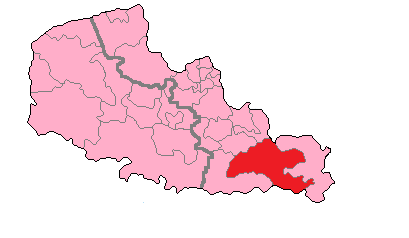
- Nord's 12th Constituency shown within Nord-Pas-de-Calais
- Deputy: Michaël Taverne; RN
- Department: Nord
- Cantons: Avesnes-sur-Helpe-Sud, Berlaimont, Carnières, Hautmont, Landrecies, Le Quesnoy-Est, Le Quesnoy-Ouest, Solesmes
- Registered voters: 93,678

The 12th constituency of the Nord is a French legislative constituency in the Nord département.

== Description ==
Following the 2010 redistricting of French legislative constituencies, Nord's 12th Constituency was effectively created as a new seat covering the areas once occupied by the 22nd and 24th constituencies in the east of the department.

Christian Bataille of the Socialist Party won the seat comfortably in the second round beating the National Front candidate by 7,000 votes.

== Historic Representation ==
Election	Member	Party
2012	Christian Bataille	PS
2017	Anne-Laure Cattelot	LREM
2022	Michaël Taverne	RN

== Election results ==
=== 2024 ===
>

Legislative Election 2024: Nord's 12th constituency
Party	Candidate	Votes	%	±%
LO	Laurent Lehrhaupt	894	1.55	N/A
PCF (NFP)	Bernard Baudoux	11,992	20.80	N/A
DVD	Sébastien Seguin	12,279	21.29	+19.76
RN	Michaël Taverne	31.567	54.74	+20.83
REC	Isabelle Prevost	932	1.62	−2.19
Turnout		57,664	97.02	+52.55
Registered electors		93,070		
RN hold		Swing		

=== 2022 ===
Legislative Election 2022: Nord's 12th constituency
Party	Candidate	Votes	%	±%
RN	Michaël Taverne	13,727	33.91	+9.88
LREM (Ensemble)	Anne Laure Cattelot	11,055	27.31	+3.80
LFI (NUPÉS)	Malik Yahiatene	7,945	19.63	−1.12
LR (UDC)	Claude Dupont	3,268	8.07	−3.55
REC	Simon Flahaut	1,543	3.81	N/A
DIV	Grégory Pamart	1,125	2.78	N/A
DVD	Ludovic Lussiez	821	2.03	N/A
Others	N/A	992	2.45	
Turnout		40,476	44.47	−0.70
2nd round result
RN	Michaël Taverne	20,415	52.82	+6.88
LREM (Ensemble)	Anne Laure Cattelot	18,235	47.18	−6.88
Turnout		38,650	44.31	+2.82
RN gain from LREM				

=== 2017 ===
Candidate	Label	First round		Second round	
Candidate	Label	Votes	%	Votes	%
Gérard Philippe	FN	9,921	24.03	16,230	45.94
Anne-Laure Cattelot	REM	9,710	23.51	19,095	54.06
Laurent Courtois	FI	5,230	12.67		
Marjorie Gosselet	LR	4,799	11.62		
Joël Wilmotte	DVD	3,365	8.15		
Christian Bataille	DVG	3,325	8.05		
Jean Durieux	PCF	2,216	5.37		
Élisabeth Saint-Guily	ECO	1,119	2.71		
Laurent Coulon	DVG	783	1.90		
Jean-Charles Cournut	EXG	313	0.76		
Nadine Fournard	EXD	266	0.64		
Jonathan Pottiez	DIV	247	0.60		
Votes		41,294	100.00	35,325	100.00
Valid votes		41,294	97.66	35,325	90.98
Blank votes		672	1.59	2,451	6.31
Null votes		316	0.75	1,052	2.71
Turnout		42,282	45.17	38,828	41.49
Abstentions		51,328	54.83	54,752	58.51
Registered voters		93,610		93,580	
Source: Ministry of the Interior

=== 2012 ===
Legislative Election 2012: Nord's 12th constituency
Party	Candidate	Votes	%	±%
PS	Christian Bataille	17,270	33.33	
FN	Anne-Sophie Leveque	9,298	17.95	
FG	Bernard Baudoux	7,953	15.35	
DVD	Joel Wilmotte	7,953	15.35	
NM	Etienne Cauchy	6,898	13.31	
Others	N/A	2,336		
Turnout		51,808	55.30	
2nd round result
PS	Christian Bataille	27,129	57.47	
FN	Anne-Sophie Leveque	20,080	42.53	
Turnout		47,209	50.39	
PS gain from DVG				

Note - the constituency covered a different area of the department before 2010

=== 2007 ===
Legislative Election 2007: Nord's 12th constituency
Party	Candidate	Votes	%	±%
DVG	Christian Hutin	13,884	37.08	
UMP	Jacqueline Gabant	8,677	23.17	
DVG	Léon Panier	3,681	9.83	
FN	Yannick Le Floc'h	2,879	7.69	
PCF	Gilles Willeman	1,355	3.62	
MoDem	Pilar Surgers	1,279	3.42	
Far left	Sylvain Madacsi	1,230	3.29	
CPNT	Patrick Lebrun	1,008	2.69	
LV	Martine Beuraert	850	2.27	
Far left	Laure Bourel	833	2.22	
Others	N/A	1,766		
Turnout		38,982	55.41	
2nd round result
DVG	Christian Hutin	23,448	63.95	
UMP	Jacqueline Gabant	13,219	36.05	
Turnout		38,556	54.81	
DVG gain from PS				

=== 2002 ===
Legislative Election 2002: Nord's 12th constituency
Party	Candidate	Votes	%	±%
PS	Jean Le Garrec	12,162	30.45	
FN	Marion Auffray	7,146	17.89	
PR	Christian Hutin	6,841	17.13	
UMP	Hélène Surgers	4,538	11.36	
MNR	Patrick Lorant	1,776	4.45	
CPNT	Michel Szalkiewicz	1,453	3.64	
LO	Laure Bourel	1,071	2.68	
DVD	Marie-Paule Larcy-Debril	1,071	2.68	
PCF	Danielle Veignie	988	2.47	
LV	Nicole Grassien	954	2.39	
Others	N/A	1,940		
Turnout		41,085	58.92	
2nd round result
PS	Jean Le Garrec	22,426	64.19	
FN	Marion Auffray	12,511	35.81	
Turnout		37,984	54.48	
PS hold				

=== 1997 ===
Legislative Election 1997: Nord's 12th constituency
Party	Candidate	Votes	%	±%
PS	Jean Le Garrec	10,782	23.75	
FN	Patrick Lorant	10,342	22.78	
DVD	Christian Hutin	8,192	18.05	
DVG	Régis Fauchoit	6,047	13.32	
PCF	Didier Liennart	3,739	8.24	
LO	Dominique Wailly	2,396	5.28	
DVD	Daniel Dusart	967	2.13	
Others	N/A	2,927		
Turnout		47,966	71.24	
2nd round result
PS	Jean Le Garrec	28,158	64.25	
FN	Patrick Lorant	15,665	35.75	
Turnout		48,582	72.15	
PS hold				

== Sources ==
- Official results of French elections from 1998: "Résultats électoraux officiels en France" (in French).
