= Alain Néri =

French politician

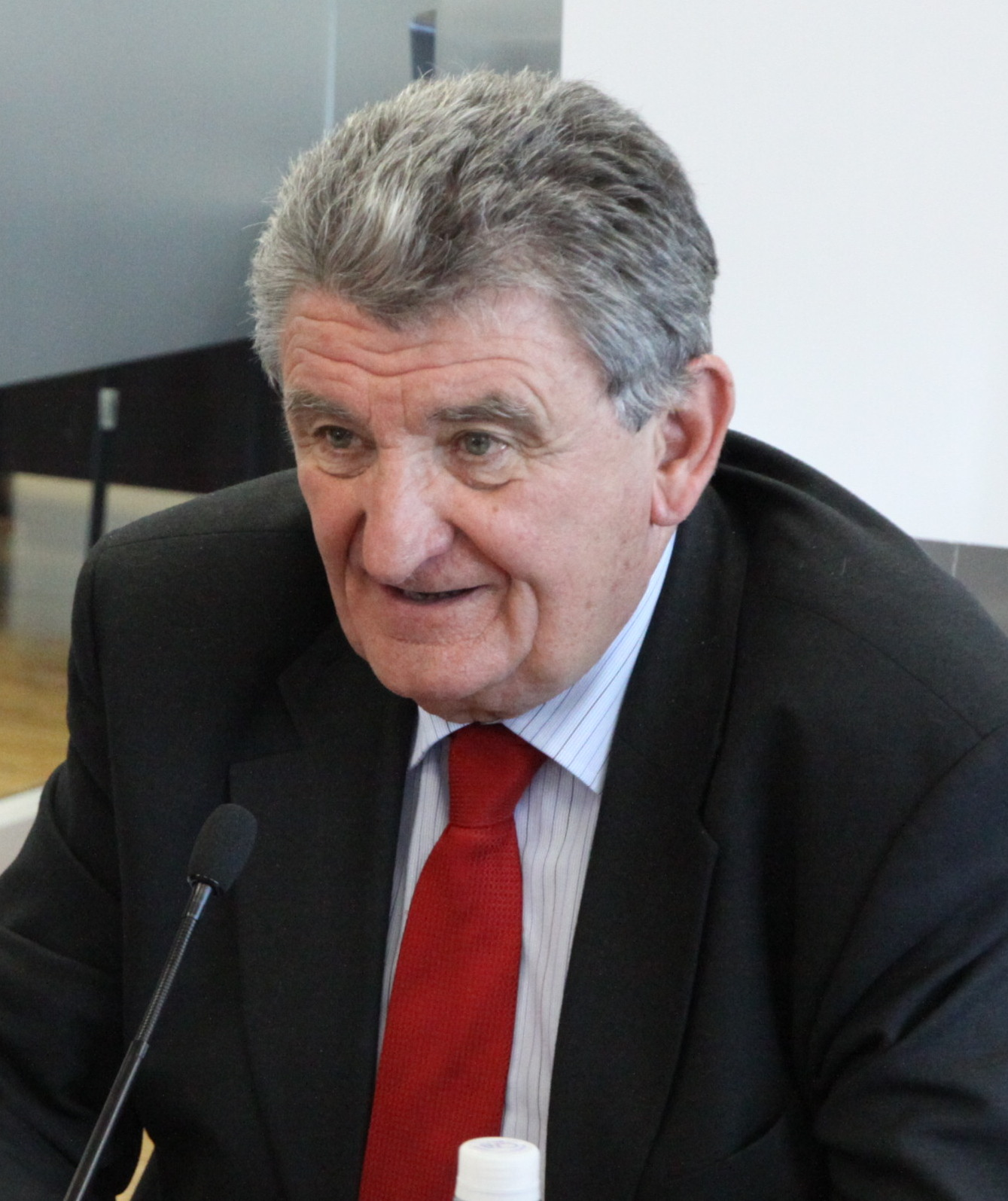
- Alain Néri in 2011

Member of the French Senate for Puy-de-Dôme
- In office 1 October 2011 – 1 October 2017

Member of the National Assembly for Puy-de-Dôme's 2nd constituency
- In office 13 June 1988 – 30 September 2011
- Preceded by: Michel Cartaud
- Succeeded by: Christine Pirès-Beaune

Personal details
- Born: 1 May 1942 (age 84) Clermont-Ferrand, France
- Party: Socialist Party

Alain Néri (born 1 May 1942) is a French politician. He was the deputy for Puy-de-Dôme's 2nd constituency from 1997 to 2011 in the National Assembly of France. He was then senator for Puy-de-Dôme from 2011 to 2017. He is a member of the Socialiste, radical, citoyen et divers gauche.
