= Lozère's 2nd constituency =

Former legislative district of France

- inline Constituency of the National Assembly of France

- The two former constituencies of Lozère

- Lozère in France
- Member: Constituency abolished
- Department: Lozère

The 2nd constituency of Lozère (French: Deuxième circonscription de la Lozère) was a French legislative constituency in the Lozère département. It was abolished in the 2010 redistricting of French legislative constituencies, its last deputy was Pierre Morel-À-L'Huissier, who also represented the one constituency for the whole department from the 2012 election onwards.
