= Christian Bataille =

French politician

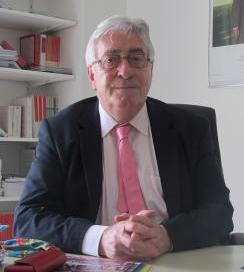
Christian Bataille

Christian Bataille (born 31 May 1946 in Rieux-en-Cambrésis) is a French politician of the Socialist Party (PS) who served as a member of the National Assembly of France, representing the Nord department. In parliament, he was part of the SRC parliamentary group.

== Political career ==
Bataille represented Nord's 22nd constituency from 1988 until the 2012 election (the constituency was abolished in the 2010 redistricting). He later represented the 12th constituency until 2017.

Ahead of the Socialist Party's 2017 primaries, Bataille endorsed Manuel Valls as the party's candidate for the presidential election later that year.
