= Sylvie Goddyn =

French politician (born 1964)

Sylvie Goddyn MEP
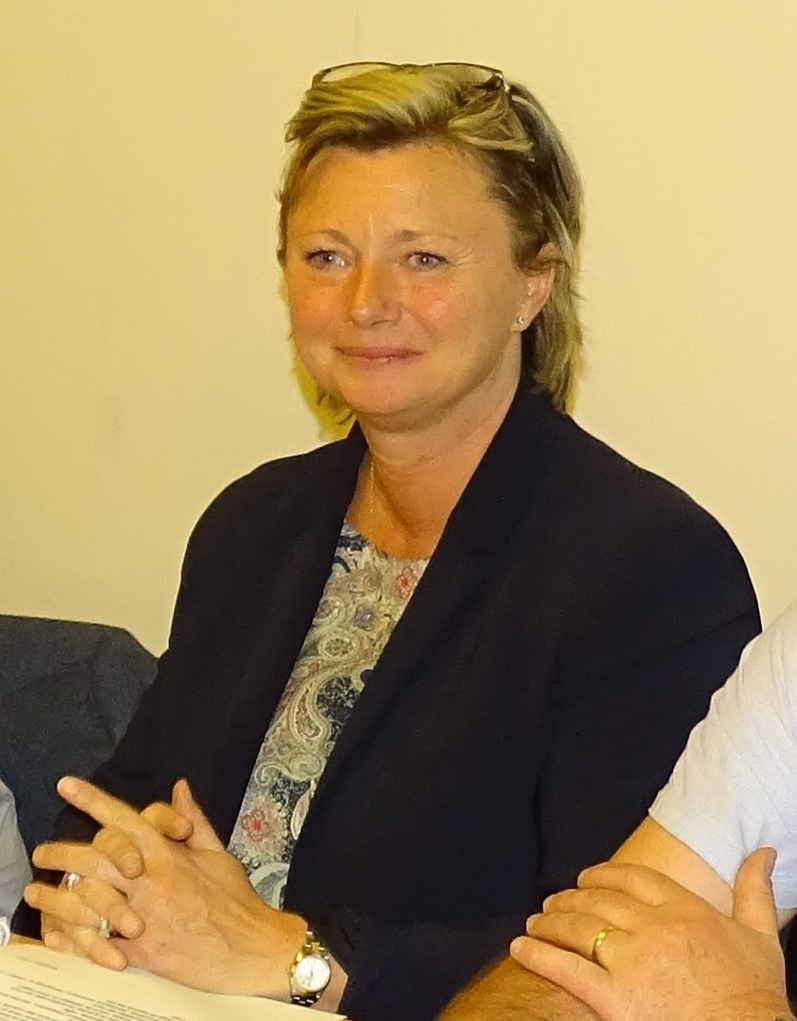
- Goddyn in 2016

Member of the European Parliament for North-West France
- In office 1 July 2014 – 2019

Personal details
- Born: 24 June 1964 (age 61) Lille, France
- Party: National Front

Sylvie Goddyn (born 24 June 1964) is a French politician who was a National Front Member of the European Parliament representing North-West France.

== Life ==
Goddyn joined the right-wing extremist Front National (FN) in 1989. From 2001 to 2008 she was a councilor in the northern French city of Roubaix. From 2004 to 2015 she was a member of the Regional Council of Nord-Pas-de-Calais. Since 2014 she has been represented on the municipal council of Marcq-en-Barœul, a suburb of Lille.

In the 2014 European elections, she was elected to the European Parliament as the representative of the constituency of Northwest France. There she was initially non-attached, from 2015 a member of the right-wing extremist group Europe of Nations and Freedom (ENF). She was a member of the Committee on the Environment, Public Health and Food Safety, the Committee on Petitions (2014–17) and Fisheries Committee (2017–19) as well as a delegate for relations with India.

In the 2017 French legislative election she contested Nord's 3rd constituency but was narrowly defeated by Christophe Di Pompeo from En marche.

Together with her party and parliamentary colleague Philippe Loiseau, she announced in October 2018 that she would support the list of national-conservative Debout la France under Nicolas Dupont-Aignan in the next European elections. She was then excluded from the National Front, which has since been renamed Rassemblement National, and on October 20, 2018, she joined the European Parliament for Freedom and Direct Democracy (EFDD) from the ENF. [1] [2] Ultimately, Goddyn did not run in the 2019 European elections.
