= Sandra Delannoy =

French politician

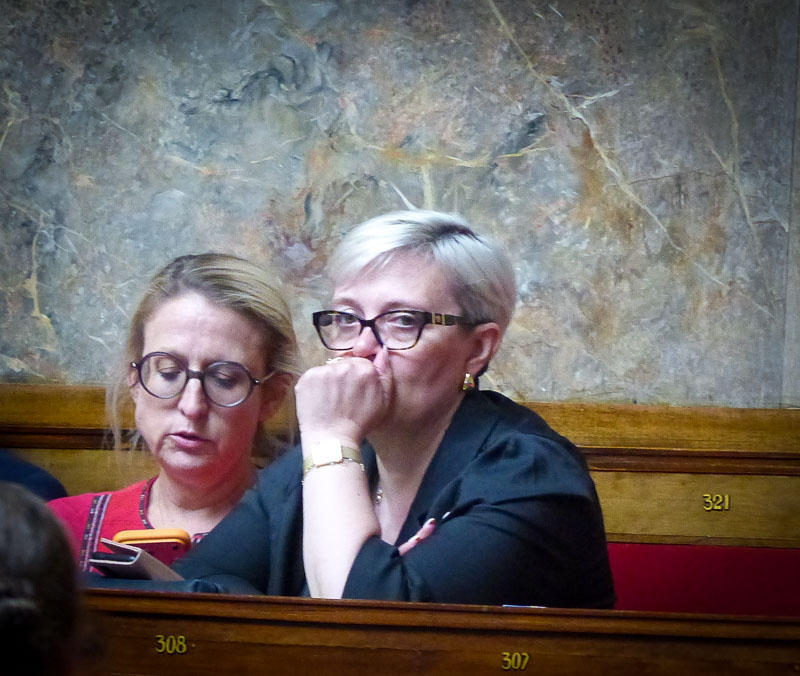

Member of the National Assembly for Nord's 3rd constituency
- Incumbent
- Assumed office 18 July 2024
- Preceded by: Benjamin Saint-Huile

Personal details
- Born: 1 May 1974 (age 52) Valenciennes, France
- Party: National Rally

Sandra Delannoy (born 1 May 1974) is a French politician from National Rally.

== Biography ==
Delannoy was a candidate for the 2024 French legislative election in Nord's 3rd constituency. She won the seat in the first round with 50.83% of the vote unseating incumbent MP Benjamin Saint-Huile. She contested the same constituency in the 2022 French legislative election but was narrowly defeated.
