= Michaël Taverne =

French politician

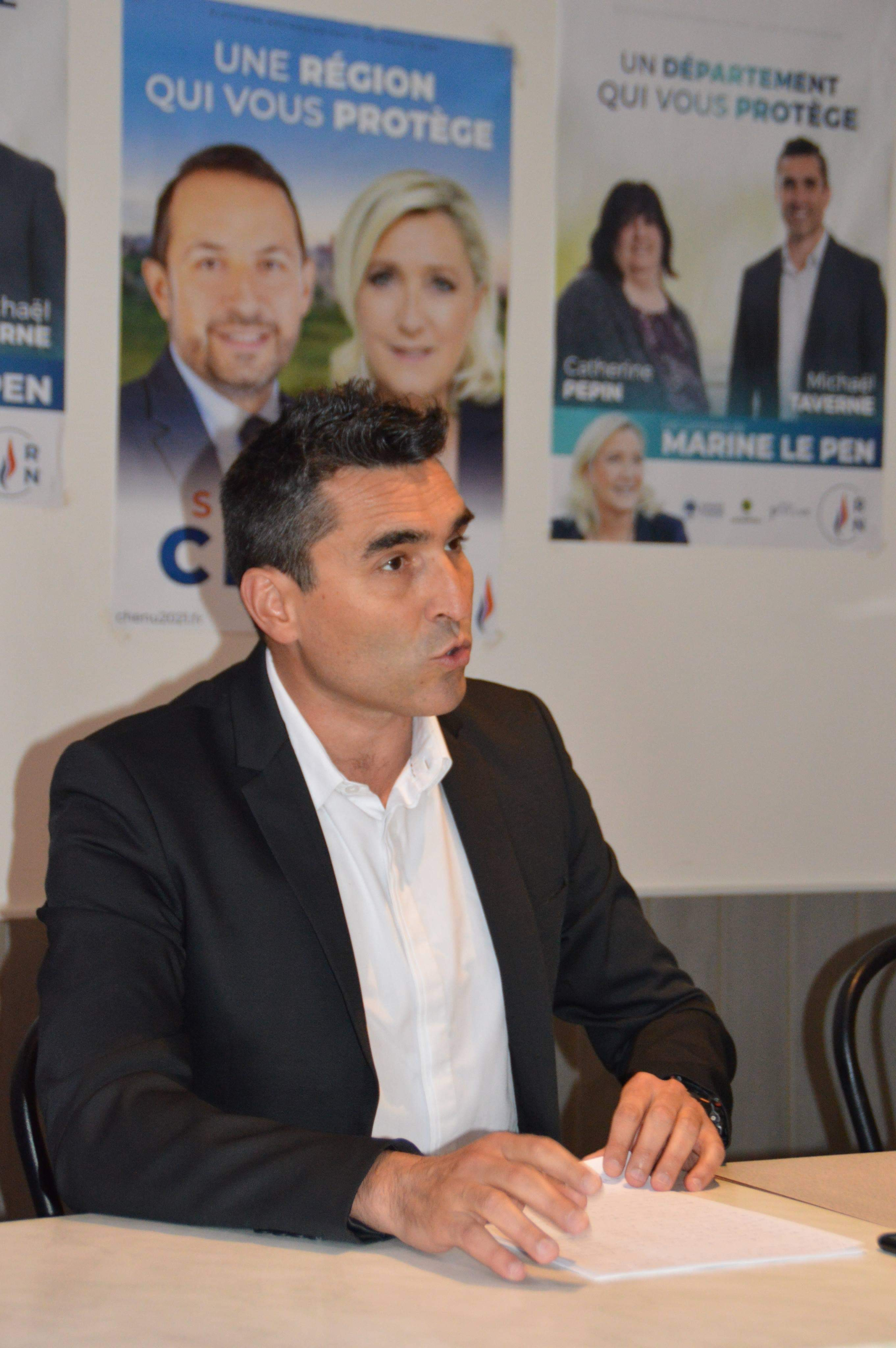
- Michaël Taverne in 2021

Member of the National Assembly for Nord's 12th constituency
- Incumbent
- Assumed office 22 June 2022
- Preceded by: Anne-Laure Cattelot

Personal details
- Born: 10 March 1979 (age 47) Maubeuge, France
- Party: National Rally
- Other political affiliations: Debout la France
- Profession: Police officer

Michaël Taverne (born 10 March 1979) is a French politician of the National Rally. In 2022, he was elected to the National Assembly for Nord's 12th constituency.

Taverne graduated from University with a qualification in STAPS (Bachelor of Science and Techniques of Physical and Sports Activities) and worked as a police officer. He subsequently became a training and firearms instructor for the police at Lille central police station.

He began his political career as an executive for Debout la France and its leader Nicolas Dupont-Aignan before joining the National Rally (RN) in 2019. According to Taverne, the RN is "the only political force that can bring people together" and "win ideas." During the 2022 French legislative election, Taverne contested the seat of Nord's 12th constituency and defeated LREM deputy Anne-Laure Cattelot.
