= Nord's 22nd constituency =

Constituency of the French Fifth Republic

Nord's 22nd constituency was a French legislative constituency in the Nord département. It was abolished in the 2010 redistricting of French legislative constituencies. The last MP was Christian Bataille.
