= Jean-Pierre Baeumler =

French politician (1948–2021)

Deputy of Haut-Rhin's 7th constituency
- In office 1997–2002
- In office 1988–1993

Mayor of Thann
- In office 1989–2014

Regional Councillor for Alsace
- In office 2004–2010
- In office 1986–1998

Personal details
- Born: 1 July 1948 Oberbruck, France
- Died: 22 January 2021 (aged 72)
- Party: PS

Jean-Pierre Baeumler (1 July 1948 – 22 January 2021) was a French politician. A member of the Socialist Party, he served as Deputy, Regional Councillor, and Mayor of Thann.

== Biography ==
From 1984 to 1986, Baeumler served as Chef de Cabinet for Jean-Marie Bockel. He later served as Secretary of the Ministry of Commerce. He was elected Mayor of Thann in 1989, serving until 2014. He also served as Regional Councillor for Alsace from 1986 to 1998, and again from 2004 to 2010.

Jean-Pierre Baeumler died on 22 January 2021 at the age of 71.
