= Pierre Morel-À-L'Huissier =

French politician

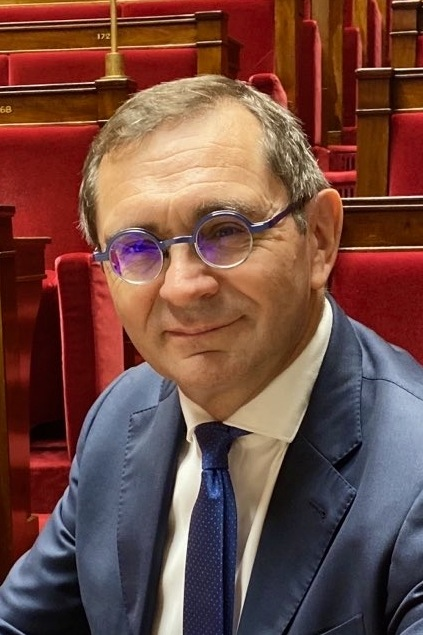
Pierre Morel-A-L'Huissier in 2020.

Pierre Morel-À-L'Huissier (French pronunciation: [pjɛʁ mɔʁlalɥisje]; born December 21, 1958, in Strasbourg) is a member of the National Assembly of France. He represented the Lozère department, as a member of UMP, then the Republicans, then UDI. He was deputy for Lozère's 2nd constituency until it was abolished in the 2010 redistricting of French legislative constituencies. Then from the 2012 election he represented the new constituency for the whole department until 2024.
