= Puy-de-Dôme's 6th constituency =

Constituency of the French Fifth Republic

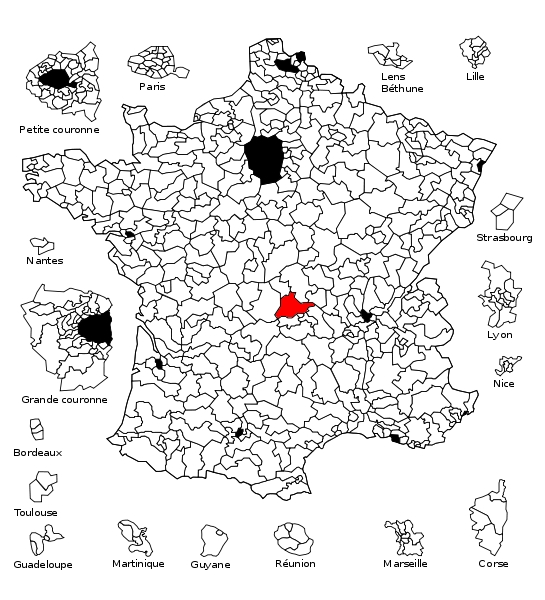
The former 6th constituency of Puy-de-Dôme in red.

The 6th constituency of Puy-de-Dôme was a French legislative constituency in the Puy-de-Dôme département in the Auvergne region of France. It was eliminated in the 2010 Redistricting of French Legislative Constituencies.

The 6th constituency of Puy-de-Dôme was eliminated based on 2010 redistricting mandated by Law No. 86-1197 of 24 November 1986. Before its excision, the 6th constituency consisted of the cantons of Aigueperse, Combronde, Ennezat, Manzat, Menat, Montaigut, Pionsat, Pontaumur, Pontgibaud, Randan, Riom-Est, Riom-Ouest and Saint-Gervais-d'Auvergne. The cantons and communes that once made up the 6th constituency were merged with Puy-de-Dôme's 2nd constituency.

== Assembly Members ==
| Election | Member | Party | Notes |
|---|---|---|---|
| 1988 | Edmond Vacant | PS | Mayor of Mozac |
| 1993 | Gérard Boche | UDF | |
| 1997 | Jean Michel | PS | Mayor of Lapeyrouse |
| 2002 | Jean Michel | PS | |
| 2007 | Jean Michel | PS | Constituency abolished in 2010 Redistricting of French Legislative Constituencies |

== Election results ==
=== 2007 ===
Legislative Election 2007: Pas-de-Calais 2nd - 2nd round
| Party | Candidate | Votes | % | ±% |
|---|---|---|---|---|
| PS | Jean Michel | 31,011 | 54.24 | |
| UMP | Marie-Thérèse Sikora | 26,163 | 45.76 | |
| Turnout | | 59,386 | 67.21 | |
| PS hold | | Swing | | |

== Sources ==
- Official results of French elections from 2007: "Résultats électoraux officiels en France" (in French).
