= 1986 redistricting of French legislative constituencies =

Paris, showing its legislative constituencies between 1988 and 2012

On 24 November 1986, a law was passed in France establishing the eleventh electoral division of French legislative constituencies. These constituency boundaries were used without any modification for national elections from 1988 to 2007. In 2010, these constituencies were abolished and new boundaries were used from the 2012 election.

== See also ==
- 2010 redistricting of French legislative constituencies
