= Christophe Di Pompeo =

French politician

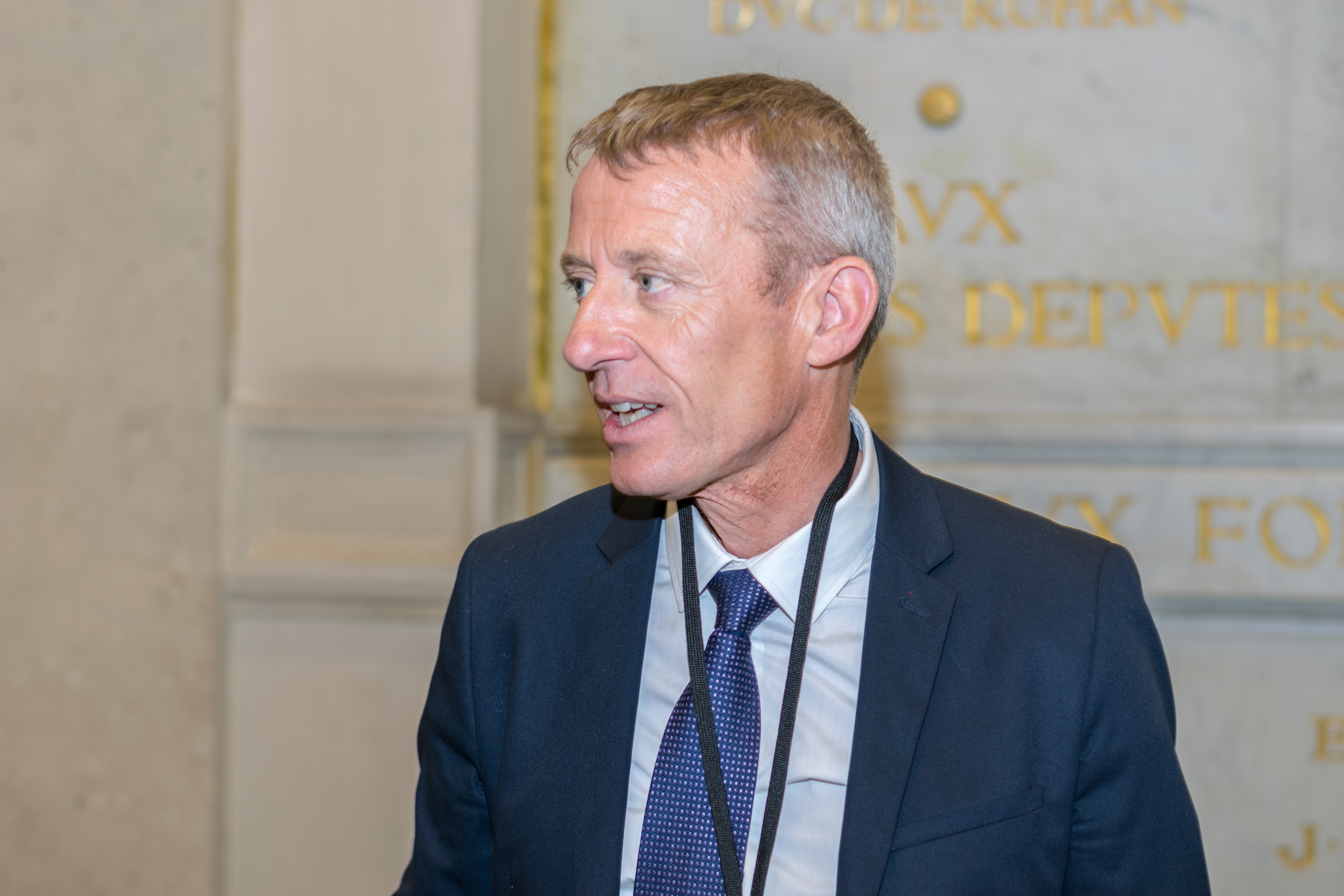
- Christophe Di Pompeo in the National Assembly in June 2017.

Member of the National Assembly for Nord's 3rd constituency
- In office 21 June 2017 – 21 June 2022
- Preceded by: Rémi Pauvros
- Succeeded by: Benjamin Saint-Huile

Personal details
- Born: 15 July 1964 (age 62) Hautmont, France
- Party: Renaissance
- Education: University of Lille

Christophe Di Pompeo (born 15 July 1964) is a French politician who has been serving as a member of the National Assembly since the 2017 elections, representing the department of Nord. He is a member of Renaissance (RE).

== Political career ==
In parliament, Di Pompeo served on the Committee on Foreign Affairs. In addition to his committee assignments, he chaired the French-Italian Parliamentary Friendship Group.

In July 2019, Di Pompeo decided not to align with his parliamentary group's majority and became one of 52 LREM members who abstained from a vote on the French ratification of the European Union’s Comprehensive Economic and Trade Agreement (CETA) with Canada.

In September 2020, Di Pompeo publicly endorsed Christophe Castaner in an internal vote to succeed Gilles Le Gendre as chair of the LREM parliamentary group.

He lost his seat in the first round of the 2022 French legislative election.

== See also ==
- 2017 French legislative election
