= 1959 Comoros by-election =

A by-election to the French National Assembly was held in the Comoros on 31 May 1959. The result was a victory for the List for the Fifth Republic, which won both seats up for election. The two seats were taken by Saïd Mohamed Cheikh and Saïd Ibrahim Ben Ali.

== Results ==
| Party | Votes | % | Seats |
|---|---|---|---|
| List for the Fifth Republic | 48,877 | 100.00 | 2 |
| Total | 48,877 | 100.00 | 2 |
| Valid votes | 48,877 | 99.60 | |
| Invalid/blank votes | 198 | 0.40 | |
| Total votes | 49,075 | 100.00 | |
| Registered voters/turnout | 76,303 | 64.32 | |
Source: Sternberger et al.
