= 1959 French Somaliland by-election =

A by-election to the French National Assembly was held in French Somaliland on 19 April 1959. Hassan Gouled Aptidon was elected as the territory's MP.

== Results ==
Candidate	Votes	%
Hassan Gouled Aptidon	5,906	50.49
Houmed Aboubaker Houmed	5,027	42.98
Abdourahman Djama Hassan	764	6.53
Total	11,697	100.00
Valid votes	11,697	97.52
Invalid/blank votes	298	2.48
Total votes	11,995	100.00
Registered voters/turnout	21,299	56.32
Source: Sternberger et al.
