= Michel Sordi =

French politician

Michel Sordi (born 9 November 1953) is a French politician who was a member of the National Assembly of France. He represented the Haut-Rhin department, as a member of the Union for a Popular Movement. He represented the 7th constituency from 2002 to its abolition in the 2010 redistricting of French legislative constituencies, which was effective at the 2012 election, then the 4th constituency from 2012 to 2017.
