= Sophie Pantel =

French politician (born 1971)

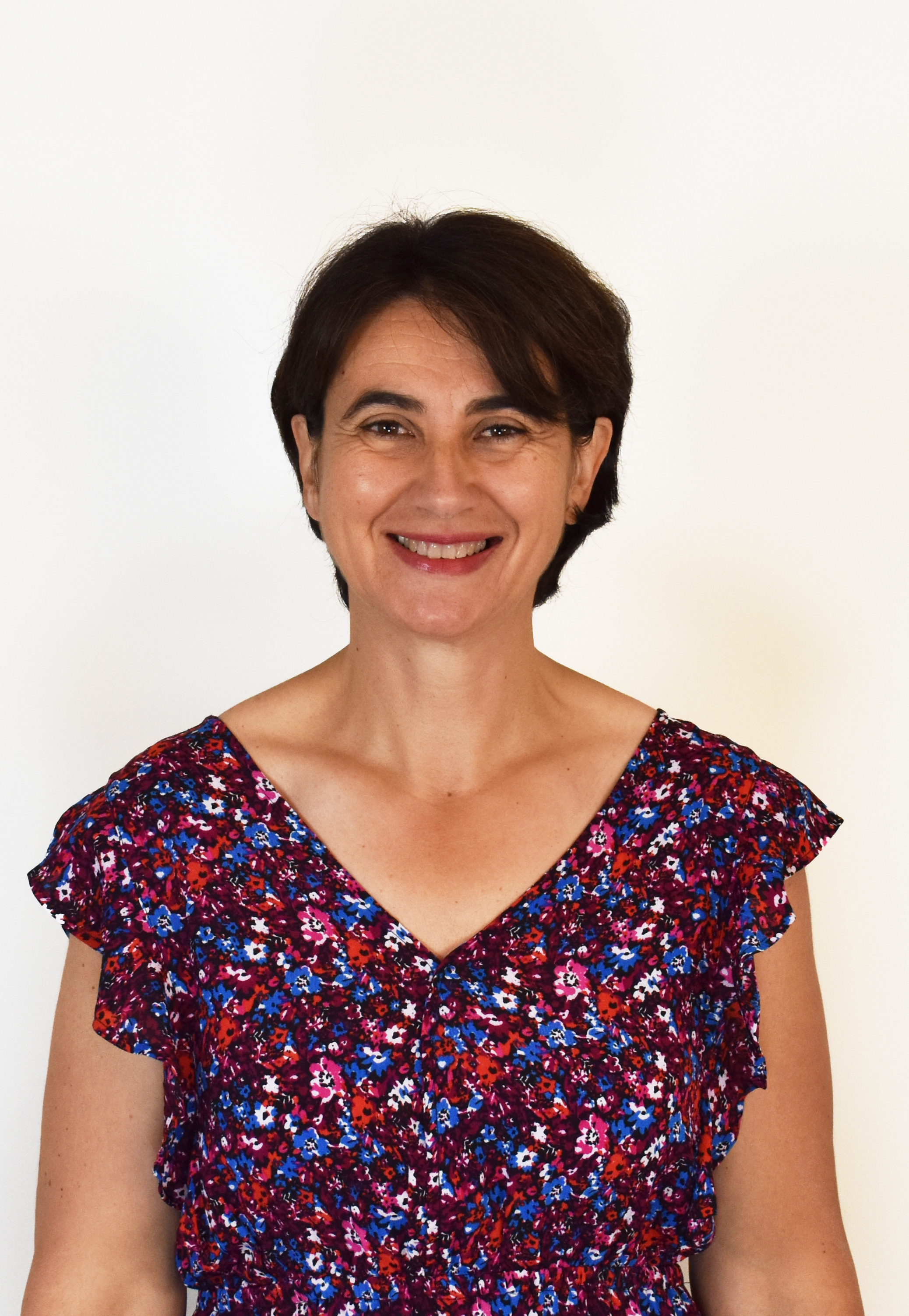
- Pantel in 2021

Member of the French National Assembly for Lozère's constituency
- Incumbent
- Assumed office 18 July 2024
- Preceded by: Pierre Morel-À-L'Huissier

Personal details
- Born: 27 July 1971 (age 53)
- Political party: Socialist Party

Sophie Pantel (born 27 July 1971) is a French politician of the Socialist Party. She was elected member of the National Assembly for Lozère's constituency in 2024.
