= Haut-Rhin's 4th constituency =

Constituency of the National Assembly of France

4th constituency of the Haut-Rhin
- inline Constituency of the National Assembly of France

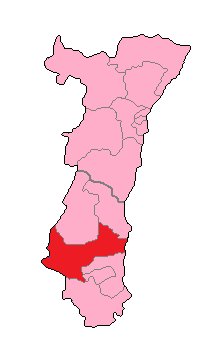
- Haut-Rhin's 4th Constituency shown within Alsace
- Deputy: Raphaël Schellenberger; LR
- Department: Haut-Rhin
- Registered voters: 99,346

The 4th constituency of the Haut-Rhin is a French legislative constituency in the Haut-Rhin département.

== Description ==
Haut-Rhin's 4th Constituency stretches across the width of the departement from the Rhine in the east to the Vosges Mountains in the West. It lies between Colmar and Mulhouse.

Like most of Haut-Rhin it has remained steadfastly conservative throughout the 5th Republic strongly supporting the Gaullist parties. The boundaries of the seat are now radically different following the realignment of French constituencies prior to the 2012 legislative election, which reduced the representation in Haut-Rhin from seven to six members.

In 2022, while all other constituencies in Haut-Rhin saw Gaullist centre-right candidates lose their seats to candidates in the centrist Ensemble Citoyens alliance, Raphaël Schellenberger retained the 4th constituency for LR.

== Historic Representation ==
Election	Member	Party
1958	Henri Ulrich	MRP
1962	Charles Kroepflé	UNR
1967	Raymond Schouler	UDR
1968	Antoine Gissinger	UDR
1973	Antoine Gissinger	UDR
1978	Antoine Gissinger	RPR
1981	Antoine Gissinger	RPR
1986	Proportional representation - no election by constituency	
1988	Jean Ueberschlag	RPR
1993	Jean Ueberschlag	RPR
1997	Jean Ueberschlag	RPR
2002	Jean Ueberschlag	UMP
2007	Jean Ueberschlag	UMP
2012	Michel Sordi	UMP
2017	Raphaël Schellenberger	LR
2022	Raphaël Schellenberger	LR

== Election results ==
=== 2024 ===
Legislative Election 2024: Haut-Rhin's 4th constituency
Party	Candidate	Votes	%	±%
DVE	Corinne Morgen	1,754	2.60	+0.52
LFI (NFP)	Simone Fest	10,352	15.35	+0.04
LR	Raphaël Schellenberger	21,166	31.39	9.14
LO	Aimé Sense	582	0.86	n/a
RN	Marion Wilhelm	30294	44.92	+18.73
REC	Raymonde Diop	871	1.29	−2.08
UL	Maxence Helfrich	2416	3.58	−1.13
Turnout		67,435	97.72	+53.97
Registered electors		104,237		
2nd round result
LR	Raphaël Schellenberger	34,309	50.68	+19.29
RN	Marion Wilhelm	33,393	49.32	4.40
Turnout		67,702	96.38	+55.20
Registered electors		104,252		
LR hold		Swing		

=== 2022 ===
Legislative Election 2022: Haut-Rhin's 4th constituency
Party	Candidate	Votes	%	±%
RN	Marion Wilhelm	11,622	26.19	+9.52
LR (UDC)	Raphaël Schellenberger	9,874	22.25	+0.10
Agir (Ensemble)	Sandrine Mayer	8,469	19.09	−13.70
LFI (NUPÉS)	Chrystelle Garel	6,792	15.31	+2.07
UL (REG)	Guy Baschung	2,089	4.71	−3.78
REC	Ophélie Lefort	1,497	3.37	N/A
DVE	Guillaume Reffay	923	2.08	+0.49
Others	N/A	3,106	-	−
Turnout		44,372	43.75	−0.02
2nd round result
LR (UDC)	Raphaël Schellenberger	22,161	54.98	+4.10
RN	Marion Wilhelm	18,144	45.02	N/A
Turnout		40,305	41.18	+6.28
LR hold				

=== 2017 ===
Legislative Election 2017: Haut-Rhin's 4th constituency
Party	Candidate	Votes	%	±%
LREM	Aurélie Tacquard	14,741	32.79	
LR	Raphaël Schellenberger	7,756	17.25	
FN	Alain Favaletto	7,495	16.67	
REG	David Duss (Unser Land)	3,818	8.49	
LFI	Gabriel Weisser	3,806	8.47	
UDI	Cyrille Ast	2,202	4.90	
EELV	Michel Knoerr	1,735	3.86	
DIV	Alain Bucher	973	2.16	
Others	N/A	2,425		
Turnout		44,951	43.77	
2nd round result
LR	Raphaël Schellenberger	18,234	50.88	
LREM	Aurélie Tacquard	17,604	49.12	
Turnout		35,838	34.90	
LR hold				

=== 2012 ===
Legislative Election 2012: Haut-Rhin's 4th constituency
Party	Candidate	Votes	%	±%
UMP	Michel Sordi	24,978	45.26	
PS	Antoine Home	15,107	27.38	
FN	Raoul Biondi	11,848	21.47	
FG	Nadia Peter-Lantz	1,557	2.82	
Others	N/A	1,693		
Turnout		55,183	55.63	
2nd round result
UMP	Michel Sordi	30,812	63.03	
PS	Antoine Home	18,071	36.97	
Turnout		48,883	49.20	
UMP hold				
