= Jacques Muller (politician) =

French politician

Member of the French Senate for Haut-Rhin
- In office 20 July 2007 – 14 December 2010

Mayor of Wattwiller
- In office 19 March 2001 – 22 March 2014
- Preceded by: Henri Vogelsberger
- Succeeded by: Raphaël Schellenberger

Personal details
- Born: 30 October 1954 (age 71) France
- Party: Europe Ecology – The Greens
- Education: Agro ParisTech

Jacques Muller (born 30 October 1954) was a member of the Senate of France from 20 July 2007 to 13 December 2010, representing the Haut-Rhin department. He is a member of Europe Écologie–The Greens. He is also the mayor of Wattwiller.
