= Puy-de-Dôme's 2nd constituency =

Constituency of the National Assembly of France

2nd constituency of Puy-de-Dôme
- inline Constituency of the National Assembly of France

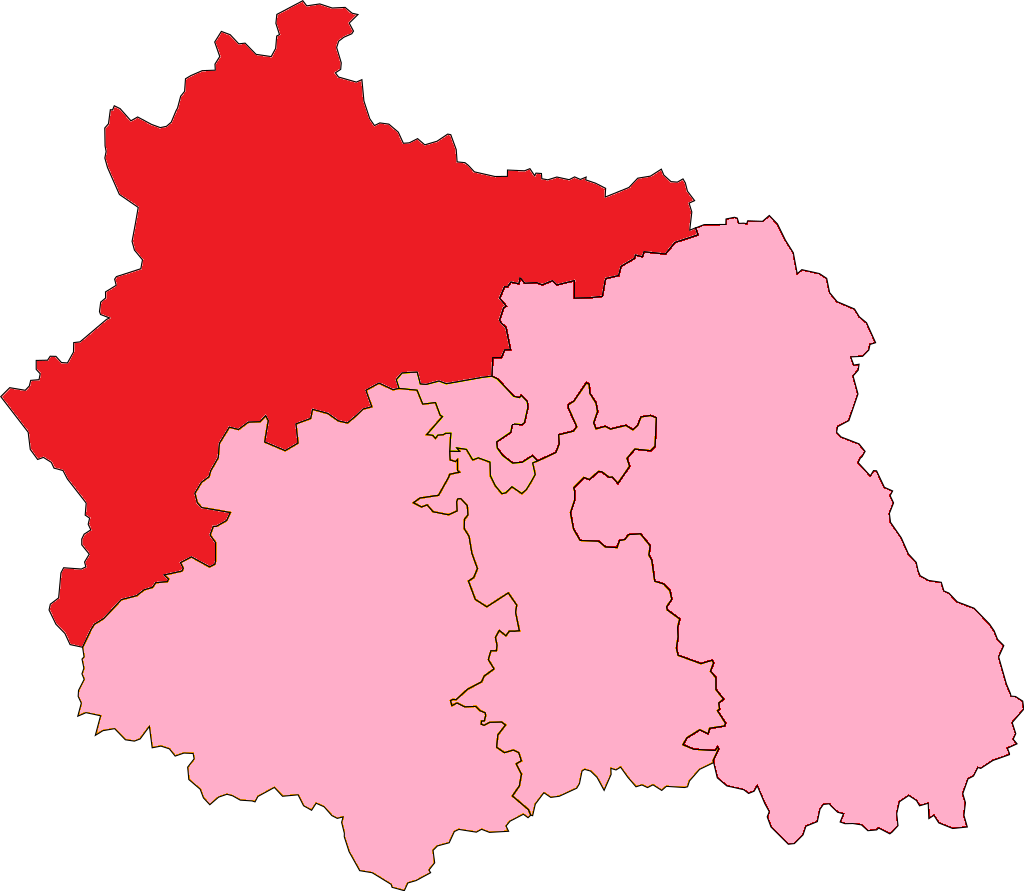
- Puy-de-Dôme's's 2nd Constituency (from 2010 onwards) shown within Puy-de-Dôme
- Deputy: Christine Pirès-Beaune; PS
- Department: Puy-de-Dôme
- Cantons: Aigueperse, Bourg-Lastic, Combronde, Herment, Manzat, Menat, Montaigut, Pionsat, Pontaumur, Pontgibaud, Randan, Riom Est, Riom Ouest, Saint-Gervais-d'Auvergne
- Registered voters: 87873

The 2nd constituency of the Puy-de-Dôme (French: Deuxième circonscription du Puy-de-Dôme) is a French legislative constituency in the Puy-de-Dôme département. Like the other 576 French constituencies, it elects one MP using a two-round electoral system.

== Description ==
Puy-de-Dôme had six constituencies until the 2010 Redistricting of French Legislative Constituencies, which reduced the department's allocation to five. Much of the area of the former sixth constituency was moved into the new second constituency. From 2010, the 2nd constituency of the Puy-de-Dôme covers the northern section of the department including the town of Riom.

In the 2017 legislative election the seat was one of only a few in France that re-elected a Socialist Party deputy.

== Assembly Members ==
Valéry Giscard d'Estaing

Election	Member	Party	Notes
1988	Alain Néri	PS	
1993	Michel Cartaud	UDF	
1997	Alain Néri (Note: Seat vacant from Alain Néri's election as senator for Puy-de-Dôme on 25 September 2011 until the 2012 election.)	PS	
2002	Alain Néri	PS	
2007	Alain Néri	PS	Seat vacant from Alain Néri's election as senator for Puy-de-Dôme on 25 September 2011 until the 2012 election. Note that as a result of the 2010 Redistricting of French Legislative Constituencies the 2nd is now mostly areas previously in the 6th constituency.
2012	Christine Pirès-Beaune	PS	
2017	Christine Pirès-Beaune	PS	
2022	Christine Pirès-Beaune	PS	
2024	Christine Pirès-Beaune	PS	

== Election results ==
=== 2024 ===
Legislative Election 2024: Puy-de-Dôme's 2nd constituency
Party	Candidate	Votes	%	±%
RN	Isabelle Dupré	21,987	34.34	+17.94
LR	Sarah Chauvin	9,044	14.13	−1.17
LO	Franck Truchon	969	1.51	n/a
RE (Ensemble)	Jean-Paul Lebrec	8,203	12.81	n/a
PS (NFP)	Christine Pirès-Beaune	23,175	36.20	−5.64
REC	Marion Godu	645	1.01	−1.44
Turnout		64,023	97.27	+42.80
Registered electors		90,283		
2nd round result
PS	Christine Pirès-Beaune	34,546	56.63	+20.43
RN	Isabelle Dupré	26,453	43.37	+9.03
Turnout		60,999	92.56	−4.71
Registered electors		90,172		
PS hold		Swing		

=== 2022 ===
Legislative Election 2022: Puy-de-Dôme's 2nd constituency
Party	Candidate	Votes	%	±%
PS (NUPÉS)	Christine Pirès-Beaune	20,055	41.84	-1.15
Agir (Ensemble)	Karina Monnet	9,017	18.81	-11.06
RN	Isabelle Dupré	7,862	16.40	+5.85
LR (UDC)	Sylvain Durin	7,332	15.30	+2.62
REC	Aurélien Chabrier	1,172	2.45	N/A
Others	N/A	2,495	-	−
Turnout		47,933	54.41	+0.78
2nd round result
PS (NUPÉS)	Christine Pirès-Beaune	26,613	63.84	+0.63
Agir (Ensemble)	Karina Monnet	15,077	36.16	−0.63
Turnout		41,690	50.49	+1.03
PS hold		Swing	+0.63	

=== 2017 ===
Results of the 11 June and 18 June 2017 French National Assembly election in Puy-de-Dôme's 2nd Constituency
Candidate	Party		1st round		2nd round	
Candidate	Party		Votes	%	Votes	%
Mohand Hamoumou	La République En Marche!	LREM	13,731	29.87	14,515	36.79
Christine Pirès Beaune	Socialist Party	PS	12,536	27.27	24,936	63.21
Pascal Estier	La France Insoumise	FI	7,225	15.72		
Stéphanie Flori-Dutour	The Republicans	LR	5,827	12.68		
Stanislas Chavelet	National Front	FN	4,850	10.55		
Doris Valour	Debout la France	DLF	683	1.49		
Franck Truchon	Far Left	EXG	461	1.00		
Christine Bourdier Buisson	Miscellaneous Left	DVG	381	0.83		
Henri Knauf	Independent	DIV	276	0.60		
Total			45,970	100%	39,451	100%
Registered voters			87,880		87,873	
Blank ballots			754	1.60%	2,480	5.71%
Void ballots			406	0.86%	1,533	3.53%
Turnout			47,130	53.63%	43,464	49.46%
Abstentions			40,750	46.37%	44,409	50.54%
Result					PS HOLD	

=== 2012 ===
Results of the 10 June and 17 June 2017 French National Assembly election in Puy-De-Dome's 2nd Constituency
Candidate	Party		1st round		2nd round	
Candidate	Party		Votes	%	Votes	%
Christine Pires Beaune	Socialist Party	PS	20,299	38.77	30,454	59.52
Lionel Muller	Union for a Popular Movement	UMP	13,817	26.39	20,711	40.48
Pascal Estier	Left Front	FG	7,401	14.14		
Gérald Perignon	National Front	FN	5,827	11.13		
Anne-Marie Regnoux	Democratic Movement	MoDem	1,588	3.03		
Agnès Mollon	Europe Ecology – The Greens	EELV	1,384	2.64		
Gisèle Dupre	New Centre	NC	1,135	2.17		
Dominique Leclair	Workers' Struggle	LO	349	0.67		
Jacques Montel	Independent Ecological Alliance	AEI	301	0.57		
Marie-Françoise Joët	Independent Ecological Movement	MEI	254	0.49		
Audrey Pierrot	Autre	AUT	1	0.00		
Total			52,356	100%	51,165	100%
Registered voters			85,929		86,122	
Blank/Void ballots			986	1.85%	1,828	3.45%
Turnout			53,342	62.08%	52,993	61.53%
Abstentions			32,587	37.92%	33,129	38.47%
Result					PS HOLD	
