= 1981 Corrèze's 3rd constituency election =

← 1978	June 14, 1981	1986 →
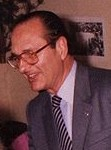

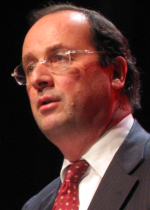
Nominee	Jacques Chirac	François Hollande
Party	RPR	PS
Popular vote	20,464	10,679
Percentage	50.6%	26.4%
Representative before election
Jacques Chirac
RPR
Elected Representative
Jacques Chirac
RPR

The 1981 Corrèze's 3rd constituency election took place on June 14, 1981.

== Election results ==
Corrèze's 3rd constituency election, 1981
Party	Candidate	Votes	%	±%
RPR	Jacques Chirac	20,464	50.60%	−3.69%
PS	François Hollande	10,679	26.41%	+9.34%
PCF	Christian Audoin	8,992	22.23%	−2.40%
FN	Jean Ricard	307	0.76%	+0.76%

== See also ==
- 1981 French legislative election
- Corrèze's 3rd Constituency
