= Nord's 23rd constituency =

Constituency of the French Fifth Republic

Nord's 23rd constituency was a French legislative constituency in the Nord département. It was abolished in the 2010 redistricting of French legislative constituencies.
