= Lapeyrouse, Puy-de-Dôme =

Lapeyrouse
- Commune
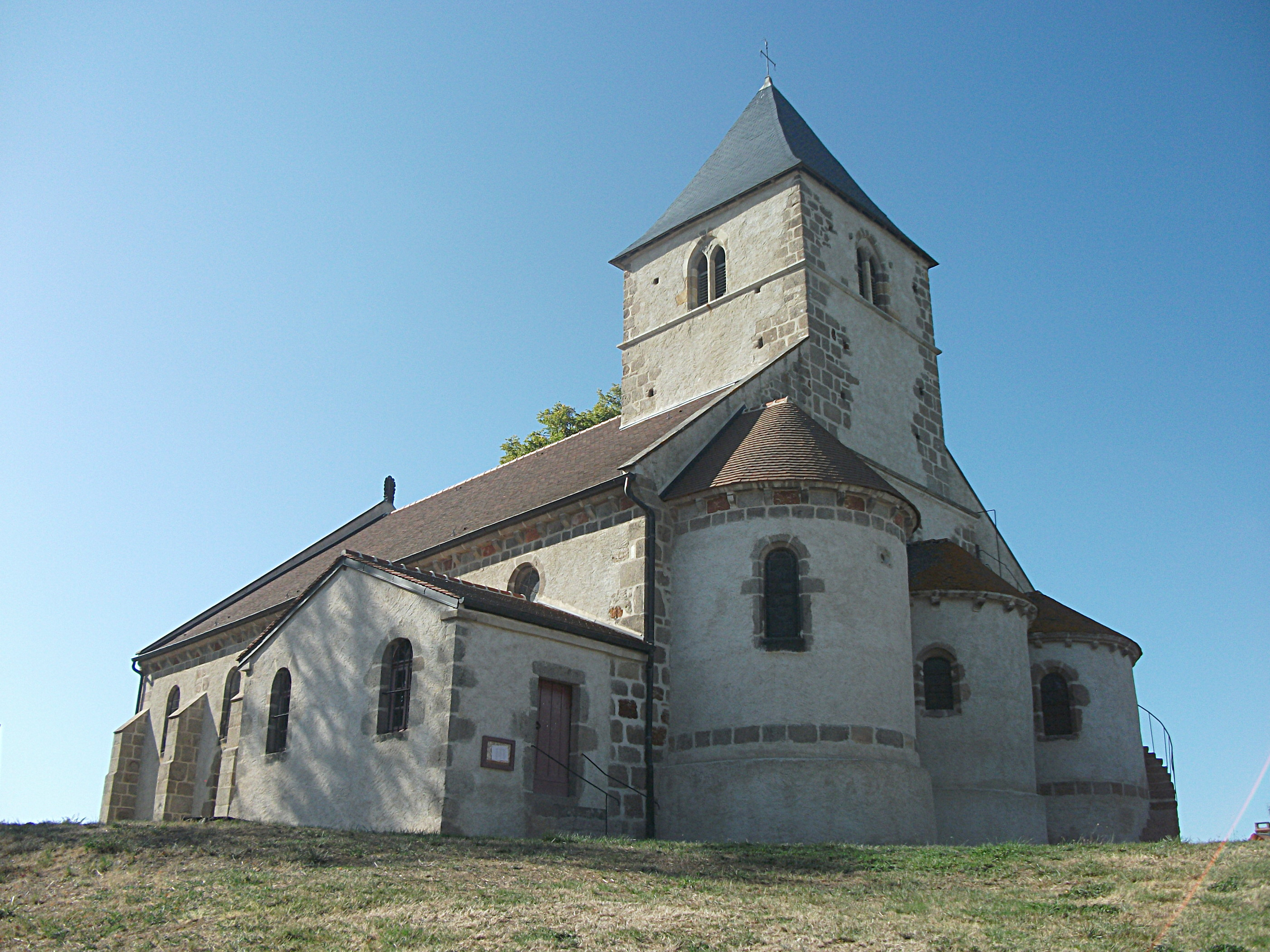
- Church Notre-Dame (12th century)
- Location of Lapeyrouse
- Location within France Location within Auvergne-Rhône-Alpes
- Coordinates: 46°13′30″N 2°52′23″E
- Country: France
- Region: Auvergne-Rhône-Alpes
- Department: Puy-de-Dôme
- Arrondissement: Riom
- Canton: Saint-Éloy-les-Mines
- Intercommunality: CC Pays de Saint-Éloy

Government
  - Mayor (2026–32): Sabine Michel
- Area^{1}: 36.14 km^{2} (13.95 sq mi)
- Elevation: 490 m (1,610 ft)
- Highest elevation: 621 m (2,037 ft)
- Lowest elevation: 390 m (1,280 ft)
- Population (2023): 521
  - Density: 14.4/km^{2} (37.3/sq mi)
- Time zone: UTC+01:00 (CET)
  - Summer (DST): UTC+02:00 (CEST)
- INSEE/Postal code: 63187 /63700
- ^{1} French Land Register data, which excludes lakes, ponds, glaciers > 1 km^{2} (0.386 sq mi or 247 acres) and river estuaries.

Lapeyrouse (French pronunciation: [lapeʁuz]; Occitan: La Peirosa) is a commune in the Puy-de-Dôme department in Auvergne-Rhône-Alpes in central France.

== Geography ==
The river Bouble forms part of the commune's eastern border.

== See also ==
- Communes of the Puy-de-Dôme department
