= 2010 redistricting of French legislative constituencies =

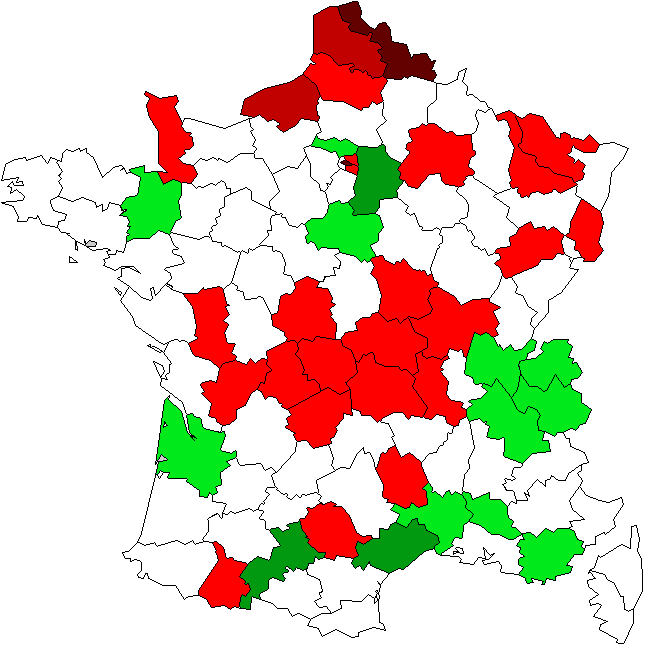
Metropolitan departments losing at least one deputy: one deputy two deputies three deputies Metropolitan departments gaining at least one deputy: one deputy two deputies

The Constitutional Council of France approved the redistricting of electoral boundaries in February 2010 to reflect France's changing demographics. This was the twelfth redistricting to have taken place. The population ratio between the most populated and least populated constituencies was reduced from the 1986 redistricting results of 1:3.6 to 1:2. In effect, the number of seats increased in areas held by the centre-right coalition led by Union for a Popular Movement at the expense of the Socialist-led centre-left coalition. The 2010 redistricting process not only brought down the rule of two deputies per department to one, it also created eleven constituencies for French residents overseas.

== Demographic differences ==
After the redistricting effort of 1986, the 577 constituencies of the National Assembly of France were distributed among the departments of France. Constituencies were divided in proportion to their population, based on 1986 census figures, each consisted of roughly 108,000 inhabitants. In theory, the number of total constituencies located within a department is supposed to be proportional to the larger population within that department compared to the total population of France. In total, there are 101 departments, which are grouped into 22 metropolitan and five overseas regions. However, using French Republican tradition, each department had to have at least two constituencies regardless of population. This, however, distorted the proportionality of national representation, with 23 departments being under-represented (including five of the "two deputies" departments) and 28 departments over-represented. Effectively, 51 out of 101 departments were poorly represented based on the results of the then-most recent census.

A review of electoral boundaries will be conducted, based on demographic changes, after the second general census of the population following the previous border definition.

— Article 2, Law No. 86-825 of 11 July 1986

For instance, judging by representation in the National Assembly, the vote of someone in Lozère was worth more than three times the vote of someone in Bouches-du-Rhône; three votes in Saône-et-Loire were worth five votes in Réunion; and three votes in Moselle were equivalent to five Haute-Garonne. The 25 most populous departments – which together held more than 50% of the French population – had one deputy in the National Assembly for every 114,512 inhabitants, while the 25 least populated departments had one deputy for every 80,220 inhabitants. This results in a ratio between the most and the least populated of 143 to 100, or, five residents for the smaller departments are worth seven resident in the major departments. The situation was exacerbated by demographic trends in the 1990s and their resulting disparities within departments. Notably, in the Var, the population of the 1st constituency (the southern city of Toulon) was 73,946 inhabitants while that of the 6th constituency (Brignoles) was 180,153 inhabitants, resulting in a ratio of 1 to 2.44. These causes result in the most extreme expression of representational inequality, where the votes of two people living in the least-populated constituency of France (excluding overseas France), Lozère's 2nd constituency, weigh as much as eleven people in the most populous constituency, Val-d'Oise's 2nd constituency.

In observations made in May 2003 regarding the 2002 parliamentary elections as well as in July 2005 relating the presidential and parliamentary elections of 2007, the Constitutional Council highlighted the need to reshape electoral constituencies to better align with the principle of equal suffrage. The Council found disparities in representation resulting from the boundaries that were adopted in 1986 on the basis of population figures from the census of 1982. According to the Council, the constituencies were "incompatible with the combined clauses of Article 6 of the Declaration of the Rights of Man and of the Citizen of 1789 and Articles 3 and 24 of the Constitution of France," even though two national censuses took place in 1990 and 1999. However, the successive governments of Lionel Jospin, Jean-Pierre Raffarin, Dominique de Villepin and François Fillon did not alter electoral boundaries, despite the legal requirement of Law No. 86-825 as well as the recommendations of the Constitutional Council of France. Thus, even the French legislative elections of 2007 used conscriptions defined based on the results of the 1982 census and had not incorporated the changes in population occurring in the intervening 25 years. The 2008 election of senators used the same 1982 population numbers, but the impact is not as pronounced in the French Senate (Sénat), as its function is to represent local governments and not the population as a whole.

== 2005 report on redistricting ==
In March 2005, Interior Minister Dominique de Villepin formed a working group in order to assess the legal impact carrying out a redistricting of legislative districts and townships and to define a method that whereby any redistricting would be conducted in compliance with three legal requirements of "neutrality, transparency and fairness." Three months later, State Councillor Pierre Bordry issued his report to Dominique de Villepin - then the prime minister - and the new Interior Minister, Nicolas Sarkozy. However, due to the very sensitive political nature of redistricting, neither de Villepin nor Sarkozy wanted to take the risk of subjecting the changing of constituencies borders to political wrangling ahead of the 2007 legislative elections. In fact, the former president of the Constitutional Council, Pierre Mazeaud, even threatened to void the elections results of the constituencies that would be changed.

The combination of differences between districts and the disparity of representation between departments makes the risk of seeing one minority party or a minority coalition party gather a majority of seats in the National Assembly less theoretical and more of a reality.

— June 2005 report by Pierre Bordry

After the 2002 legislative elections, the Constitutional Council pointed out that since 1986, two national censuses occurred in 1990 and 1999 and disparities in representation were revealed that contradicted the constitutional principle that the National Assembly should be elected on the basis of population proportion. Also, the electoral law of 1986 specified that the population differences between districts should not result that a constituency is more than 20% of the average population of districts of the department. But the report noted that, based on the 1999 national census, 25 districts had a difference of more than 20%. A total of 41 departments (both in the Métropole and overseas) were affected by "major imbalances" between districts.

The electoral law of 1986 specifies that the population differences between districts shall in no case result that a constituency is more than 20% of the average population of districts of the department. But the report noted that, based on the 1999 national census, 25 districts had a difference of more than 20%. The report proposed maintaining the number of constituencies at 577, but this time select a target maximum of 10% deviation in population in relation to the departmental average. According to the method of distribution segments of the population, a parliamentary seat would be awarded for every 116,200 inhabitants instead of for every 108,000 inhabitants, as was the case in the 1986 redistricting. However, the report did not assess the current law that a department cannot have less than two members.

== Creating the commission ==
In 2008, at the behest of President Nicolas Sarkozy, Alain Marleix initiated a plan to redraw French constituencies in order to replace the previous constituency map from 1986. (Marliex was also put in charge of the overall redefinition of boundary delimitation for the elections to the Assemblée Nationale.) In July 2008, the government launched the formal effort to redistrict the constituencies, with Prime Minister François Fillon consulting the representatives of political parties in Parliament, and presented a bill to the Cabinet on September 24.

In accordance with French law, distribution of constituencies should respect the principle of population equality between departments in Metropolitan France, overseas French territories, and French citizens abroad. Thus, the previous proportioning of 108,000 inhabitants per constituency in 1986 consideration was raised to 125,000 inhabitants per constituency. The principle of territorial contiguity of constituencies was retained (except for a few enclaves), as well as the contiguity of cantons and communes. The changing of constituencies was planned by order of the Interior Ministry and was controlled by an ad hoc committee composed of one person appointed by the French President, a one-person appointed by the President of the National Assembly, one person appointed by the President of the Senate, and three judges. All had to first be approved by the Committees of Laws (Commissions des lois) of the National Assembly and Senate.

== Constituency changes ==
=== Added constituencies ===
==== Metropolitan France ====
- Aquitaine et Midi-Pyrénées: 12th of Gironde; 9th and 10th of Haute-Garonne.
- Bretagne et Pays-de-la-Loire: 8th of Ille-et-Vilaine.
- Centre: 6th of Loiret.
- Île-de-France: 10th and 11th of Seine-et-Marne; 10th of Val-d'Oise.
- Provence-Alpes-Côte-d'Azur: 8th of Var; 5th of Vaucluse.
- Languedoc - Roussillon: 6th of Gard; 8th and 9th of Hérault.
- Rhône-Alpes: 5th of Ain; 6th of Haute-Savoie; 10th of Isère; 4th of Savoie.

==== Overseas France ====
- Saint-Barthélemy and Saint-Martin : 1st
- Mayotte : 2nd
- French Polynesia : 3rd
- Réunion : 6th and 7th

==== French citizens resident outside France ====
Constituency	Region	Number of countries included (as recognised by France)
First	Canada and the United States	Two
Second	The Caribbean, Central and South America	Thirty-three
Third	Northern Europe	Ten
Fourth	Benelux	Three
Fifth	Andorra, Monaco, Portugal, and Spain	Four
Sixth	Liechtenstein and Switzerland	Two
Seventh	Central and Eastern Europe	Sixteen (including Kosovo)
Eighth	Israel (and Palestine); Southern Europe and Turkey	Eight
Ninth	North-west Africa	Sixteen
Tenth	Central, Eastern, and Southern Africa; much of the Middle East	Forty-eight
Eleventh	Belarus, Moldova, Russia, and Ukraine; Oceania; most of Asia	Forty-nine

=== Eliminated constituencies ===
==== Nord-Pas-de-Calais ====
- Pas-de-Calais' 13th constituency (areas now merged with Pas-de-Calais' 3rd constituency)
- Pas-de-Calais' 14th constituency (areas now merged with Pas-de-Calais' 11th constituency)
- Nord's 22nd constituency (areas now merged with Nord's 3rd constituency)
- Nord's 23rd constituency
- Nord's 24th constituency (areas now merged with Nord's 12th constituency)

==== Île-de-France ====
- Val-de-Marne's 12th constituency (areas now merged with Val-de-Marne's 7th constituency)
- Seine-Saint-Denis's 13th constituency (areas now merged with Seine-Saint-Denis' 3rd constituency)
- Paris's 19th constituency (areas now in Paris's 17th constituency, with the addition of a small part of the quartier du Combat)
- Paris's 20th constituency (mostly in new Paris's 16th constituency, with some minor boundary changes)
- Paris's 21st constituency (mostly in new Paris's 15th constituency, with parts in new 8th and 6th)

==== Other areas ====
- Allier's 4th constituency (areas now merged with Allier's 3rd constituency)
- Creuse's 2nd constituency (merged with Creuse's 1st constituency, to form one constituency for the department)
- Deux-Sèvres' 4th constituency (areas now merged with Deux-Sèvres' 3rd constituency)
- Haute-Saône's 3rd constituency
- Charente's 4th constituency
- Corrèze's 3rd constituency
- Haut-Rhin's 7th constituency (areas now merged with Haut-Rhin's 4th constituency)
- Hautes-Pyrénées's 3rd constituency (areas now merged with Hautes-Pyrénées' 1st constituency)
- Haute-Vienne's 4th constituency (areas now merged with Haute-Vienne's 1st constituency)
- Indre's 3rd constituency
- Loire's 7th constituency (areas now merged with Loire's 6th constituency)
- Lozère's 2nd constituency
- Manche's 5th constituency (areas now merged with Manche's 4th constituency)
- Marne's 6th constituency (areas now merged with Marne's 3rd constituency)
- Meurthe-et-Moselle's 7th constituency (areas now merged with Meurthe-et-Moselle's 3rd constituency)
- Moselle's 10th constituency (areas now merged with Moselle's 8th constituency)
- Nièvre's 3rd constituency (areas now merged with Nièvre's 2nd constituency)
- Puy-de-Dôme's 6th constituency (areas now merged with Puy-de-Dôme's 2nd constituency)
- Saône-et-Loire's 6th constituency (areas now merged with Saône-et-Loire's 4th constituency)
- Seine-Maritime's 11th constituency (areas now merged with Seine-Maritime's 6th constituency)
- Seine-Maritime's 12th constituency
- Somme's 6th constituency (areas now merged with Somme's 4th constituency)
- Tarn's 4th constituency (areas now merged with Tarn's 1st constituency)

== See also ==
- Electoral redistricting in France
- 1986 redistricting of French legislative constituencies
