= National Assembly (France) =

Lower house of the French Parliament

Coordinates: 48°51′43″N 02°19′07″E

National Assembly Assemblée nationale
- 17th legislature of the Fifth French Republic

Type
- Type: Lower house of the French Parliament

History
- Founded: 4 October 1958; 68 years ago
- Preceded by: National Assembly (French Fourth Republic)

Leadership
- President: Yaël Braun-Pivet, RE since 28 June 2022

Structure
- Seats: 577
- Political groups: Government (second Lecornu government) (162): EPR (92) (Note: Renaissance (87) (Note: RE-TdP (9)); DVD (2); PRV (1); GNC (1); Tapura (1)); LD (36) (Note: MoDem (33); Renaissance (2); RSM (1)); HOR (34) (Note: Horizons (26); LR (2); Renaissance (2); LC (1); DVD (1); AC (1); CCB (1)); Opposition (415): RN (123) (Note: RN (115); LAF (5); IDL (3)); LFI (71) (Note: LFI (67); NPA (1); REV (1); RÉ 974 (1); Péyi-A (1)); SOC (69) (Note: PS (64); PP (2); PPDG (1); EH Bai (1); Ex-Renaissance (1)); DR (49) (Note: LR (44); DVD (5)); E&S (38) (Note: LÉ (25); G.s (6); L'Après (4); GE (1); T44 (1); D! (1)); LIOT (22) (Note: UDI (6); R&PS (3) (Note: FeC (2); PNC (1)); LR (2); PS (2); DVD (2); DVG (2); PRV (1); LC (1); La Convention (1); AD (1); AHIP (1)); GDR (17) (Note: PCF (8); PLR (2); GRS (1); LP (1); Péyi-A (1); Tāvini (1); UC (1); MDES (1); PLD (1)); UDR (17); NI (9) (Note: LR (2); DVD (2); RN (2); Renaissance (1); AC (1); EC (1))
- Length of term: 5 years

Elections
- Voting system: Two-round system
- Last election: 30 June and 7 July 2024
- Next election: By June 2029

Meeting place
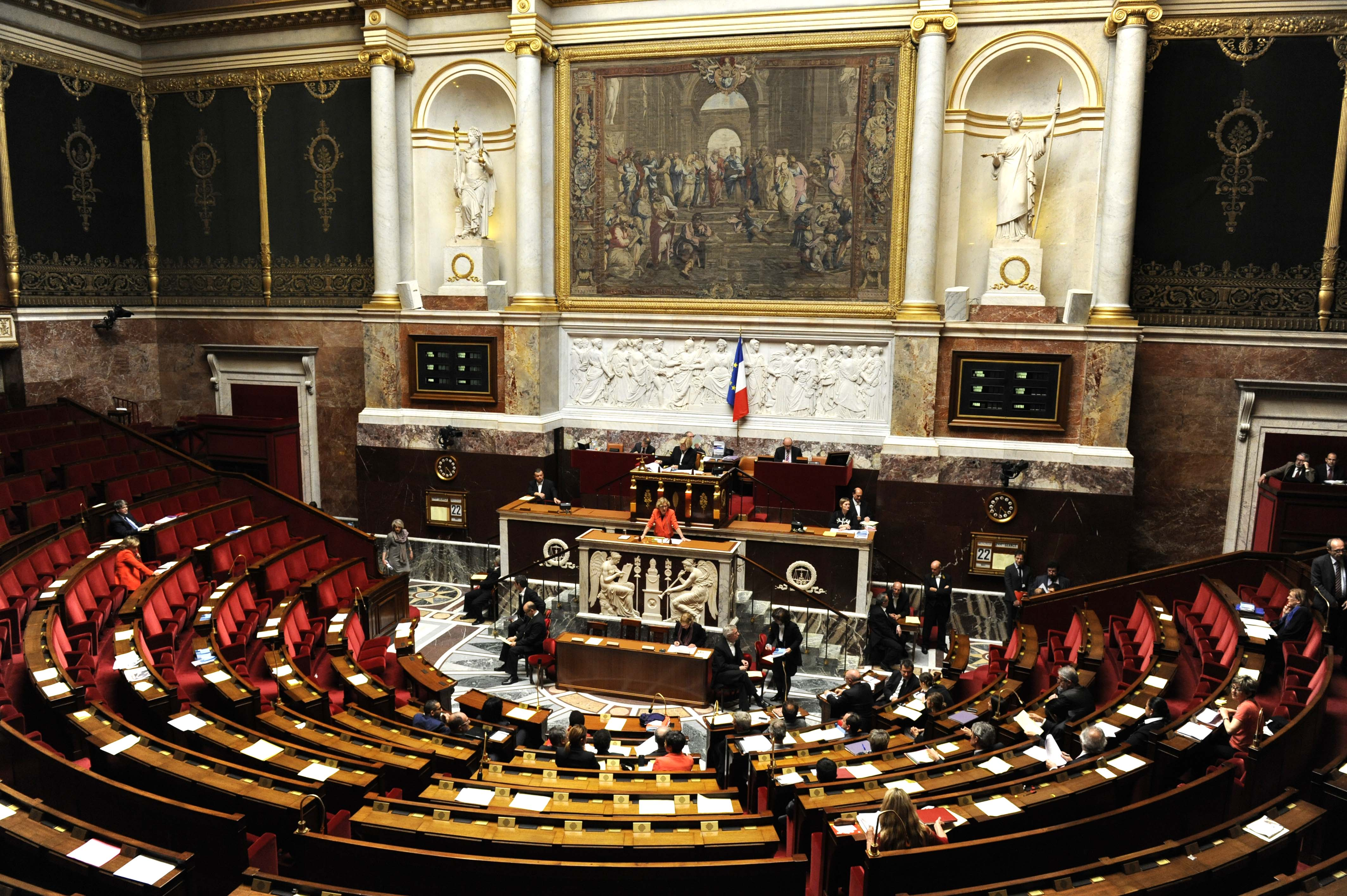
- Palais Bourbon, Paris

Website
- www.assemblee-nationale.fr

Rules
- Règlement de l'Assemblée nationale

The National Assembly (French: Assemblée nationale [asɑ̃ble nɑsjɔnal]) is the lower house of the bicameral French Parliament under the Fifth Republic, the upper house being the Senate (Sénat). The National Assembly's legislators are known as députés ([depyte]) or deputies.

There are 577 députés, each elected by a single-member constituency (at least one per department) through a two-round system; thus, 289 seats are required for a majority. The president of the National Assembly, currently Yaël Braun-Pivet, presides over the body. The officeholder is usually a member of the largest party represented, assisted by vice presidents from across the represented political spectrum. The National Assembly's term is five years; however, the president of France may dissolve the assembly, thereby calling for early elections, unless it has been dissolved in the preceding twelve months. This measure has become rarer since the 2000 French constitutional referendum reduced the presidential term from seven to five years; in the four elections between 2002 and 2017, the president of the Republic had always had a coattail effect delivering a majority in the assembly election two months after the presidential election, and it was accordingly of little benefit to dissolve it. In 2024, it was dissolved following the announcement of the results of the European Parliament election. Due to the separation of powers, the president of the Republic may not take part in parliamentary debates. They can address the Congress of the French Parliament, which meets at the Palace of Versailles, or have the address read by the presidents of both chambers of Parliament, with no subsequent debate.

Following a tradition started by the first National Assembly during the French Revolution, the left-wing parties sit to the left as seen from the president's seat and the right-wing parties to the right; the seating arrangement thus directly indicates the left–right political spectrum as represented in the assembly. The official seat of the National Assembly is the Palais Bourbon on the Rive Gauche of the Seine in the 7th arrondissement of Paris. The Assembly also uses other neighbouring buildings, including the Immeuble Chaban-Delmas on the Rue de l'Université, Paris. Like most institutions of importance in Paris, it is guarded by Republican Guards.

== Relations with the executive ==
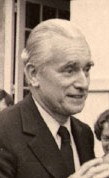
Jacques Chaban-Delmas served three times President of the Assembly between 1958 and 1988.

Following the May 1958 crisis, the Constitution of France in the Fifth Republic greatly increased the power of the executive at the expense of Parliament, compared with the previous constitutions of the Third and Fourth Republics.

The president of the Republic can decide to dissolve the National Assembly and call for new legislative elections. This is meant as a way to resolve stalemates where the Assembly cannot decide on a clear political direction. This possibility is seldom exercised. In 1997, President Jacques Chirac dissolved the National Assembly due to the lack of popularity of Prime Minister Alain Juppé. However, the plan backfired, as the newly elected majority was opposed to Chirac.

The National Assembly can dismiss the executive government (that is, the prime minister and other ministers) by a motion of no confidence (motion de censure). For this reason, prime ministers and their government are necessarily from the dominant party or coalition in the assembly. In the case of a president of the Republic and National Assembly from opposing parties, this leads to the situation known as cohabitation; this situation, which has occurred three times (twice under François Mitterrand, once under Jacques Chirac), is likely to be rarer now that terms of the president and Assembly are the same length (5 years since the 2000 referendum) and are elected in the same year.

While motions de censure are periodically proposed by the opposition following government actions that it deems highly inappropriate, they are purely rhetorical; party discipline ensures that, throughout a parliamentary term, the Government is never dismissed by the Assembly, at least when the governing party/coalition holds a working majority in the Chamber (which was no longer the case following the 2022 election). Since the establishment of the Fifth Republic in 1958, there have been only three successful motion de censure. The first occurred on October 5, 1962, when the National Assembly voted against President Charles de Gaulle's proposal to elect the President by direct universal suffrage. De Gaulle responded by dissolving the National Assembly within days. The second motion of censure was passed on December 4, 2024, with 331 deputies voting against the government of Prime Minister Michel Barnier. The third one was passed against the Bayrou Government on 8 September, 2025. It was voted by 364 deputies in response to Bayrou's use of article 49 of the Constitution of France to bypass the National Assembly on a financial bill.

The Government (the prime minister and the minister in charge of relations with Parliament) used to set the priorities of the agenda for the Assembly's sessions, except for a single day each month. In practice, given the number of priority items, it meant that the schedule of the assembly was almost entirely set by the executive; bills generally only have a chance to be examined if proposed or supported by the executive. This, however, was amended on 23 July 2008. Under the amended Constitution, the Government sets the priorities for two weeks in a month. Another week is designated for the Assembly's "control" prerogatives (consisting mainly of oral questions addressed to the Government). The fourth one is also set by the Assembly. Furthermore, one day per month is set by a "minority" (group supporting the Government but which is not the largest group) or "opposition" group (having officially declared it did not support the Government).

Legislators of the assembly can ask written or oral questions to ministers. The Wednesday afternoon 3 p.m. session of "questions to the government" is broadcast live on television. Like Prime Minister's Questions in the United Kingdom, it is largely a show for the viewers, with members of the majority asking flattering questions, while the opposition tries to embarrass the government.

== Elections ==
Since 1988, the 577 deputies are elected by direct universal suffrage with a two-round system by constituency, for a five-year mandate, subject to dissolution. The constituencies each have about 100,000 inhabitants. The electoral law of 1986 specifies their variance of population within a department should not exceed 20%, when conducting any redistribution. However, none were redrawn between 1982 and 2009. As a result of population movements, births and deaths inequalities between the less populous rural districts and the urban districts arose. The deputy for the most populous (within Val-d'Oise), represented 188,000 voters, while that for the other extreme (for Lozère at-large), represented 34,000. That for Saint Pierre and Miquelon serves fewer than 6,000. Most were redrawn in 2009 (boundaries officially adopted in 2010, effective in 2012), but this redistribution was controversial, such as the creation of eleven constituencies for French residents overseas without increasing the number of seats. The electoral map is drawn by an independent commission.

To be elected in the first round of voting, a candidate must obtain at least 50% of the votes cast, with a turnout of at least 25% of the registered voters on the electoral rolls. If no candidate is elected in the first round, those who account for in excess of 12.5% (1/8) of the registered voters are entered in the second round of voting. If no three or more meet such conditions, the two highest-placing candidates automatically advance to the second round of voting – at which, the candidate who receives the most votes is elected. Each candidate is enrolled along with a substitute, who takes the candidate's place if during tenure incapacitated or barred – if the deputy becomes a government member, most notably.

The organic law of 10 July 1985 established a system of party-list proportional representation within the framework of the département. It was necessary within this framework to obtain at least 5% of the vote to elect an official. However, the legislative election of 1986, carried out under this system, gave France a new majority which returned the National Assembly to the aforementioned two-round system.

Of the 577 elected deputies, 539 represent metropolitan France, 27 represent the overseas departments and overseas collectivities; 11 represent French residents overseas.

== Procedure ==
The agenda of the National Assembly is mostly decided by the Government, although the Assembly can also enforce its own agenda. Indeed, article 48 of the Constitution guarantees at least a monthly session decided by the Assembly.

=== Law proposal ===
A law proposal is a document divided into three distinct parts: a title, an exposé des motifs and a dispositif. The exposé des motifs is similar to a preamble and describes the objectives of the legislation The dispositif is the legislation as such, containing articles which contain the bill's content.

A proposal for a law can originate from the Government (projet de loi) or a member of Parliament (proposition de loi). Certain laws must come from the Government, including financial regulations. The law proposals may pass through the National Assembly and Senate in an indifferent order, except for financial laws which must go through the Assembly first, or territorial organisational laws or laws for French citizens living in foreign countries, which must first pass through the Senate.

=== Deposit of a law ===
For an ordinary proposition of law, texts must be first reviewed by a permanent parliamentary commission, or a special commission designated for this purpose. During the discussion in the commission, or in plenary sessions in the assembly, the Government and Parliament can add, modify or delete articles of the proposal. The text is thus amended. Amendments proposed by a parliamentarian cannot mobilise further public funding. The Government has the right to ask the Assembly to pronounce itself in one vote only with the amendments proposed or accepted by the Government itself.

Projects of propositions of laws will be examined succinctly by the two chambers of Parliament (National Assembly and Senate) until the text is identical. After two lectures by the two chambers (or just one if the Government chooses to engage an acceleration of the text adoption, which can happen only in certain conditions) and without any accord, the Prime Minister or the two presidents of the chambers, conjointly with first, can convoke a special commission composed by an equal number of members of Assembly and Senators to reach a compromise and propose a new text. The new proposition has to be approved by the Government before being re-proposed to the two chambers. No new amendments can be added except on the Government's approval. If the new proposal of law fails to be approved by the two chambers, the Government can, after a new lecture by the National Assembly and the Senate, ask the National Assembly to rule a final judgement. In that case, the National Assembly can either take back the text elaborated by the special commission or the last one that they voted for – possibly modified by several amendments by the Senate.

The president of the Republic, on the Government or the two chambers' proposal, can submit every law proposal as a referendum if it concerns the organisation of public powers, reforms on the economy, social and environmental measures, or every proposition that would have an impact on the functioning of the institutions. A referendum on the previous conditions can also be initiated by a fifth of the membership of Parliament, supported by a tenth of the voters inscribed on the electoral lists. Finally, the laws are promulgated by the president of the Republic's signature. The officeholder may call for a new legislative deliberation of the law or one of its articles in front of the National Assembly, which cannot be denied.

== Conditions and benefits of deputies ==
=== Remuneration ===
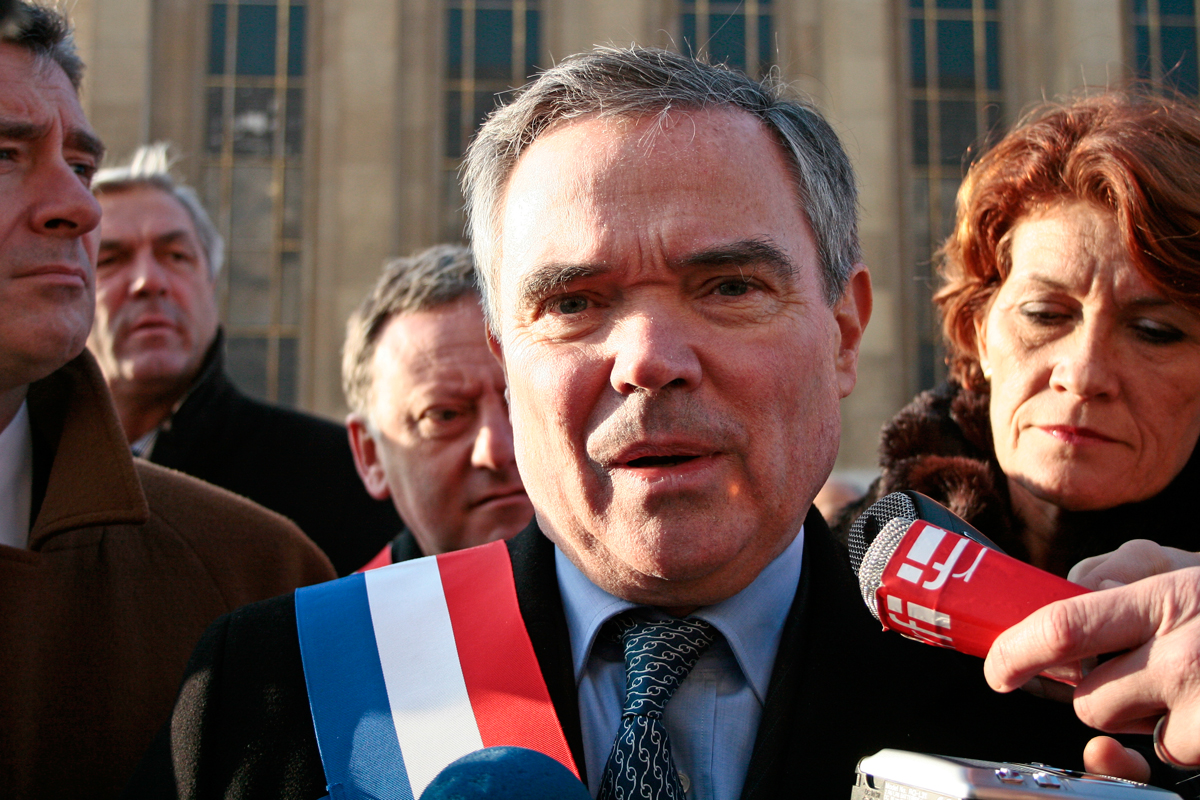
Deputies wear tricolor sashes on official occasions outside the Assembly or on public marches, like other elected officials in France; former President of the National Assembly Bernard Accoyer is pictured here.

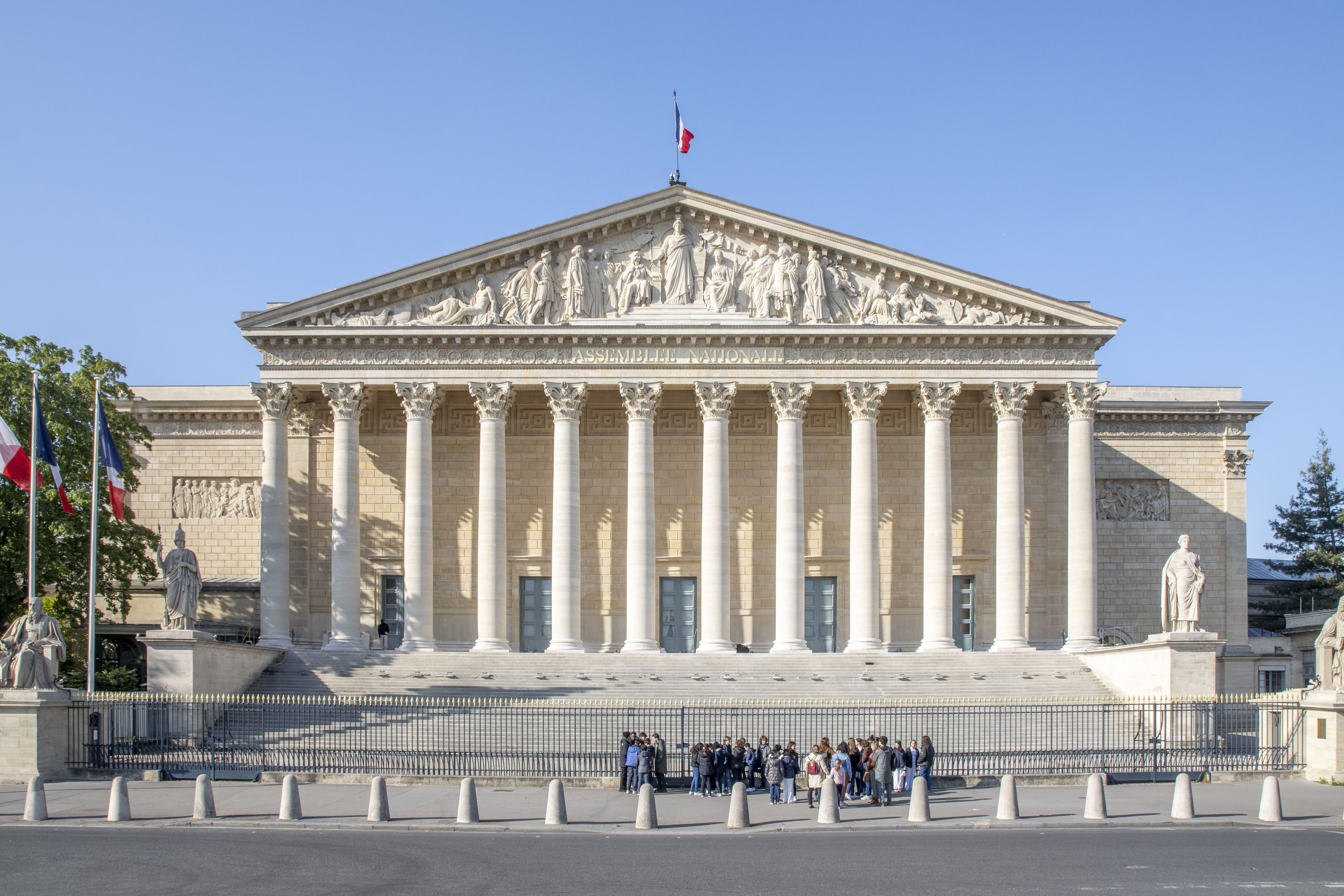
The Palais Bourbon in Paris, where the National Assembly meets

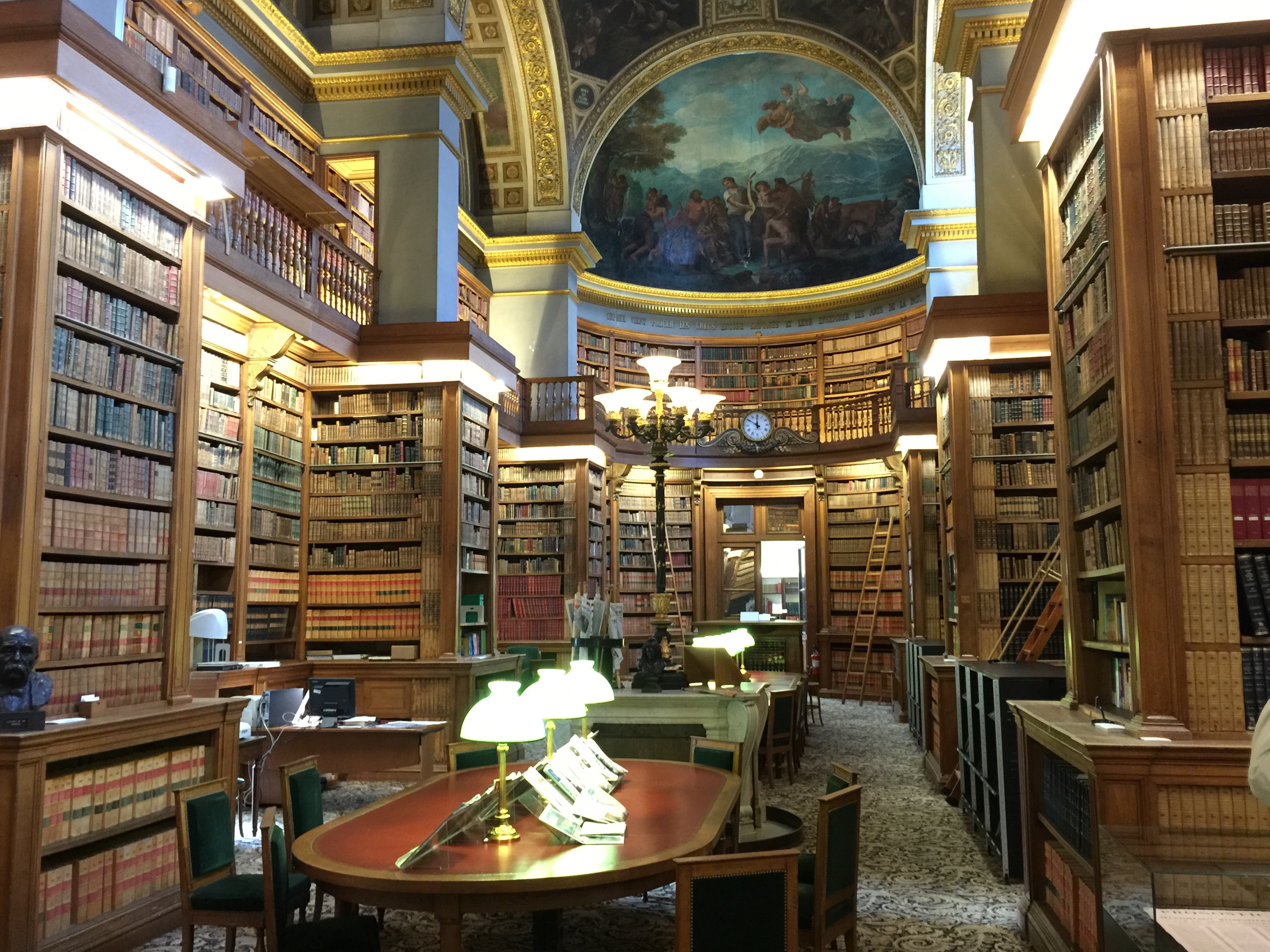
Ceiling paintings in the Library of the Assemblée nationale in the Palais Bourbon, on a series of cupolas and pendentives, are by Eugène Delacroix.

Assembly legislators receive a salary of €7,043.69 per month. There is also the "compensation representing official expenses" (indemnité représentative de frais de mandat, IRFM) of €5,867.39 per month to pay costs related to the office, as well as a total of €8,949 per month to pay up to five employees. They also have an office in the assembly, various perquisites in terms of transport and communications, social security, a pension fund and unemployment insurance. Under article 26 of the Constitution, deputies, like Senators, are protected by parliamentary immunity. In the case of an accumulation of mandates, a deputy cannot receive a wage of more than €9,779.11. Deputies' expenses can be scrutinised by a commission; sanctions can be pronounced if expenses were undue.

=== Accumulation of mandates and minimum age ===
The position of deputy of the National Assembly is incompatible with that of any other elected legislative position (Senator or since 2000, Member of European Parliament) or with some administrative functions (members of the Constitutional Council and senior officials such as prefects, magistrates, or officers who are ineligible for department where they are stationed).

Deputies may not have more than one local mandate (in a municipal, intercommunal, general, or regional council) in addition to their incumbent mandate. Since the 2017 legislative election, deputies cannot hold an executive position in any local government (municipality, department, region). However, they can hold a part-time councillor mandate. In July 2017, 58% of deputies held such a seat. Since 1958, the mandate is also incompatible with a ministerial function. Upon appointment to the Government, the elected deputy has one month to choose between the mandate and the office. If they choose the second option, then they are replaced by their substitute. Since a change validated by the National Assembly in 2008, deputies can return to their seat in the assembly one month after the end of their cabinet position. Previously, a special election had to be held.

To be eligible to be elected to the National Assembly, one must be at least 18 years old, of French citizenship, as well as not subject to a sentence of deprivation of civil rights or to personal bankruptcy.

Eligibility conditions

1. Eligibility due to personal requirements

The essential conditions to run for elections are the following. First, a candidate must have French citizenship. Secondly, the minimum age required to run for a seat at the National Assembly is set at 18 years old. The candidate must also have fulfilled his National Civic Day, a special day created to replace the military service. Finally, a candidate under guardianship and curatorship cannot be elected to the assembly.

Furthermore, a person cannot be elected if they were declared ineligible following fraudulent funding of a previous electoral campaign. Indeed, the voter could be considered as highly influenced and their decision making could be impacted. The sincerity of the results could thus not be regarded as viable and legitimate.

2. Eligibility due to positions that a person may occupy

The deputy mandate cannot be cumulated with a mandate of Senator, MEP, member of the Government or of the Constitutional Council.

The deputy mandate is also incompatible with being a member of the military corps on duty, as well as with the exercise of one of the following mandates: regional council executive, Corsican Assembly executive, departmental council executive or municipal council executive in a municipality of a least or more than 3,500 inhabitants. Prefects are also unable to be elected in France in every district they are exercising power or exercised power for less than three years before the date of the election.

Since 31 March 2017, being elected deputy is incompatible with most executive local mandates such as mayors, president of a regional council or member of the departmental council.

== Historical composition ==
Election	Metropolitan France	Overseas France			Total seats	Changes
Election	Metropolitan France	Overseas departments (DOM)	Overseas territories (TOM)	Territorial collectivities	Total seats	Changes
1958	465	10 (Note: 3 seats for Martinique, 3 for Guadeloupe, 3 for Réunion and 1 for French Guiana) + 71 (Note: 67 seats for French Algeria and 4 seats for French departments of Sahara.)	33 (Note: They were not elected in 1958 and remained provisionally in office to represent the territories of French Community: Mauritania (1), Senegal (2), Sudan (4), Ivory Coast (1), Upper Volta (4), Dahomey (2) and Niger (2), previously included in French West Africa; Chad (2), Ubangi-Shari (1), Ubangi-Shari-Chad (1), Gabon (1), French Congo (1), Gabon-French Congo (1), previously included in French Equatorial Africa; Madagascar (5); Comoros, French Somali Coast, French Polynesia, Saint Pierre and Miquelon and New Caledonia (with one seat each). In 1959, these last five entities decided to assume the status of Overseas territory (TOM) and new elections were held (in particular, 1959 Comoros by-election and 1959 French Somaliland by-election), while the other territories became independent and lost their representation. An additional seat was attributed to Comoros (multi-member constituency).)	−	579	−
1962	465	10	7	−	482	French Algeria became independent.; A new constituency was created for Wallis and Futuna (TOM) in 1961.
1967	470	10	7	−	487	5 new constituencies were created in 1966.
1968	470	10	7	−	487	−
1973	473	10	7	−	490	3 new constituencies were created in 1972.
1978	474	11	5	1	491	An additional constituency was created in Corsica in 1975.; In 1976, Comoros gained their independence except Mayotte, which became a Territorial collectivity (one constituency), and Saint Pierre and Miquelon (formerly TOM) became a DOM.; In 1977, French Territory of the Afars and the Issas (formerly known as French Somali Coast) became independent; moreover, a new constituency was created in Polynesia (TOM) and another in New Caledonia (TOM).
1981	474	11	5	1	491	−
1986	555 (95 departments)	15 (5 DOM)	5 (3 TOM)	2 (2 Territorial collectivities)	577	In 1985, Saint Pierre and Miquelon (formerly DOM) became a Territorial collectivity.; In 1986, party-list proportional representation system was introduced and the majoritarian two-ballot system remained only in 3 single-member constituencies: Wallis et Futuna (TOM), Mayotte and Saint Pierre and Miquelon (Territorial collectivities).
1988	555	15	5	2	577	In 1988, the majoritarian two-ballot system was re-established. In comparison to 1981 elections, 96 new constituencies were created (91 in the Metropolitan France, 5 in the Overseas departments), while 10 Parisian constituencies (n. 22 to n. 31) were suppressed.

=== French Revolution (1789–1799) ===
In 1795, 1797 & 1798, only part of the legislature was elected.

Extreme Left / Montagnards / Jacobin / The Plain / Girondins / Thermidorians / Independent / Feuillant / Clichy Club / Ultra Royalists
1791	136 / 345 / 264
1792	200 / 389 / 160
1795	63 / 54 / 33
1797	28 / 44 / 105
1798	106 / 44
1799	30 / 240 / 150 / 80

=== Restoration (1815–1848) ===
Under the Bourbon Restoration and July Monarchy, the term National Assembly was not in use for any French government organ. The lower house of the French legislature at the time was called the Chamber of Deputies.

=== Second Republic (1848–1852) ===
The Mountain / Republicans / Party of Order
1848	80 / 600 / 200
1849	180 / 75 / 450

=== Second Empire (1852–1870) ===
Under the Second French Empire, the term National Assembly was not in use for any French government organ. The lower house of the French legislature at the time was called the Corps législatif.

=== Third Republic (1870–1940) ===
Republican Union / Centre-Left / Republican Left / Bonapartists / Orléanists / Legitimists
1871	38 / 112 / 72 / 20 / 214 / 182

Initially, the National Assembly of the French Third Republic was a unicameral constituent assembly. Following the enactment of the French Constitutional Laws of 1875, the term National Assembly was used to refer to a joint sitting of both Houses of the now-bicameral French legislature. The lower house of the French legislature at the time was called the Chamber of Deputies, while the upper house was called the Senate.

After the Fall of France (1940), the new Vichy regime forced the Assembly to approve the French Constitutional Law of 1940, which made the Assembly effectively powerless. Free France established a Provisional Consultative Assembly in 1943 based in Algiers representing the resistance movements, political parties, and territories that were engaged against the Axis.

=== Fourth Republic (1946–1958) ===
PCF / SFIO / PRRRS / PR / Miscellaneous / RGR / MRP / CNIP / PRL / RPF / CNRS / UNR / UFF
1945	159 / 146 / 60 / 6 / 151 / 64
June 1946	151 / 127 / 31 / 9 / 166 / 61
November 1946	182 / 102 / 69 / 29 / 173 / 72
1951	103 / 107 / 90 / 95 / 96 / 121 / 13
1956	150 / 95 / 77 / 14 / 7 / 83 / 95 / 22 / 52

=== Fifth Republic (since 1958) ===
PCF / LFI / PSU / G.s / FGDS / The Greens / EELV / PE / SFIO / PS / PRG / TDP / PRRRS / RP / Miscellaneous / Vacant / REN / CD / UDF / MoDem / Horizons / LC / UDI / UDR / RPR / RI / UMP / LR / UDX / RN
1958	10 / 40 / 37 / 1 / 57 / 132 / 189
1962	41 / 2 / 65 / 44 / 6 / 36 / 233 / 28 / 27
1967	73 / 4 / 117 / 9 / 41 / 243
1968	34 / 57 / 9 / 33 / 354
1973	73 / 1 / 102 / 12 / 30 / 272
1978	86 / 104 / 10 / 17 / 121 / 150
1981	44 / 283 / 17 / 62 / 85
1986	35 / 206 / 2 / 23 / 127 / 149 / 35
1988	27 / 260 / 9 / 23 / 2 / 129 / 126 / 1
1993	24 / 53 / 50 / 207 / 242 / 1
1997	35 / 7 / 255 / 12 / 16 / 112 / 139 / 1
2002	21 / 3 / 140 / 7 / 20 / 29 / 357
2007	15 / 4 / 186 / 7 / 27 / 3 / 22 / 313
2012	7 / 17 / 280 / 12 / 6 / 45 / 2 / 12 / 194 / 2
2017	10 / 17 / 1 / 30 / 3 / 28 / 308 / 42 / 18 / 112 / 8
2022	12 / 72 / 4 / 21 / 26 / 1 / 3 / 60 / 150 / 48 / 27 / 3 / 61 / 89
2024	9 / 74 / 6 / 28 / 59 / 2 / 51 / 102 / 33 / 26 / 5 / 39 / 17 / 126

== 17th legislature ==
=== Parliamentary groups ===
Composition of the National Assembly as of 22 September 2026
Parliamentary group		Members	Related	Total	President
RN	National Rally	119	3	122	Marine Le Pen
EPR	Together for the Republic	77	13	90	Gabriel Attal
LFI-NFP	La France Insoumise-New Popular Front	69	2	71	Mathilde Panot
SOC	Socialists and Affiliated	59	8	67	Boris Vallaud
DR	Republican Right group	41	7	48	Laurent Wauquiez
ECO	Social and Ecologist Group	38	0	38	Cyrielle Chatelain
DEM	The Democrats	35	2	37	Marc Fesneau
HOR	Horizons and Affiliated	30	6	36	Laurent Marcangeli
LIOT	Liberties, Independents, Overseas and Territories	22	0	22	Christophe Naegelen
GDR	Democratic and Republican Left	17	0	17	Stéphane Peu
UDR	UDR group	17	0	17	Éric Ciotti
NI	Non-Attached Members	–	–	12	–

=== Bureau of the National Assembly ===
Composition of the Bureau as of 1 October 2025
Post (in charge of)	Name	Constituency	Group
The National Assembly President	Yaël Braun-Pivet	Yvelines's 5th constituency	EPR
1st Vice President (international relations)	Nadège Abomangoli	Seine-Saint-Denis's 4th	LFI-NFP
2nd Vice President (transparency and representatives of interest groups)	Clémence Guetté	Val-de-Marne's 1st	LFI-NFP
3rd Vice President (communication and the press)	Christophe Blanchet	Calvados's 4th constituency	DEM
4th Vice President (application of the deputy's statute)	Marie-Agnès Poussier-Winsback	Seine-Maritime's 9th constituency	HOR
5th Vice President (study groups)	Sébastien Chenu	Nord's 19th constituency	RN
6th Vice President (artistic and cultural heritage of the National Assembly)	Hélène Laporte	Lot-et-Garonne's 2nd constituency	RN
Quaestor	Christine Pirès-Beaune	Puy-de-Dôme 9th	SOC
Quaestor	Brigitte Klinkert	Haut-Rhin's 1st	EPR
Quaestor	Michèle Tabarot	Alpes-Maritimes's 9th	DR
Secretary	Gabriel Amard	Rhône's 6th	LFI-NFP
Secretary	Farida Amrani	Essone's 1st	LFI-NFP
Secretary	Inaki Echaniz	Pyrénées-Atlantiques's 4th	SOC
Secretary	Lise Magnier	Marne's 4th	HOR
Secretary	Christophe Naegelen	Vosges's 3rd	LIOT
Secretary	Laurent Panifous	Ariège's 2nd	LIOT
Secretary	Sophie Pantel	Lozère's 1st	SOC
Secretary	Stéphane Peu	Seine-Saint-Denis's 2nd	GDR
Secretary	Sébastien Peytavie	Dordogne's 4th	ECO
Secretary	Mereana Reid Arbelot	French Polynesia's 3rd	GDR
Secretary	Éva Sas	Paris's 8th	ECO
Secretary	Sabrina Sebaihi	Hauts-de-Seine's 4th	ECO

=== Presidencies of standing committees ===
Presidencies of standing committees as of 2 October 2025
Standing committees	President	Group
Cultural and Education Affairs Committee	Alexandre Portier	DR
Economic Affairs Committee	Stéphane Travert	EPR
Social Affairs Committee	Frédéric Valletoux	HOR
Sustainable Development, Spatial and Regional Planning Committee	Sandrine Le Feur	EPR
National Defence and Armed Forces Committee	Jean-Michel Jacques	EPR
Foreign Affairs Committee	Bruno Fuchs	LD
Finance, General Economy and Budgetary Monitoring Committee	Éric Coquerel	LFI-NFP
Constitutional Acts, Legislation and General Administration Committee	Florent Boudié	EPR

== See also ==
- Chamber of Deputies (France)
- Politics of France
- Women in the French National Assembly
- Lists of deputies of the National Assembly of France
