= List of deputies of the 12th National Assembly of France =

List in alphabetical order of the deputies of the 12th French National Assembly (2002–2007).

== A ==
- Mr. Jean-Pierre Abelin, UDF, Vienne
- Mr. Jean-Claude Abrioux, UMP, Seine-Saint-Denis
- Mr. Bernard Accoyer, UMP, Haute-Savoie
- Ms. Patricia Adam, socialist, Finistère
- Mr. Manuel Aeschlimann, UMP, Hauts-de-Seine
- Mr. Damien Alary, socialist, Gard
- Mr. Pierre Albertini, associated with UDF, Seine-Maritime
- Mr. Alfred Almont, UMP, Martinique
- Mr. Jean-Paul Anciaux, UMP, Saône-et-Loire
- Mr. René André, UMP, Manche
- Ms. Sylvie Andrieux-Bacquet, socialist, Bouches-du-Rhône
- Mr. Gilles Artigues, UDF, Loire
- Mr. François Asensi, communist, Seine-Saint-Denis
- Mr. Philippe Auberger, UMP, Yonne
- Mr. François d'Aubert, UMP, Mayenne
- Mr. Jean-Marie Aubron, socialist, Moselle
- Mr. Jean Auclair, UMP, Creuse
- Mr. Bertho Audifax, UMP, Réunion
- Ms. Martine Aurillac, UMP, Paris
- Mr. Jean-Marc Ayrault, socialist, Loire-Atlantique

== B ==
- Mr. Jean-Paul Bacquet, socialist, Puy-de-Dôme
- Mr. Pierre-Christophe Baguet, UDF, Hauts-de-Seine
- Mr. Patrick Balkany, independent, Hauts-de-Seine
- Mr. Édouard Balladur, UMP, Paris
- Mr. Jean-Pierre Balligand, socialist, Aisne
- Mr. Gérard Bapt, socialist, Haute-Garonne
- Mr. Jean Bardet, UMP, Val-d'Oise
- Ms. Brigitte Barèges, UMP, Tarn-et-Garonne
- Mr. François Baroin, UMP, Aube
- Mr. Jacques Barrot, UMP, Haute-Loire
- Mr. Claude Bartolone, socialist, Seine-Saint-Denis
- Mr. Jacques Bascou, socialist, Aude
- Ms. Sylvia Bassot, UMP, Orne
- Mr. Christian Bataille, socialist, Nord
- Mr. Jean-Claude Bateux, socialist, Seine-Maritime
- Mr. François Bayrou, UDF, Pyrénées-Atlantiques
- Mr. Jean-Claude Beauchaud, socialist, Charente
- Mr. Patrick Beaudouin, UMP, Val-de-Marne
- Mr. Joël Beaugendre, UMP, Guadeloupe
- Mr. Jean-Claude Beaulieu, UMP, Charente-Maritime
- Ms. Huguette Bello, independent, Réunion
- Mr. Jacques-Alain Bénisti, UMP, Val-de-Marne
- Mr. Jean-Louis Bernard, UMP, Loiret
- Mr. Marc Bernier, UMP, Mayenne
- Mr. André Berthol, UMP, Moselle
- Mr. Jean-Michel Bertrand, UMP, Ain
- Mr. Xavier Bertrand, UMP, Aisne
- Mr. Jean-Yves Besselat, UMP, Seine-Maritime
- Mr. Éric Besson, socialist, Drôme
- Mr. Jean Besson, UMP, Rhône
- Mr. Gabriel Biancheri, UMP, Drôme
- Mr. Jean-Louis Bianco, socialist, Alpes-de-Haute-Provence
- Mr. Gilbert Biessy, communist, Isère
- Mr. Jérôme Bignon, UMP, Somme
- Ms. Martine Billard, independent, Paris
- Mr. Jean-Marie Binetruy, UMP, Doubs
- Mr. Claude Birraux, UMP, Haute-Savoie
- Mr. Christian Blanc, associated with UDF, Yvelines
- Mr. Étienne Blanc, UMP, Ain
- Mr. Jean-Pierre Blazy, socialist, Val-d'Oise
- Mr. Émile Blessig, UMP, Bas-Rhin
- Mr. Serge Blisko, socialist, Paris
- Mr. Patrick Bloche, socialist, Paris
- Mr. Roland Blum, UMP, Bouches-du-Rhône
- Mr. Jacques Bobe, UMP, Charente
- Mr. Alain Bocquet, communist, Nord
- Mr. Jean-Claude Bois, socialist, Pas-de-Calais
- Mr. Yves Boisseau, UMP, Calvados
- Mr. Daniel Boisserie, socialist, Haute-Vienne
- Mr. Marcel Bonnot, UMP, Doubs
- Mr. Maxime Bono, socialist, Charente-Maritime
- Mr. Augustin Bonrepaux, socialist, Ariège
- Mr. Bernard Bosson, UDF, Haute-Savoie
- Mr. Jean-Michel Boucheron, socialist, Ille-et-Vilaine
- Mr. René Bouin, UMP, Maine-et-Loire
- Mr. Roger Boullonnois, UMP, Seine-et-Marne
- Mr. Gilles Bourdouleix, UMP, Maine-et-Loire
- Mr. Bruno Bourg-Broc, UMP, Marne
- Mr. Pierre Bourguignon, socialist, Seine-Maritime
- Ms. Chantal Bourragué, UMP, Gironde
- Ms. Danielle Bousquet, socialist, Côtes-d'Armor
- Ms. Christine Boutin, UMP, Yvelines
- Mr. Loïc Bouvard, UMP, Morbihan
- Mr. Michel Bouvard, UMP, Savoie
- Mr. Patrick Braouezec, communist, Seine-Saint-Denis
- Mr. Ghislain Bray, UMP, Seine-et-Marne
- Mr. Philippe Briand, UMP, Indre-et-Loire
- Mr. Jacques Briat, UMP, Tarn-et-Garonne
- Ms. Maryvonne Briot, UMP, Haute-Saône
- Mr. Bernard Brochand, UMP, Alpes-Maritimes
- Mr. François Brottes, socialist, Isère
- Ms. Chantal Brunel, UMP, Seine-et-Marne
- Mr. Jacques Brunhes, communist, Hauts-de-Seine
- Ms. Marie-George Buffet, communist, Seine-Saint-Denis
- Mr. Michel Buillard, UMP, French Polynesia
- Mr. Yves Bur, UMP, Bas-Rhin

== C ==
- Mr. Christian Cabal, UMP, Loire
- Mr. Marcel Cabiddu, socialist, Pas-de-Calais
- Mr. Dominique Caillaud, UMP, Vendée
- Mr. François Calvet, UMP, Pyrénées-Orientales
- Mr. Jean-Christophe Cambadélis, socialist, Paris
- Mr. Bernard Carayon, UMP, Tarn
- Mr. Thierry Carcenac, socialist, Tarn
- Mr. Pierre Cardo, UMP, Yvelines
- Mr. Christophe Caresche, socialist, Paris
- Mr. Antoine Carré, UMP, Loiret
- Mr. Gilles Carrez, UMP, Val-de-Marne
- Ms. Martine Carrillon-Couvreur, socialist, Nièvre
- Mr. Laurent Cathala, socialist, Val-de-Marne
- Mr. Richard Cazenave, UMP, Isère
- Ms. Joëlle Ceccaldi-Raynaud, UMP, Hauts-de-Seine
- Mr. Yves Censi, UMP, Aveyron
- Mr. Jean-Yves Chamard, UMP, Vienne
- Mr. Jean-Paul Chanteguet, socialist, Indre
- Mr. Gérard Charasse, independent, Allier
- Mr. Hervé de Charette, UMP, Maine-et-Loire
- Mr. Jean-Paul Charié, UMP, Loiret
- Mr. Jean Charroppin, UMP, Jura
- Mr. Jérôme Chartier, UMP, Val-d'Oise
- Mr. Michel Charzat, socialist, Paris
- Mr. André Chassaigne, communist, Puy-de-Dôme
- Mr. Roland Chassain, UMP, Bouches-du-Rhône
- Mr. Luc-Marie Chatel, UMP, Haute-Marne
- Mr. Jean-Marc Chavanne, UMP, Haute-Savoie
- Mr. Gérard Cherpion, UMP, Vosges
- Mr. Jean-François Chossy, UMP, Loire
- Mr. Jean-Louis Christ, UMP, Haut-Rhin
- Mr. Dino Cinieri, UMP, Loire
- Mr. Alain Claeys, socialist, Vienne
- Mr. Pascal Clément, UMP, Loire
- Ms. Marie-Françoise Clergeau, socialist, Loire-Atlantique
- Mr. Philippe Cochet, UMP, Rhône
- Mr. Yves Cochet, independent, Paris
- Mr. Gilles Cocquempot, socialist, Pas-de-Calais
- Mr. Pierre Cohen, socialist, Haute-Garonne
- Mr. Georges Colombier, UMP, Isère
- Ms. Geneviève Colot, UMP, Essonne
- Ms. Anne-Marie Comparini, UDF, Rhône
- Mr. François Cornut-Gentille, UMP, Haute-Marne
- Mr. Louis Cosyns, UMP, Cher
- Mr. René Couanau, UMP, Ille-et-Vilaine
- Mr. Charles de Courson, UDF, Marne
- Mr. Édouard Courtial, UMP, Oise
- Mr. Alain Cousin, UMP, Manche
- Mr. Jean-Yves Cousin, UMP, Calvados
- Mr. Yves Coussain, UMP, Cantal
- Mr. Jean-Michel Couve, UMP, Var
- Mr. Charles Cova, UMP, Seine-et-Marne
- Mr. Paul-Henri Cugnenc, UMP, Hérault
- Mr. Henri Cuq, UMP, Yvelines

== D ==
- Ms. Claude Darciaux, socialist, Côte-d'Or
- Mr. Olivier Dassault, UMP, Oise
- Mr. Michel Dasseux, socialist, Dordogne
- Mr. Marc-Philippe Daubresse, UMP, Nord
- Ms. Martine David, socialist, Rhône
- Mr. Jean-Louis Debré, UMP, Eure
- Mr. Jean-Claude Decagny, UMP, Nord
- Mr. Christian Decocq, UMP, Nord
- Mr. Jean-Pierre Decool, associated with UMP, Nord
- Mr. Bernard Deflesselles, UMP, Bouches-du-Rhône
- Mr. Jean-Pierre Defontaine, associated with socialist, Pas-de-Calais
- Mr. Lucien Degauchy, UMP, Oise
- Mr. Marcel Dehoux, socialist, Nord
- Mr. Francis Delattre, UMP, Val-d'Oise
- Mr. Michel Delebarre, socialist, Nord
- Mr. Richard Dell'Agnola, UMP, Val-de-Marne
- Mr. Patrick Delnatte, UMP, Nord
- Mr. Jean Delobel, socialist, Nord
- Mr. Jean-Marie Demange, UMP, Moselle
- Mr. Stéphane Demilly, UDF, Somme
- Mr. Yves Deniaud, UMP, Orne
- Mr. Bernard Depierre, UMP, Côte-d'Or
- Mr. Léonce Deprez, UMP, Pas-de-Calais
- Mr. Bernard Derosier, socialist, Nord
- Ms. Marie-Hélène des Esgaulx, UMP, Gironde
- Mr. Jacques Desallangre, communist, Aisne
- Mr. Jean-Jacques Descamps, UMP, Indre-et-Loire
- Mr. Michel Destot, socialist, Isère
- Mr. Éric Diard, UMP, Bouches-du-Rhône
- Mr. Jean Diébold, UMP, Haute-Garonne
- Mr. Michel Diefenbacher, UMP, Lot-et-Garonne
- Mr. Jean Dionis du Séjour, UDF, Lot-et-Garonne
- Mr. Marc Dolez, socialist, Nord
- Mr. Jacques Domergue, UMP, Hérault
- Mr. Renaud Donnedieu de Vabres, UMP, Indre-et-Loire
- Mr. Jean-Pierre Door, UMP, Loiret
- Mr. Dominique Dord, UMP, Savoie
- Mr. François Dosé, socialist, Meuse
- Mr. René Dosière, socialist, Aisne
- Mr. Philippe Douste-Blazy, UMP, Haute-Garonne
- Mr. Julien Dray, socialist, Essonne
- Mr. Tony Dreyfus, socialist, Paris
- Mr. Guy Drut, UMP, Seine-et-Marne
- Mr. Jean-Michel Dubernard, UMP, Rhône
- Mr. Philippe Dubourg, UMP, Gironde
- Mr. Gérard Dubrac, UMP, Gers
- Mr. Pierre Ducout, socialist, Gironde
- Mr. Jean-Pierre Dufau, socialist, Landes
- Mr. Jean-Louis Dumont, socialist, Meuse
- Mr. Jean-Pierre Dupont, UMP, Corrèze
- Mr. Nicolas Dupont-Aignan, UMP, Essonne
- Mr. Jean-Paul Dupré, socialist, Aude
- Mr. Yves Durand, socialist, Nord
- Mr. Frédéric Dutoit, communist, Bouches-du-Rhône

== E ==
- Mr. Henri Emmanuelli, socialist, Landes
- Mr. Christian Estrosi, UMP, Alpes-Maritimes
- Mr. Claude Evin, socialist, Loire-Atlantique

== F ==
- Mr. Laurent Fabius, socialist, Seine-Maritime
- Mr. Albert Facon, socialist, Pas-de-Calais
- Mr. Pierre-Louis Fagniez, UMP, Val-de-Marne
- Mr. Francis Falala, UMP, Marne
- Mr. Yannick Favennec, UMP, Mayenne
- Mr. Georges Fenech, UMP, Rhône
- Mr. Jean-Michel Ferrand, UMP, Vaucluse
- Mr. Alain Ferry, associated with UMP, Bas-Rhin
- Mr. Daniel Fidelin, UMP, Seine-Maritime
- Mr. André Flajolet, UMP, Pas-de-Calais
- Mr. Jacques Floch, socialist, Loire-Atlantique
- Mr. Jean-Claude Flory, UMP, Ardèche
- Mr. Philippe Folliot, associated with UDF, Tarn
- Mr. Pierre Forgues, socialist, Hautes-Pyrénées
- Mr. Nicolas Forissier, UMP, Indre
- Mr. Jean-Michel Fourgous, UMP, Yvelines
- Mr. Michel Françaix, socialist, Oise
- Ms. Arlette Franco, UMP, Pyrénées-Orientales
- Ms. Jacqueline Fraysse, communist, Hauts-de-Seine
- Mr. Pierre Frogier, UMP, New Caledonia
- Mr. Yves Fromion, UMP, Cher

== G ==
- Mr. Claude Gaillard, UMP, Meurthe-et-Moselle
- Ms. Cécile Gallez, associated with UMP, Nord
- Mr. René Galy-Dejean, UMP, Paris
- Mr. Gilbert Gantier, UDF, Paris
- Mr. Daniel Gard, UMP, Aisne
- Mr. Jean-Paul Garraud, UMP, Gironde
- Mr. Daniel Garrigue, UMP, Dordogne
- Mr. Claude Gatignol, UMP, Manche
- Mr. Jean Gaubert, socialist, Côtes-d'Armor
- Mr. Jean de Gaulle, UMP, Paris
- Mr. Jean-Jacques Gaultier, UMP, Vosges
- Ms. Nathalie Gautier, socialist, Rhône
- Ms. Catherine Génisson, socialist, Pas-de-Calais
- Mr. Guy Geoffroy, UMP, Seine-et-Marne
- Mr. André Gerin, communist, Rhône
- Mr. Alain Gest, UMP, Somme
- Mr. Jean-Marie Geveaux, UMP, Sarthe
- Mr. Paul Giacobbi, associated with socialist, Haute-Corse
- Mr. Franck Gilard, UMP, Eure
- Mr. Bruno Gilles, UMP, Bouches-du-Rhône
- Mr. Georges Ginesta, UMP, Var
- Mr. Jean-Pierre Giran, UMP, Var
- Mr. Claude Girard, UMP, Doubs
- Mr. Joël Giraud, associated with socialist, Hautes-Alpes
- Mr. Maurice Giro, UMP, Vaucluse
- Mr. Louis Giscard d'Estaing, UMP, Puy-de-Dôme
- Mr. Jean Glavany, socialist, Hautes-Pyrénées
- Mr. Claude Goasguen, UMP, Paris
- Mr. Jacques Godfrain, UMP, Aveyron
- Mr. Pierre Goldberg, communist, Allier
- Mr. François-Michel Gonnot, UMP, Oise
- Mr. Gaëtan Gorce, socialist, Nièvre
- Mr. Jean-Pierre Gorges, UMP, Eure-et-Loir
- Mr. François Goulard, UMP, Morbihan
- Mr. Alain Gouriou, socialist, Côtes-d'Armor
- Mr. Jean-Pierre Grand, UMP, Hérault
- Ms. Claude Greff, UMP, Indre-et-Loire
- Mr. Maxime Gremetz, communist, Somme
- Mr. Jean Grenet, UMP, Pyrénées-Atlantiques
- Mr. Gérard Grignon, associated with UMP, Saint-Pierre-et-Miquelon
- Mr. François Grosdidier, UMP, Moselle
- Ms. Arlette Grosskost, UMP, Haut-Rhin
- Mr. Serge Grouard, UMP, Loiret
- Mr. Louis Guédon, UMP, Vendée
- Mr. Jean-Claude Guibal, UMP, Alpes-Maritimes
- Mr. Lucien Guichon, UMP, Ain
- Ms. Élisabeth Guigou, socialist, Seine-Saint-Denis
- Mr. François Guillaume, UMP, Meurthe-et-Moselle
- Mr. Jean-Jacques Guillet, UMP, Hauts-de-Seine
- Ms. Paulette Guinchard-Kunstler, socialist, Doubs

== H ==
- Mr. David Habib, socialist, Pyrénées-Atlantiques
- Mr. Georges Hage, communist, Nord
- Mr. Gérard Hamel, UMP, Eure-et-Loir
- Mr. Emmanuel Hamelin, UMP, Rhône
- Mr. Joël Hart, UMP, Somme
- Mr. Michel Heinrich, UMP, Vosges
- Mr. Pierre Hellier, UMP, Sarthe
- Mr. Laurent Hénart, UMP, Meurthe-et-Moselle
- Mr. Michel Herbillon, UMP, Val-de-Marne
- Mr. Pierre Hériaud, UMP, Loire-Atlantique
- Mr. Patrick Herr, UMP, Seine-Maritime
- Mr. Antoine Herth, associated with UMP, Bas-Rhin
- Mr. Francis Hillmeyer, UDF, Haut-Rhin
- Ms. Danièle Hoffman-Rispal, socialist, Paris
- Mr. François Hollande, socialist, Corrèze
- Mr. Philippe Houillon, UMP, Val-d'Oise
- Mr. Jean-Yves Hugon, UMP, Indre
- Mr. Michel Hunault, UMP, Loire-Atlantique
- Mr. Sébastien Huyghe, UMP, Nord

== I ==
- Mr. Jean-Louis Idiart, socialist, Haute-Garonne
- Ms. Françoise Imbert, socialist, Haute-Garonne

== J ==
- Ms. Muguette Jacquaint, communist, Seine-Saint-Denis
- Mr. Denis Jacquat, UMP, Moselle
- Mr. Édouard Jacque, UMP, Meurthe-et-Moselle
- Mr. Éric Jalton, independent, Guadeloupe
- Ms. Janine Jambu, communist, Hauts-de-Seine
- Mr. Serge Janquin, socialist, Pas-de-Calais
- Mr. Olivier Jardé, UDF, Somme
- Mr. Christian Jeanjean, UMP, Hérault
- Mr. Yves Jego, UMP, Seine-et-Marne
- Ms. Maryse Joissains-Masini, UMP, Bouches-du-Rhône
- Mr. Marc Joulaud, UMP, Sarthe
- Mr. Alain Joyandet, UMP, Haute-Saône
- Mr. Dominique Juillot, UMP, Saône-et-Loire
- Mr. Didier Julia, UMP, Seine-et-Marne
- Mr. Armand Jung, socialist, Bas-Rhin
- Mr. Alain Juppé, UMP, Gironde

== K ==
- Mr. Mansour Kamardine, UMP, Mayotte
- Mr. Aimé Kergueris, UMP, Morbihan
- Mr. Christian Kert, UMP, Bouches-du-Rhône
- Ms. Nathalie Kosciusko-Morizet, UMP, Essonne
- Mr. Jacques Kossowski, UMP, Hauts-de-Seine
- Mr. Jean-Pierre Kucheida, socialist, Pas-de-Calais

== L ==
- Mr. Patrick Labaune, UMP, Drôme
- Mr. Yvan Lachaud, UDF, Gard
- Ms. Conchita Lacuey, socialist, Gironde
- Mr. Marc Laffineur, UMP, Maine-et-Loire
- Mr. Jacques Lafleur, UMP, New Caledonia
- Mr. Jean-Christophe Lagarde, UDF, Seine-Saint-Denis
- Mr. Jérôme Lambert, socialist, Charente
- Ms. Marguerite Lamour, UMP, Finistère
- Mr. François Lamy, socialist, Essonne
- Mr. Robert Lamy, UMP, Rhône
- Mr. Édouard Landrain, UMP, Loire-Atlantique
- Mr. Jack Lang, socialist, Pas-de-Calais
- Mr. Pierre Lang, UMP, Moselle
- Mr. Pierre Lasbordes, UMP, Essonne
- Mr. Jean Lassalle, UDF, Pyrénées-Atlantiques
- Mr. Jean Launay, socialist, Lot
- Mr. Thierry Lazaro, UMP, Nord
- Mr. Jean-Yves Le Bouillonnec, socialist, Val-de-Marne
- Ms. Marylise Lebranchu, socialist, Finistère
- Ms. Brigitte Le Brethon, UMP, Calvados
- Mr. Gilbert Le Bris, socialist, Finistère
- Mr. Robert Lecou, UMP, Hérault
- Mr. Jean-Yves Le Déaut, socialist, Meurthe-et-Moselle
- Mr. Jean-Yves Le Drian, socialist, Morbihan
- Mr. Michel Lefait, socialist, Pas-de-Calais
- Mr. Jean-Claude Lefort, communist, Val-de-Marne
- Mr. Jean-Marc Lefranc, UMP, Calvados
- Mr. Marc Le Fur, UMP, Côtes-d'Armor
- Mr. Jean Le Garrec, socialist, Nord
- Mr. Jacques Le Guen, UMP, Finistère
- Mr. Jean-Marie Le Guen, socialist, Paris
- Mr. Michel Lejeune, UMP, Seine-Maritime
- Mr. Pierre Lellouche, UMP, Paris
- Mr. Patrick Lemasle, socialist, Haute-Garonne
- Mr. Dominique Le Mèner, UMP, Sarthe
- Mr. Jean Lemière, UMP, Manche
- Mr. Jean-Claude Lemoine, UMP, Manche
- Mr. Jacques Le Nay, UMP, Morbihan
- Mr. Guy Lengagne, socialist, Pas-de-Calais
- Mr. Jean-Claude Lenoir, UMP, Orne
- Mr. Gérard Léonard, UMP, Meurthe-et-Moselle
- Mr. Jean-Louis Léonard, UMP, Charente-Maritime
- Mr. Jean Leonetti, UMP, Alpes-Maritimes
- Mr. Arnaud Lepercq, UMP, Vienne
- Ms. Annick Lepetit, independent, Paris
- Mr. Pierre Lequiller, UMP, Yvelines
- Mr. Jean-Pierre Le Ridant, UMP, Loire-Atlantique
- Mr. Bruno Le Roux, socialist, Seine-Saint-Denis
- Mr. Jean-Claude Leroy, socialist, Pas-de-Calais
- Mr. Maurice Leroy, UDF, Loir-et-Cher
- Mr. Claude Leteurtre, UDF, Calvados
- Mr. Céleste Lett, UMP, Moselle
- Mr. Édouard Leveau, UMP, Seine-Maritime
- Ms. Geneviève Levy, UMP, Var
- Mr. François Liberti, communist, Hérault
- Mr. Michel Liebgott, socialist, Moselle
- Ms. Martine Lignières-Cassou, socialist, Pyrénées-Atlantiques
- Mr. François Loncle, socialist, Eure
- Mr. Gérard Lorgeoux, UMP, Morbihan
- Ms. Gabrielle Louis-Carabin, UMP, Guadeloupe
- Mr. Lionnel Luca, UMP, Alpes-Maritimes
- Mr. Victorin Lurel, socialist, Guadeloupe

== M ==
- Mr. Daniel Mach, UMP, Pyrénées-Orientales
- Mr. Alain Madelin, UMP, Ille-et-Vilaine
- Mr. Bernard Madrelle, socialist, Gironde
- Mr. Richard Mallié, UMP, Bouches-du-Rhône
- Mr. Noël Mamère, independent, Gironde
- Mr. Jean-François Mancel, UMP, Oise
- Mr. Louis-Joseph Manscour, socialist, Martinique
- Mr. Thierry Mariani, UMP, Vaucluse
- Mr. Alfred Marie-Jeanne, independent, Martinique
- Mr. Hervé Mariton, UMP, Drôme
- Ms. Muriel Marland-Militello, UMP, Alpes-Maritimes
- Mr. Alain Marleix, UMP, Cantal
- Mr. Franck Marlin, associated with UMP, Essonne
- Mr. Alain Marsaud, UMP, Haute-Vienne
- Mr. Jean Marsaudon, UMP, Essonne
- Mr. Philippe Martin, socialist, Gers
- Mr. Philippe Armand Martin, UMP, Marne
- Ms. Henriette Martinez, UMP, Hautes-Alpes
- Mr. Patrice Martin-Lalande, UMP, Loir-et-Cher
- Mr. Alain Marty, UMP, Moselle
- Mr. Jacques Masdeu-Arus, UMP, Yvelines
- Mr. Christophe Masse, socialist, Bouches-du-Rhône
- Mr. Jean-Claude Mathis, UMP, Aube
- Mr. Didier Mathus, socialist, Saône-et-Loire
- Mr. Pierre Méhaignerie, UMP, Ille-et-Vilaine
- Mr. Christian Ménard, UMP, Finistère
- Mr. Alain Merly, UMP, Lot-et-Garonne
- Mr. Denis Merville, UMP, Seine-Maritime
- Mr. Damien Meslot, UMP, Territoire de Belfort
- Mr. Kléber Mesquida, socialist, Hérault
- Mr. Gilbert Meyer, UMP, Haut-Rhin
- Mr. Pierre Micaux, UMP, Aube
- Mr. Jean Michel, socialist, Puy-de-Dôme
- Mr. Didier Migaud, socialist, Isère
- Ms. Hélène Mignon, socialist, Haute-Garonne
- Mr. Jean-Claude Mignon, UMP, Seine-et-Marne
- Ms. Marie-Anne Montchamp, UMP, Val-de-Marne
- Mr. Arnaud Montebourg, socialist, Saône-et-Loire
- Mr. Pierre Morange, UMP, Yvelines
- Ms. Nadine Morano, UMP, Meurthe-et-Moselle
- Mr. Pierre Morel-A-L'Huissier, UMP, Lozère
- Mr. Hervé Morin, UDF, Eure
- Mr. Jean-Marie Morisset, UMP, Deux-Sèvres
- Mr. Georges Mothron, independent, Val-d'Oise
- Mr. Étienne Mourrut, UMP, Gard
- Mr. Alain Moyne-Bressand, UMP, Isère
- Mr. Jacques Myard, UMP, Yvelines

== N ==
- Mr. Henri Nayrou, socialist, Ariège
- Mr. Alain Néri, socialist, Puy-de-Dôme
- Mr. Jean-Marc Nesme, UMP, Saône-et-Loire
- Mr. Jean-Pierre Nicolas, UMP, Eure
- Mr. Yves Nicolin, UMP, Loire
- Mr. Hervé Novelli, UMP, Indre-et-Loire
- Mr. Jean-Marc Nudant, UMP, Côte-d'Or

== O ==
- Ms. Marie-Renée Oget, socialist, Côtes-d'Armor
- Mr. Patrick Ollier, UMP, Hauts-de-Seine

== P ==
- Mr. Dominique Paillé, UMP, Deux-Sèvres
- Mr. Michel Pajon, socialist, Seine-Saint-Denis
- Ms. Françoise de Panafieu, UMP, Paris
- Mr. Robert Pandraud, UMP, Seine-Saint-Denis
- Mr. Christian Paul, socialist, Nièvre
- Mr. Daniel Paul, communist, Seine-Maritime
- Ms. Béatrice Pavy, UMP, Sarthe
- Mr. Christophe Payet, socialist, Réunion
- Ms. Valérie Pécresse, UMP, Yvelines
- Mr. Germinal Peiro, socialist, Dordogne
- Mr. Jacques Pélissard, UMP, Jura
- Mr. Philippe Pemezec, UMP, Hauts-de-Seine
- Mr. Jean-Claude Perez, socialist, Aude
- Mr. Pierre-André Périssol, UMP, Allier
- Ms. Marie-Françoise Pérol-Dumont, socialist, Haute-Vienne
- Ms. Geneviève Perrin-Gaillard, socialist, Deux-Sèvres
- Mr. Nicolas Perruchot, UDF, Loir-et-Cher
- Mr. Bernard Perrut, UMP, Rhône
- Mr. Christian Philip, UMP, Rhône
- Mr. Étienne Pinte, UMP, Yvelines
- Mr. Michel Piron, UMP, Maine-et-Loire
- Mr. Serge Poignant, UMP, Loire-Atlantique
- Ms. Bérengère Poletti, UMP, Ardennes
- Mr. Axel Poniatowski, UMP, Val-d'Oise
- Ms. Josette Pons, UMP, Var
- Mr. Daniel Poulou, UMP, Pyrénées-Atlantiques
- Mr. Jean-Luc Préel, UDF, Vendée
- Mr. Daniel Prévost, UMP, Ille-et-Vilaine
- Mr. Christophe Priou, UMP, Loire-Atlantique
- Mr. Jean Proriol, UMP, Haute-Loire

== Q ==
- Mr. Didier Quentin, UMP, Charente-Maritime
- Mr. Jean-Jack Queyranne, socialist, Rhône
- Mr. Paul Quilès, socialist, Tarn

== R ==
- Mr. Michel Raison, UMP, Haute-Saône
- Ms. Marcelle Ramonet, UMP, Finistère
- Mr. Éric Raoult, UMP, Seine-Saint-Denis
- Mr. Jean-François Régère, UMP, Gironde
- Mr. Frédéric Reiss, UMP, Bas-Rhin
- Mr. Jean-Luc Reitzer, UMP, Haut-Rhin
- Mr. Jacques Remiller, UMP, Isère
- Mr. Simon Renucci, associated with socialist, Corse-du-Sud
- Mr. Marc Reymann, UMP, Bas-Rhin
- Mr. Dominique Richard, UMP, Maine-et-Loire
- Ms. Juliana Rimane, UMP, Guyane
- Mr. Jérôme Rivière, UMP, Alpes-Maritimes
- Mr. Jean Roatta, UMP, Bouches-du-Rhône
- Ms. Chantal Robin-Rodrigo, associated with socialist, Hautes-Pyrénées
- Mr. Camille de Rocca Serra, UMP, Corse-du-Sud
- Mr. François Rochebloine, UDF, Loire
- Mr. Alain Rodet, socialist, Haute-Vienne
- Ms. Marie-Josée Roig, UMP, Vaucluse
- Mr. Vincent Rolland, UMP, Savoie
- Mr. Jean-Marie Rolland, UMP, Yonne
- Mr. Bernard Roman, socialist, Nord
- Mr. Serge Roques, UMP, Aveyron
- Mr. Philippe Rouault, UMP, Ille-et-Vilaine
- Mr. Jean-Marc Roubaud, UMP, Gard
- Mr. Michel Roumegoux, UMP, Lot
- Mr. René Rouquet, socialist, Val-de-Marne
- Mr. Max Roustan, UMP, Gard
- Mr. Xavier de Roux, UMP, Charente-Maritime
- Mr. Patrick Roy, socialist, Nord
- Ms. Ségolène Royal, socialist, Deux-Sèvres

== S ==
- Mr. Martial Saddier, UMP, Haute-Savoie
- Mr. Michel Sainte-Marie, socialist, Gironde
- Mr. Francis Saint-Léger, UMP, Lozère
- Mr. Frédéric de Saint-Sernin, UMP, Dordogne
- Mr. Rudy Salles, UDF, Alpes-Maritimes
- Mr. André Samitier, associated with UMP, Yvelines
- Mr. Pierre-Jean Samot, independent, Martinique
- Mr. Jean-Claude Sandrier, communist, Cher
- Mr. André Santini, UDF, Hauts-de-Seine
- Mr. Joël Sarlot, independent, Vendée
- Ms. Odile Saugues, socialist, Puy-de-Dôme
- Mr. François Sauvadet, UDF, Côte-d'Or
- Mr. François Scellier, UMP, Val-d'Oise
- Mr. André Schneider, UMP, Bas-Rhin
- Mr. Bernard Schreiner, UMP, Bas-Rhin
- Mr. Roger-Gérard Schwartzenberg, associated with socialist, Val-de-Marne
- Mr. Jean-Marie Sermier, UMP, Jura
- Mr. Henri Sicre, socialist, Pyrénées-Orientales
- Mr. Georges Siffredi, UMP, Hauts-de-Seine
- Mr. Yves Simon, associated with UMP, Allier
- Mr. Jean-Pierre Soisson, UMP, Yonne
- Mr. Michel Sordi, UMP, Haut-Rhin
- Mr. Frédéric Soulier, UMP, Corrèze
- Mr. Daniel Spagnou, UMP, Alpes-de-Haute-Provence
- Mr. Dominique Strauss-Kahn, socialist, Val-d'Oise
- Mr. Alain Suguenot, UMP, Côte-d'Or

== T ==
- Ms. Michèle Tabarot, UMP, Alpes-Maritimes
- Ms. Hélène Tanguy, UMP, Finistère
- Ms. Christiane Taubira, associated with socialist, Guyane
- Mr. Jean-Charles Taugourdeau, UMP, Maine-et-Loire
- Mr. Guy Teissier, UMP, Bouches-du-Rhône
- Mr. Pascal Terrasse, socialist, Ardèche
- Mr. Michel Terrot, UMP, Rhône
- Ms. Irène Tharin, UMP, Doubs
- Mr. André Thien Ah Koon, associated with UMP, Réunion
- Mr. Jean-Claude Thomas, UMP, Marne
- Mr. Rodolphe Thomas, UDF, Calvados
- Mr. Dominique Tian, UMP, Bouches-du-Rhône
- Mr. Jean Tiberi, UMP, Paris
- Mr. Philippe Tourtelier, socialist, Ille-et-Vilaine
- Mr. Alfred Trassy-Paillogues, UMP, Seine-Maritime
- Mr. Georges Tron, UMP, Essonne

== U ==
- Mr. Jean Ueberschlag, UMP, Haut-Rhin

== V ==
- Mr. Léon Vachet, UMP, Bouches-du-Rhône
- Mr. Daniel Vaillant, socialist, Paris
- Mr. André Vallini, socialist, Isère
- Mr. Manuel Valls, socialist, Essonne
- Mr. Christian Vanneste, UMP, Nord
- Mr. François Vannson, associated with UMP, Vosges
- Ms. Catherine Vautrin, UMP, Marne
- Mr. Michel Vaxès, communist, Bouches-du-Rhône
- Mr. Alain Venot, UMP, Eure-et-Loir
- Mr. Francis Vercamer, UDF, Nord
- Mr. Michel Vergnier, socialist, Creuse
- Ms. Béatrice Vernaudon, UMP, French Polynesia
- Mr. Jean-Sébastien Vialatte, UMP, Var
- Mr. René-Paul Victoria, UMP, Réunion
- Mr. Alain Vidalies, socialist, Landes
- Mr. Gérard Vignoble, UDF, Nord
- Mr. François-Xavier Villain, independent, Nord
- Mr. Philippe de Villiers, independent, Vendée
- Mr. Jean-Claude Viollet, socialist, Charente
- Mr. Philippe Vitel, UMP, Var
- Mr. Gérard Voisin, UMP, Saône-et-Loire
- Mr. Michel Voisin, UMP, Ain
- Mr. Philippe Vuilque, socialist, Ardennes

== W ==
- Mr. Jean-Luc Warsmann, UMP, Ardennes
- Mr. Gérard Weber, UMP, Ardèche
- Mr. Éric Woerth, UMP, Oise

== Z ==
- Ms. Marie-Jo Zimmermann, UMP, Moselle
- Mr. Émile Zuccarelli, independent, Haute-Corse
- Mr. Michel Zumkeller, UMP, Territoire de Belfort
