= Alain Cacheux =

French politician (1947–2020)

Alain Cacheux (15 November 1947 – 26 July 2020) was a French politician and member of the National Assembly of France. He represented the Nord department, and was a member of the Socialiste, radical, citoyen et divers gauche.
