= Alfred Almont =

French politician

Member of the National Assembly of France for 2nd Constituency of Martinique
- Incumbent
- Assumed office 2002 French legislative election

Member of the Municipal council of Schœlcher

Personal details
- Born: 15 September 1944 (age 81) Schœlcher, Martinique, French West Indies
- Party: Radical Party
- Other political affiliations: Union for a Popular Movement
- Committees: Economic, Environmental and Regional Planning Committee

Alfred Almont (born 15 September 1944 in Schœlcher, Martinique) is a member of the National Assembly of France as a representative of the island of Martinique. A member of the French Radical Party, Almont works in association with the Union for a Popular Movement.
