= François-Michel Gonnot =

French politician

François-Michel Gonnot (born April 15, 1949, in Arpajon, Essonne) is a French politician.

He was elected on June 16, 2002, for the XIIe legislature (2002–2007), in the arrondissement of Oise (6th). He belongs to the group UMP.

Mandates:

14 March 1983 - 19 March 1989 :assistant of the mayor of Compiègne (Oise)
17 March 1986 - 22 March 1992 :vice-president of the regional council of Picardy
13 June 1988 - 1 April 1993 :deputy
20 March 1989 - 18 June 1995 :assistant of the mayor of Compiegne (Oise)
23 March 1992 - 15 March 1998 :vice-president of the regional council of Picardy
2 April 1993 - 21 April 1997 :deputy
19 June 1995 - 18 March 2001 :assistant of the mayor of Compiegne (Oise)
16 March 1998 - 1 November 2001 :member of the regional council of Picardy
23 March 1998 - 27 September 2002 :vice-president of the general council of Oise

Mandate to the 16 June 2002:

Assistant of the mayor of Compiègne, Oise.
