= Jean-Philippe Maurer =

French politician

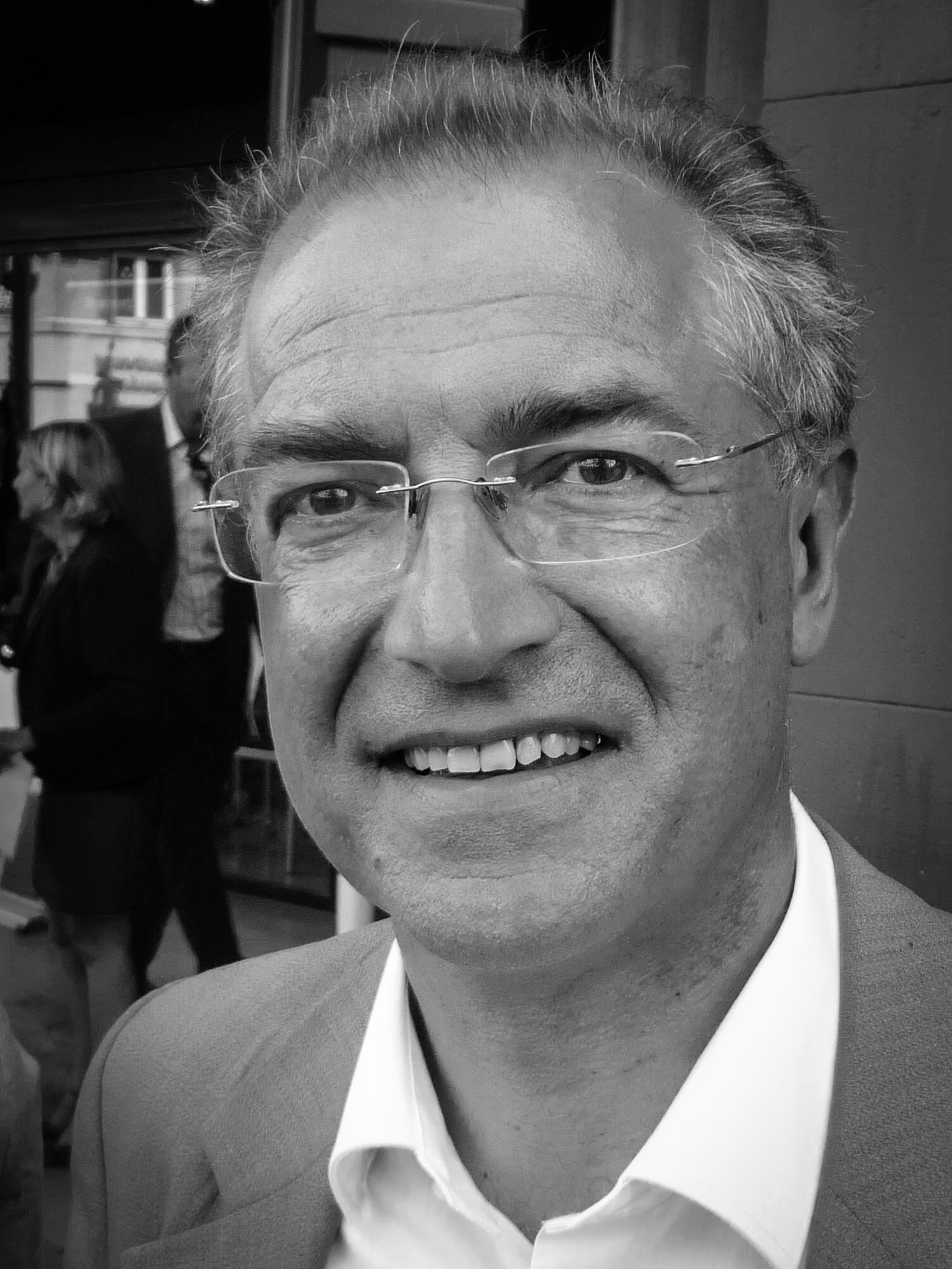
Jean-Philippe Maurer, 2013 .

Jean-Philippe Maurer (born 7 July 1960 in Strasbourg) was a member of the National Assembly of France between 2007 and 2012. He represented the Bas-Rhin department, and was a member of the Union for a Popular Movement.

He is member of the general council of the Bas-Rhin.
