= Jacqueline Irles =

French politician (born 1957)

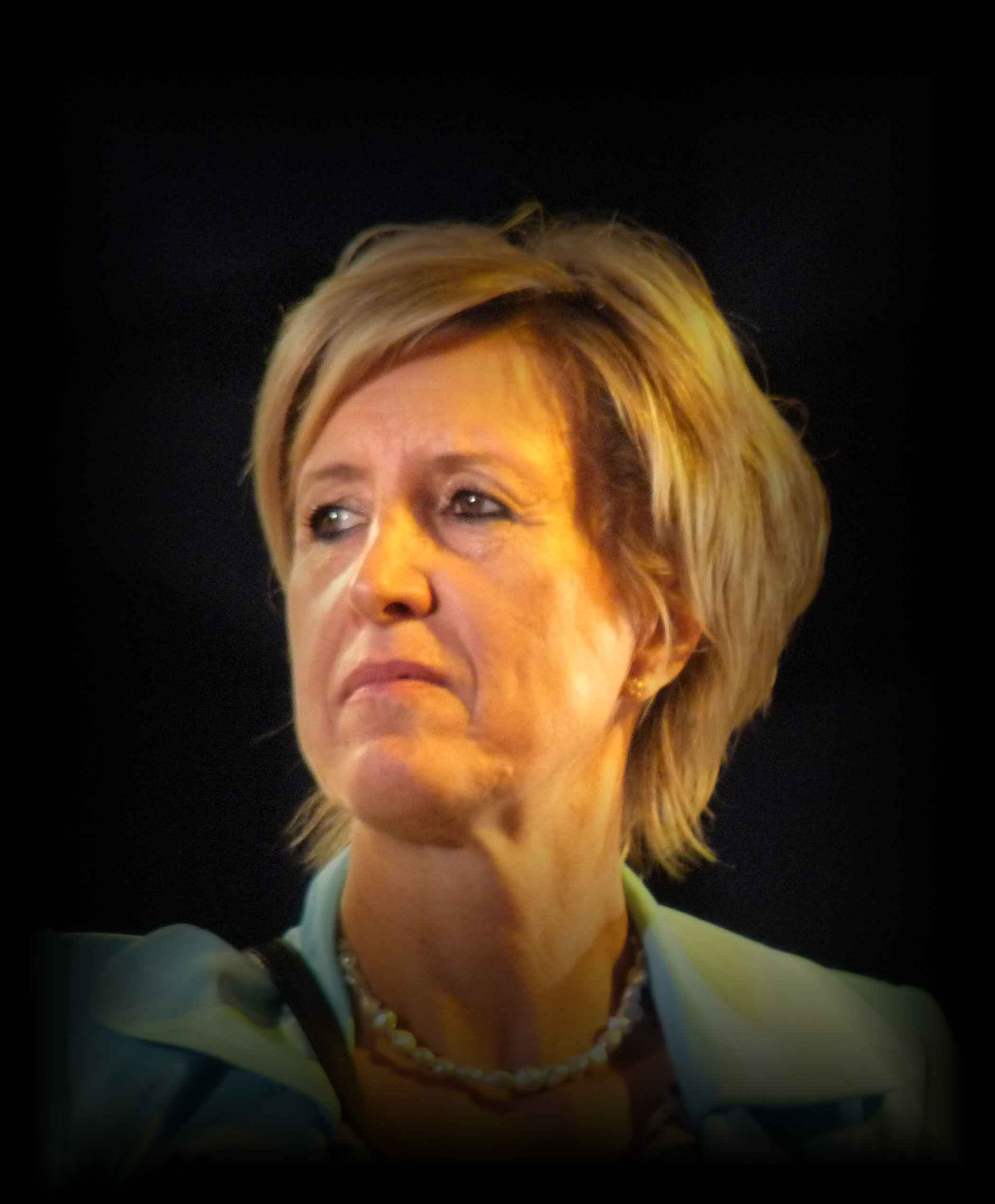
In Port-Vendres on 10 August 2011

Jacqueline Irles (born 24 May 1957 in Perpignan, Pyrénées-Orientales) is a member of the National Assembly of France. She represents the Pyrénées-Orientales department, and is a member of the Radical Party.
