= Jean-Luc Pérat =

French politician (born 1950)

Jean-Luc Pérat (born 23 January 1950 in Hirson) is a member of the National Assembly of France. He represents the Nord department, and is a member of the Socialiste, radical, citoyen et divers gauche.
