= 2002 French legislative election =

- 9 June 2002 (first round); 16 June 2002 (second round)

All 577 seats in the National Assembly 289 seats needed for a majority
- Turnout: 64.42% (▼3.50pp) (first round); 60.32% (▼10.75pp) (second round)
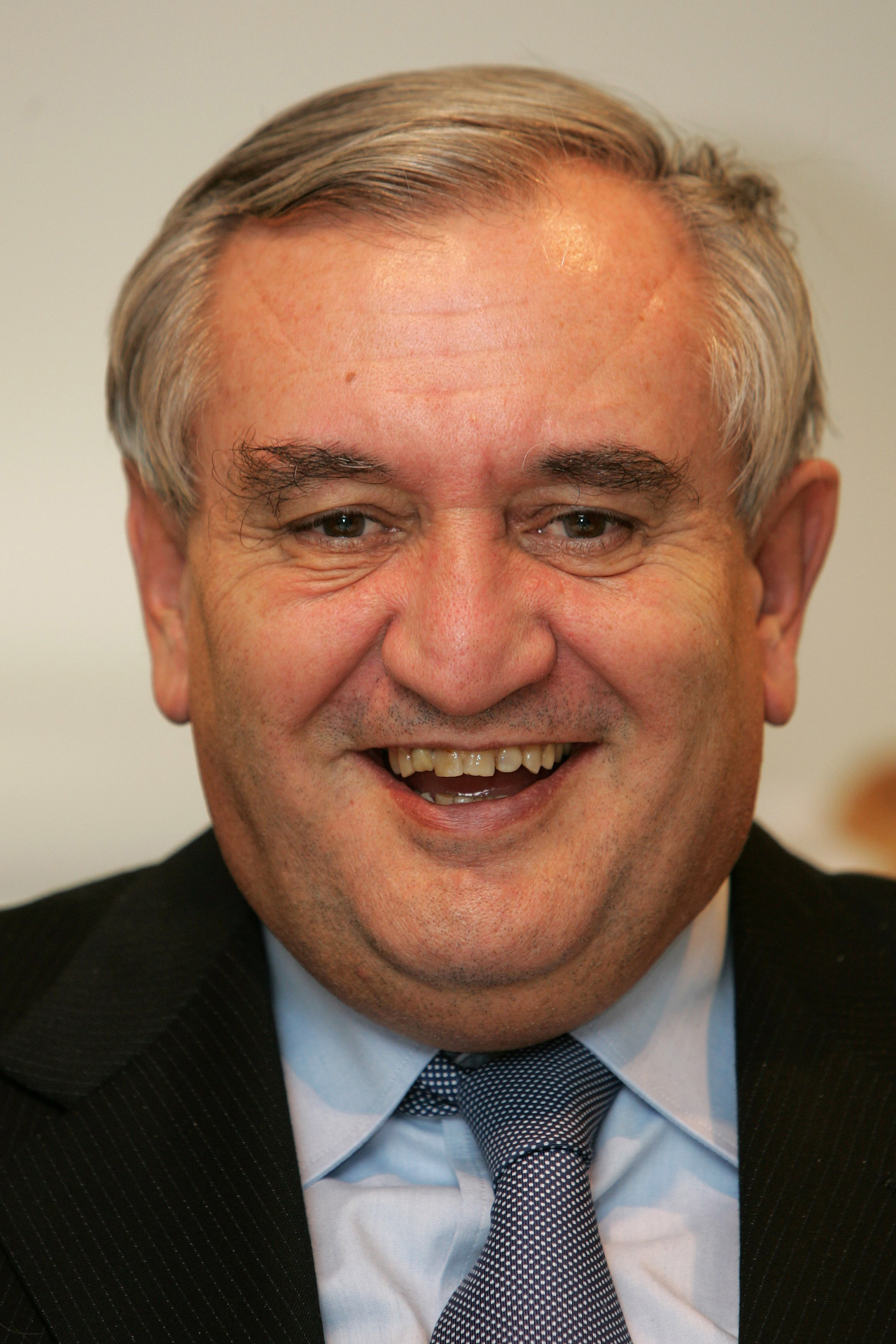

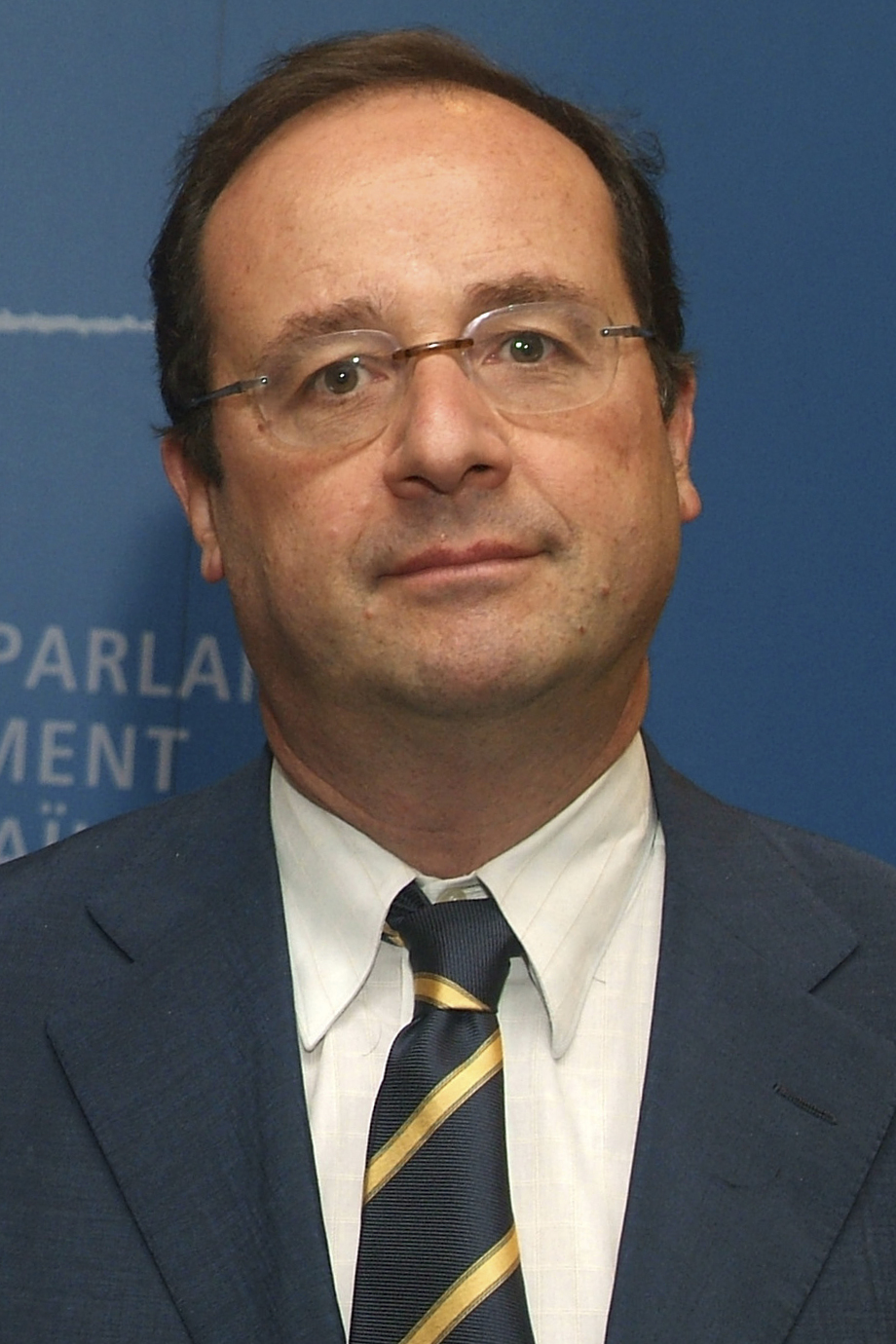

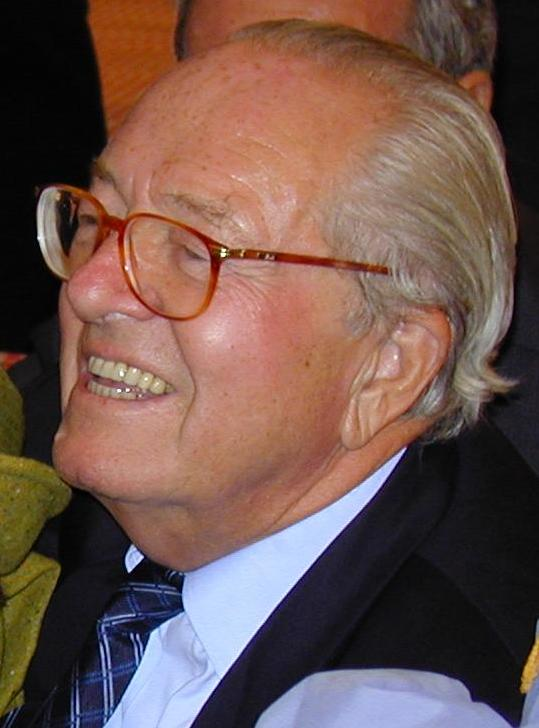
	First party	Second party	Third party
Leader	Jean-Pierre Raffarin	François Hollande	Jean-Marie Le Pen
Party	UMP	PS	FN
Leader's seat	Vienne (Senate)	Corrèze-1st	none
Last election	New alliance	255 seats, 23.5%	1 seat, 14.9%
Seats won	357	140	0
Seat change	▲357	▼115	▼1
First round	8,408,023	6,086,599	2,862,960
% and swing	33.30%	24.11% (▲0.58%)	11.34% (▼3.6%)
Second round	10,026,669	7,482,169	393,205
% and swing	47.26%	35.26% (▼2.79%)	1.85% (▼3.75%)
Prime Minister before election
Jean-Pierre Raffarin
UMP
Elected Prime Minister
Jean-Pierre Raffarin
UMP

Legislative elections were held in France on 9 and 16 June 2002, to elect the 12th National Assembly of the Fifth Republic, in a context of political crisis.

The Socialist Prime Minister Lionel Jospin announced his political retirement after his elimination at the first round of the 2002 presidential elections. President Jacques Chirac was easily reelected, all the Republican parties having called to block far-right leader Jean-Marie Le Pen. Chirac's conservative supporters created the Union for the Presidential Majority (Union pour la majorité présidentielle or UMP) to prepare for the legislative elections.

The first round of the presidential election was a shock for the two main coalitions. The candidates of the parliamentary right obtained 32% of votes, and the candidates of the "Plural Left" only 27%. In the first polls, for the legislative elections, they were equal.

The UMP campaigned against "cohabitation", which is blamed for causing confusion profitable to the far-right and far-left. Jean-Pierre Raffarin, a relatively low-profile politician who said he would listen to "France at the bottom", was chosen as the party's candidate for Prime Minister.

Without a real leader, and staggered by the results of 21 April, the left was in difficulty. The Socialist chairman François Hollande tried to revive the "Plural Left" under the name of "United Left"; but the effort was undermined by the fact that it did not have a sufficiently concrete programme. Furthermore, the left-wing parties could not motivate their voters against an unrecognized and apparently uncontroversial politician like Raffarin. In addition part of the left-wing electorate did not want a new "cohabitation". Finally, the polls indicated a growing advantage for the Presidential Majority.

The right won the elections and the UMP obtained a large parliamentary majority of 394 seats. For the third time under the Fifth Republic, a party acquired an absolute majority (the "blue surge"). Five months later, it became the Union for a Popular Movement.

On the left, the Socialist Party achieved a better result than at the winning 1997 elections, but its allies were crushed. The far-left returned towards its usual level. In far-right, the National Front lost half of its 5 May voters.

== Opinion polls ==
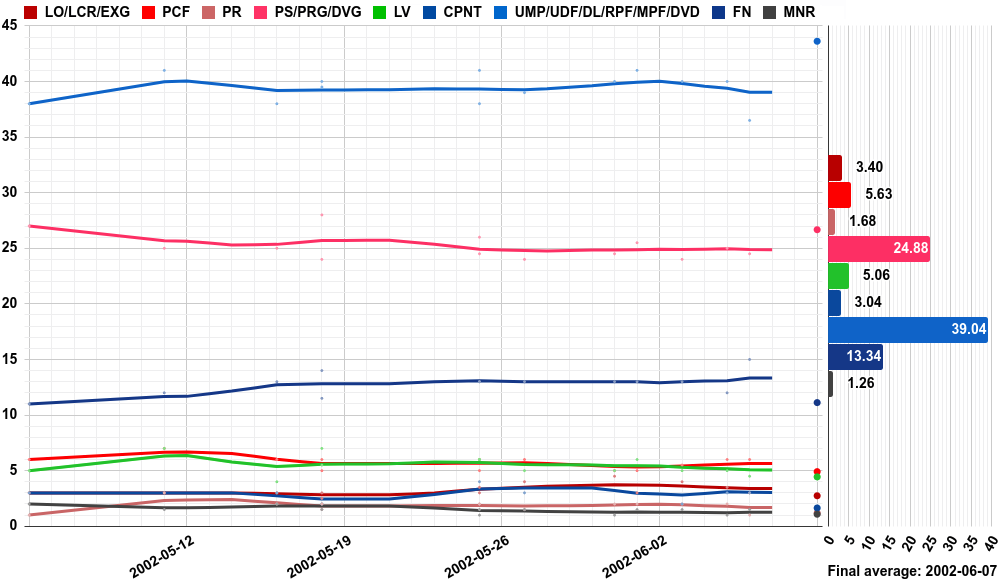

== Results ==
Party	First round			Second round			Total seats
Party	Votes	%	Seats	Votes	%	Seats	Total seats
Union for a Popular Movement	8,408,023	33.30	48	10,029,669	47.26	309	357
Socialist Party	6,086,599	24.11	1	7,482,169	35.26	139	140
National Front	2,862,960	11.34	0	393,205	1.85	0	0
Union for French Democracy	1,226,462	4.86	6	832,785	3.92	21	27
French Communist Party	1,216,178	4.82	0	690,807	3.26	21	21
The Greens	1,138,222	4.51	0	677,933	3.19	3	3
Miscellaneous right	921,973	3.65	3	274,374	1.29	6	9
Hunting, Fishing, Nature, Traditions	422,448	1.67	0				0
Radical Party of the Left	388,891	1.54	0	455,360	2.15	7	7
Revolutionary Communist League	320,467	1.27	0				0
Lutte Ouvrière	301,984	1.20	0				0
Republican Pole	299,897	1.19	0	12,679	0.06	0	0
Ecologists	295,899	1.17	0				0
National Republican Movement	276,376	1.09	0				0
Miscellaneous left	275,553	1.09	0	268,715	1.27	6	6
Movement for France	202,831	0.80	1			1	1
Miscellaneous	194,946	0.77	0	13,036	0.06	1	1
Liberal Democracy	104,767	0.41	1			1	2
Rally for France	94,222	0.37	0	61,605	0.29	2	2
Far-left	81,558	0.32	0				0
Regionalists and separatists	66,240	0.26	0	28,689	0.14	1	1
Far-right	59,549	0.24	0				0
Total	25,246,045	100.00	60	21,221,026	100.00	518	577
Valid votes	25,246,045	95.67		21,221,026	95.65		
Invalid/blank votes	1,143,830	4.33		965,139	4.35		
Total votes	26,389,875	100.00		22,186,165	100.00		
Registered voters/turnout	40,968,484	64.42		36,783,746	60.32		
Source: Ministry of the Interior National Assembly

=== Parliamentary groups in the National Assembly ===
Party	Seats
UMP Group	364
Socialist Group	149
UDF Group	30
French Communist Party Group	22
Non-Inscrits	12
Total	577

== See also ==
- Deputies of the 12th National Assembly of France by constituency
- List of deputies of the 11th National Assembly of France
