= Jean-Marc Roubaud =

French politician

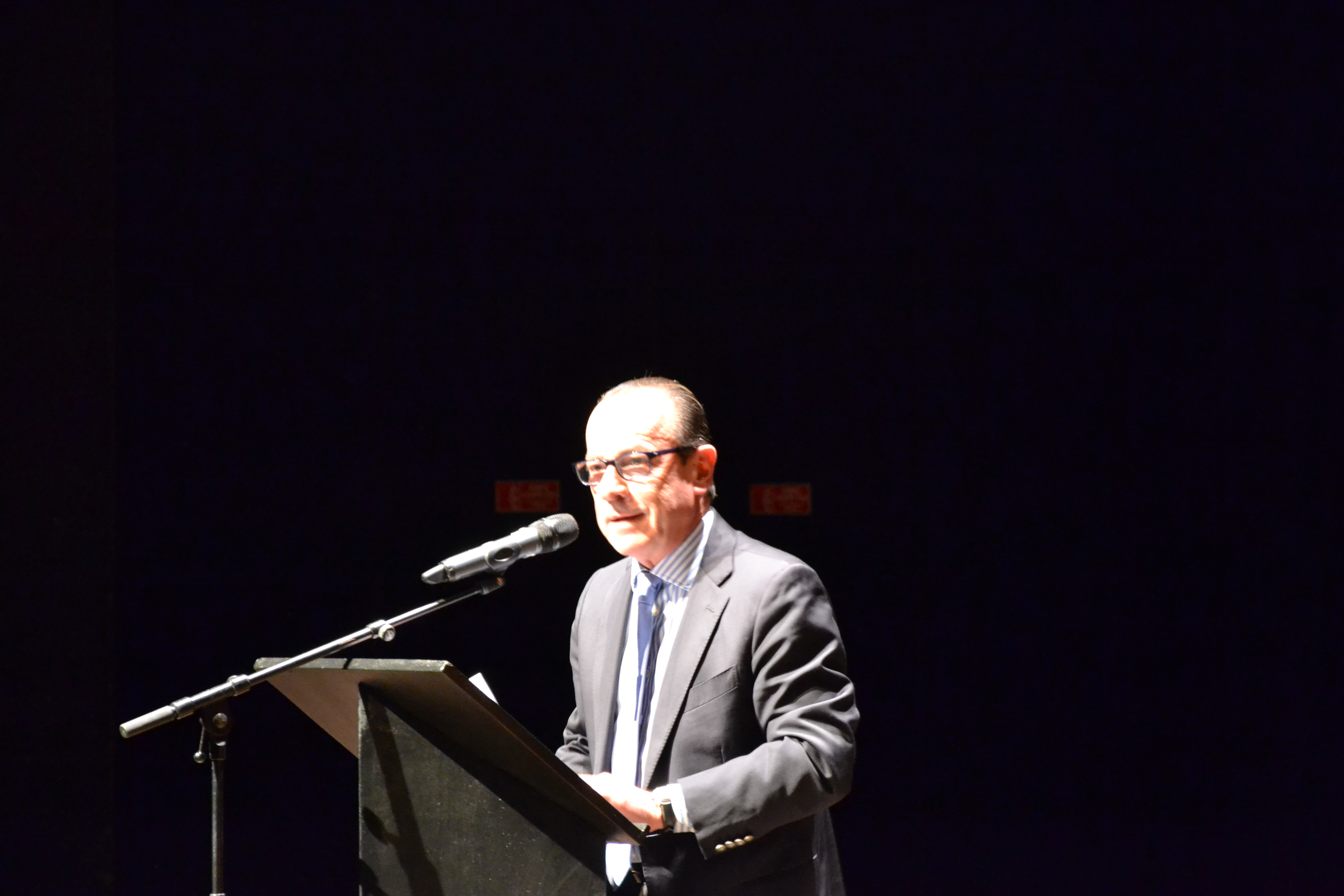
Jean-Marc Roubaud'

Jean-Marc Roubaud (born 18 June 1951 in Algiers) is a member of the National Assembly of France. He represents the Gard department, and is a member of the Union for a Popular Movement.

== Biography ==
After running in the 1997 legislative elections, he was elected deputy on June 16, 2002, for the 12th legislature (2002-2007), along with Yvan Lachaud, Étienne Mourrut, and Max Roustan, and was re-elected for the 13th legislature (2007-2012) in the third district of Gard. He is a member of the UMP group. His deputy is René Cret, former mayor of Bagnols-sur-Cèze.

In February 2006, following the Muhammad cartoon controversy, he submitted a bill to the National Assembly aimed at prohibiting offensive remarks and acts against all religions. This would have made it a criminal offense to caricature any religion or religious symbol. Ultimately, this bill would have reinstated the crime of blasphemy, which was abolished by the French Revolution.

A candidate in the 2007 legislative elections against Alexandre Pissas (Socialist Party (France)) and Pierre Jourlin, a teacher-researcher (Revolutionary Communist League (France)), he was re-elected as a deputy in the second round against Alexandre Pissas.

In February 2010, he wrote to President Nicolas Sarkozy asking for the ASTRID fast breeder reactor to be built in the Gard region at the Marcoule nuclear site in 2020.

He was a member of the National Assembly (France) study group on Tibet and the study group on bullfighting.

Running for re-election as a UMP deputy for the 14th legislature in the 3rd district of Gard, he lost on June 17, 2012, in the second round of a three-way race with 38.03% of the vote to Patrice Prat of the PS, who was elected with 41.44% of the vote.

Jean-Marc Roubaud was elected president of the Greater Avignon urban community on April 9, 2014, defeating Cécile Helle (PS), mayor of Avignon.

On April 17, 2019, he announced his resignation as president of the Communauté d'agglomération du Grand Avignon and his decision not to run for re-election in Avignon in the 2020 municipal elections. Patrick Vacaris (former mayor of Rochefort-du-Gard) thus became (interim) president of the Greater Avignon Urban Community. Jean-Marc Roubaud remained mayor of Villeneuve-lès-Avignon until May 27, 2020.
