= Michel Raison =

French politician (born 1949)

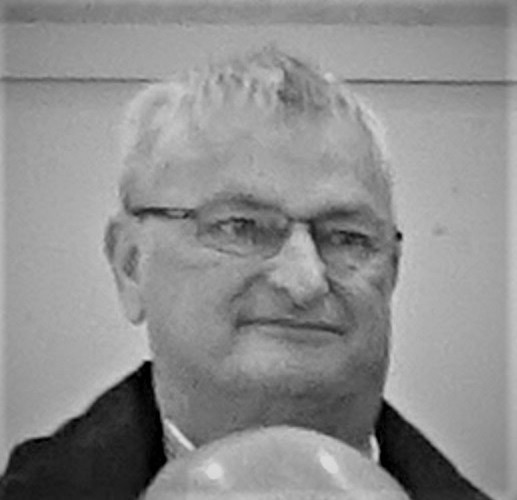

Michel Raison (French pronunciation: [miʃɛl ʁɛzɔ̃]; born November 5, 1949, in Besançon, Doubs) was a member of the National Assembly of France from 2007 to 2012. He represented the Haute-Saône department, and is a member of the Union for a Popular Movement. In septembre 2014, he became senator in the upper house for the Haute-Saône department.
