= Jean-Pierre Dupont =

French politician

Jean-Pierre Dupont (French pronunciation: [ʒɑ̃ pjɛʁ dypɔ̃]; born 19 June 1933) is a member of the National Assembly of France.

Dupont was born in Algiers, Algeria. He represents the Corrèze department, and is a member of the Union for a Popular Movement. He was President of the Corrèze General Council from 1992 to 2008.
