= Jean-François Chossy =

French politician

Jean-François Chossy (born 4 May 1947 in Montbrison, Loire) is a member of the National Assembly of France. He represents the Loire department, and is a member of the Christian Democratic Party.

== Biography ==
Jean-François Chossy focused his parliamentary activity on the issue of disability. He is the author of Law on Disability of 11 February 2005.
