= Jean Grenet =

French politician (1939–2021)

Jean Grenet (12 July 1939 – 23 February 2021) was a member of the National Assembly of France. He represented the Pyrénées-Atlantiques department, and was a member of the Radical Party.

He was born to politician Henri Grenet in Bayonne, Pyrénées-Atlantiques; both served as mayor of the town (Henri from 1959 to 1995, Jean from 1995 to 2014). His first wife Michou was the daughter of Jean Dauger, a French international in rugby union and one of the greats of Aviron Bayonnais, where Grenet served as club president (again following in the footsteps of his father in the role). His son François Grenet played as a professional footballer with clubs including Girondins de Bordeaux.
