= Jean-Yves Besselat =

French politician

Deputy of the National Assembly of France
- In office 1995 – 23 March 2012

Personal details
- Born: 21 December 1943 Quimper, Brittany, France
- Died: 23 March 2012 (aged 68)
- Occupation: Politician

Jean-Yves Besselat (21 December 1943 – 23 March 2012) was a member of the National Assembly of France.

Besselat was born in Quimper, Finistère. He represented the Seine-Maritime department, and was a member of the Union for a Popular Movement.
