= Claude Gatignol =

French politician

Claude Gatignol (born 20 November 1938 in Saint-Julien-près-Bort) is a member of the National Assembly of France. He represents the Manche department, and is a member of the Union for a Popular Movement.
