= Martine Aurillac =

French politician

Member of the National Assembly of France for Paris's 3rd constituency
- In office 2 May 1993 – 2012
- Preceded by: Michel Roussin
- Succeeded by: Annick Lepetit

Member of the Conseil de Paris
- In office 14 March 1983 – 25 September 2002

Mayor of the 7th arrondissement of Paris
- In office 19 June 1995 – 25 September 2002
- Preceded by: Édouard Frédéric-Dupont
- Succeeded by: Michel Dumont

Municipal councillor of the 7th arrondissement of Paris
- In office 14 March 1983 – 1 November 2002

Personal details
- Born: 28 April 1939 (age 86) Strasbourg, Bas-Rhin France
- Party: UMP
- Committees: Foreign Affairs Committee (Vice president)
- Website: Site

Martine Aurillac (born 28 April 1939) is a French politician who was a member of the National Assembly of France. She represented the city of Paris, and is a member of the Union for a Popular Movement.
