= Jean-Luc Préel =

French politician (1940–2015)

Member of the French National Assembly for Vendée
- In office 1988–2012

Personal details
- Born: 30 October 1940 Caen, France
- Died: 3 September 2015 (aged 74) La Roche-sur-Yon, France
- Party: New Centre

Jean-Luc Préel (30 October 1940 – 3 September 2015) was a member of the National Assembly of France. He represented the Vendée department, and was a member of the New Centre.
