= Marguerite Lamour =

French politician (1956–2026)

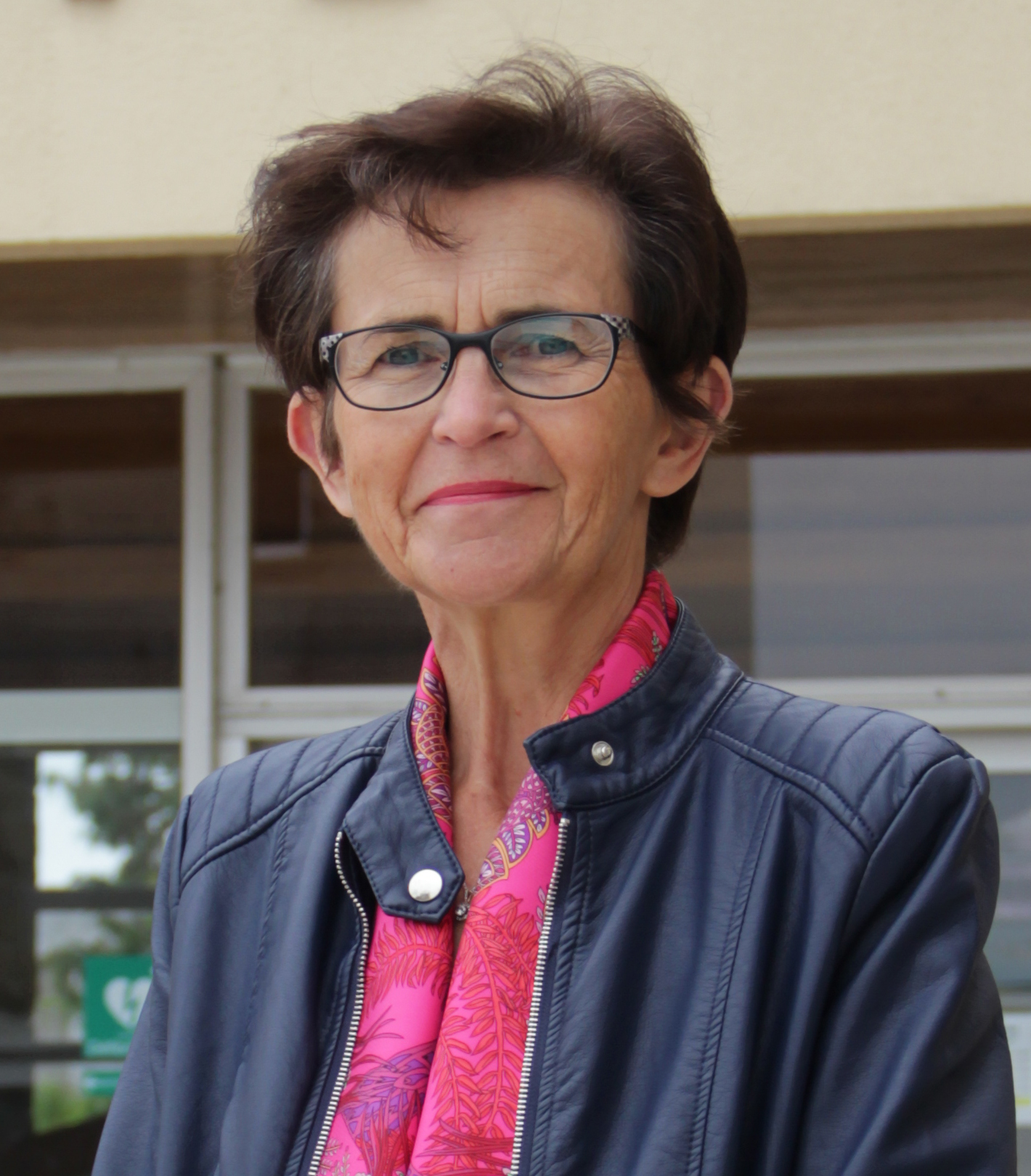
Marguerite Lamour

Marguerite Lamour (née Arzel; 12 June 1956 – 5 March 2026) was a French politician, who served as mayor of Ploudalmézeau from 2001 until her resignation in 2025. She was a member of the National Assembly of France from 2002 to 2012. She represented the Finistère department, and was a member of the Union for a Popular Movement. Lamour died on 5 March 2026, at the age of 69.

== Decorations ==
Chevalier (Knight) of the French National Order of Merit by decree of the President of the Republic of France dated 14 November 2012.
