= Jean-Claude Flory =

French politician

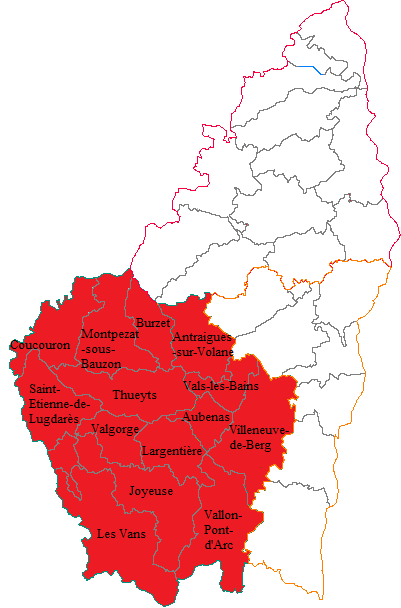
Third legislative district of Ardèche

Jean-Claude Flory (born 7 March 1966 in Valence, Drôme) was a member of the National Assembly of France. He represented the third legislative district of the Ardèche department from 2002 to 2012 as a member of the Union for a Popular Movement.
