= Yves Bur =

French politician

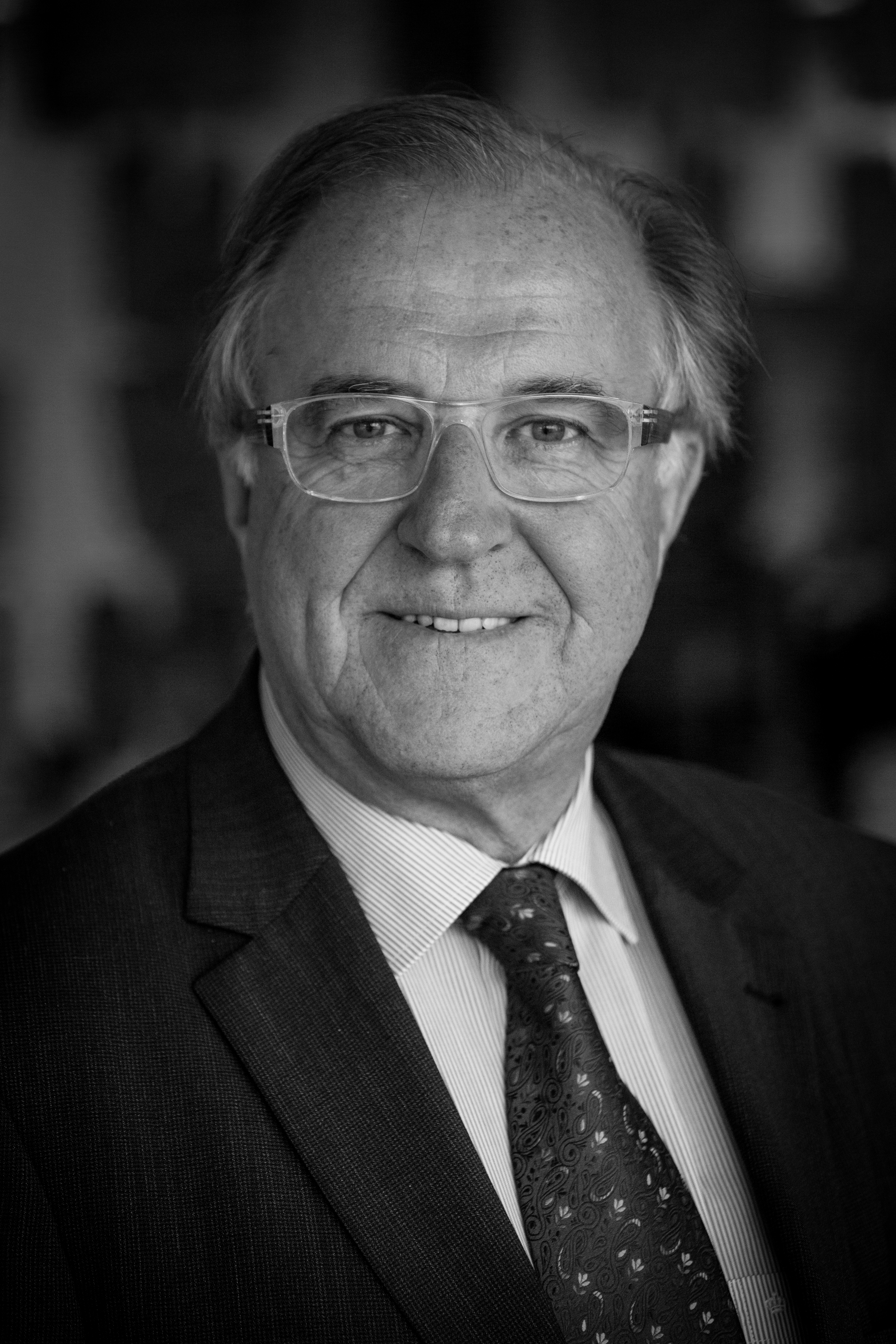
Yves Bur, 2014.

Yves Bur (born 10 March 1951 in Strasbourg) is a former member of the National Assembly of France. He has been elected in the 4th constituency of the Bas-Rhin department and is a member of the Union for a Popular Movement.
