= Jean-Marie Rolland =

French politician

Jean-Marie Rolland (born 25 September 1950 in Algiers) is a member of the National Assembly of France. He represents the Yonne department, and is a member of the Union for a Popular Movement.
