= Max Roustan =

French politician

Max Roustan (born 29 September 1944 in Saint-Julien-les-Rosiers, Gard) is a member of the National Assembly of France. He represents the Gard department, and is a member of the Union for a Popular Movement.
