= List of deputies of the 16th National Assembly of France =

This is a list of deputies of the 16th National Assembly of France under the Fifth Republic. They were elected in the 2022 legislative election and subsequent by-elections.

== Parliamentary groups ==
Composition of the National Assembly as of 28 June 2022

Composition of the National Assembly as of 18 June 2023
| Parliamentary group | | Members | Related | Total | President |
|---|---|---|---|---|---|
| RE | Renaissance | 162 | 9 | 171 | Aurore Bergé |
| RN | National Rally | 87 | 1 | 88 | Marine Le Pen |
| LFI | La France Insoumise - NUPES | 75 | 0 | 75 | Mathilde Panot |
| LR | The Republicans | 59 | 3 | 62 | Olivier Marleix |
| DEM | Democratic group, MoDem and Independents | 51 | 0 | 51 | Jean-Paul Mattei |
| HOR | Horizons and affiliated | 27 | 4 | 31 | Laurent Marcangeli |
| SOC | Socialists and affiliated - NUPES | 26 | 3 | 29 | Boris Vallaud |
| ECO | Ecologist - NUPES | 23 | 0 | 23 | Julien Bayou |
| GDR | Democratic and Republican Left - NUPES | 22 | 0 | 22 | André Chassaigne |
| LIOT | Liberties, Independents, Overseas, and Territories | 21 | 0 | 21 | Bertrand Pancher |
| NI | Non-Attached Members | – | – | 4 | – |

== List ==
| Constituency | Name | Coalition | Party | Year of birth |
| Constituency | Name | Coalition | Elected | Year of birth |
|---|---|---|---|---|
| Ain's 1st constituency | Xavier Breton | UDC | LR | 1962 |
| Ain's 2nd constituency | Romain Daubié | Ensemble | MoDem | 1980 |
| Ain's 3rd constituency | Olga Givernet | Ensemble | LREM | 1981 |
| Ain's 4th constituency | Jérôme Buisson | — | RN | 1973 |
| Ain's 5th constituency | Damien Abad | Ensemble | DVD | 1980 |
| Aisne's 1st constituency | Nicolas Dragon | — | RN | 1977 |
| Aisne's 2nd constituency | Julien Dive | UDC | LR | 1985 |
| Aisne's 3rd constituency | Jean-Louis Bricout | NUPES | PS | 1957 |
| Aisne's 4th constituency | José Beaurain | — | RN | 1971 |
| Aisne's 5th constituency | Jocelyn Dessigny | — | RN | 1981 |
| Allier's 1st constituency | Yannick Monnet | NUPES | PCF | 1975 |
| Allier's 2nd constituency | Jorys Bovet | — | RN | 1993 |
| Allier's 3rd constituency | Nicolas Ray | UDC | LR | 1981 |
| Alpes de Haute Provence's 1st constituency | Christian Girard | — | RN | 1952 |
| Alpes de Haute Provence's 2nd constituency | Léo Walter | NUPES | LFI | 1972 |
| Hautes-Alpes's 1st constituency | Pascale Boyer | Ensemble | LREM | 1965 |
| Hautes-Alpes's 2nd constituency | Joël Giraud | Ensemble | PR/LREM | 1959 |
| Alpes Maritimes's 1st constituency | Éric Ciotti | UDC | LR | 1965 |
| Alpes Maritimes's 2nd constituency | Lionel Tivoli | — | RN | 1988 |
| Alpes Maritimes's 3rd constituency | Philippe Pradal | Ensemble | H | 1963 |
| Alpes Maritimes's 4th constituency | Alexandra Masson | — | RN | 1971 |
| Alpes Maritimes's 5th constituency | Christelle d’Intorni | UDC | LR | 1985 |
| Alpes Maritimes's 6th constituency | Bryan Masson | — | RN | 1985 |
| Alpes Maritimes's 7th constituency | Éric Pauget | UDC | LR | 1970 |
| Alpes Maritimes's 8th constituency | Alexandra Martin | UDC | LR | 1968 |
| Alpes Maritimes's 9th constituency | Michèle Tabarot | UDC | LR | 1962 |
| Ardèche's 1st constituency | Hervé Saulignac | NUPES | PS | 1970 |
| Ardèche's 2nd constituency | Olivier Dussopt | Ensemble | TDP | 1978 |
| Ardèche's 3rd constituency | Fabrice Brun | UDC | LR | 1968 |
| Ardennes's 1st constituency | Lionel Vuibert | Ensemble | Agir | 1968 |
| Ardennes's 2nd constituency | Pierre Cordier | UDC | LR | 1972 |
| Ardennes's 3rd constituency | Jean-Luc Warsmann | UDC | UDI | 1965 |
| Ariège's 1st constituency | Bénédicte Taurine | NUPES | LFI | 1976 |
| Ariège's 2nd constituency | Laurent Panifous | — | DVG | 1976 |
| Aube's 1st constituency | Jordan Guitton | — | RN | 1995 |
| Aube's 2nd constituency | Valérie Bazin-Malgras | UDC | LR | 1969 |
| Aube's 3rd constituency | Angélique Ranc | — | RN | 1988 |
| Aude's 1st constituency | Christophe Barthès | — | RN | 1966 |
| Aude's 2nd constituency | Frédéric Falcon | — | RN | 1985 |
| Aude's 3rd constituency | Julien Rancoule | — | RN | 1993 |
| Aveyron's 1st constituency | Stéphane Mazars | Ensemble | LREM | 1969 |
| Aveyron's 2nd constituency | Laurent Alexandre | NUPES | LFI | 1973 |
| Aveyron's 3rd constituency | Jean-François Rousset | Ensemble | LREM | 1952 |
| Bouches du Rhône's 1st constituency | Sabrina Agresti-Roubache | Ensemble | LREM | 1976 |
| Bouches du Rhône's 2nd constituency | Claire Pitollat | Ensemble | TDP | 1979 |
| Bouches du Rhône's 3rd constituency | Gisèle Lelouis | — | RN | 1952 |
| Bouches du Rhône's 4th constituency | Manuel Bompard | NUPES | LFI | 1986 |
| Bouches du Rhône's 5th constituency | Hendrik Davi | NUPES | LFI | 1977 |
| Bouches du Rhône's 6th constituency | Lionel Royer-Perreaut | Ensemble | DVD | 1972 |
| Bouches du Rhône's 7th constituency | Sébastien Delogu | NUPES | LFI | 1987 |
| Bouches du Rhône's 8th constituency | Jean-Marc Zulesi | Ensemble | LREM | 1988 |
| Bouches du Rhône's 9th constituency | Joëlle Mélin | — | RN | 1950 |
| Bouches du Rhône's 10th constituency | José Gonzalez | — | RN | 1943 |
| Bouches du Rhône's 11th constituency | Mohamed Laqhila | Ensemble | MoDem | 1959 |
| Bouches du Rhône's 12th constituency | Franck Allisio | — | RN | 1980 |
| Bouches du Rhône's 13th constituency | Pierre Dharréville | NUPES | PCF | 1975 |
| Bouches du Rhône's 14th constituency | Anne-Laurence Petel | Ensemble | LREM | 1970 |
| Bouches du Rhône's 15th constituency | Romain Baubry | — | RN | 1989 |
| Bouches du Rhône's 16th constituency | Emmanuel Taché | — | RN | 1975 |
| Calvados's 1st constituency | Fabrice Le Vigoureux | Ensemble | LREM | 1969 |
| Calvados's 2nd constituency | Arthur Delaporte | NUPES | PS | 1991 |
| Calvados's 3rd constituency | Jérémie Patrier-Leitus | Ensemble | H | 1989 |
| Calvados's 4th constituency | Christophe Blanchet | Ensemble | LREM | 1973 |
| Calvados's 5th constituency | Bertrand Bouyx | Ensemble | LREM | 1970 |
| Calvados's 6th constituency | Élisabeth Borne | Ensemble | LREM | 1961 |
| Cantal's 1st constituency | Vincent Descœur | UDC | LR | 1962 |
| Cantal's 2nd constituency | Jean-Yves Bony | UDC | LR | 1955 |
| Charente's 1st constituency | René Pilato | NUPES | LFI | 1962 |
| Charente's 2nd constituency | Sandra Marsaud | Ensemble | TDP | 1974 |
| Charente's 3rd constituency | Caroline Colombier | — | RN | 1957 |
| Charente-Maritime's 1st constituency | Olivier Falorni | — | PRG | 1972 |
| Charente-Maritime's 2nd constituency | Anne-Laure Babault | Ensemble | LREM | 1982 |
| Charente-Maritime's 3rd constituency | Jean-Philippe Ardouin | Ensemble | LREM | 1964 |
| Charente-Maritime's 4th constituency | Raphaël Gérard | Ensemble | LREM | 1968 |
| Charente-Maritime's 5th constituency | Christophe Plassard | Ensemble | H | 1967 |
| Cher's 1st constituency | François Cormier-Bouligeon | Ensemble | LREM | 1972 |
| Cher's 2nd constituency | Nicolas Sansu | NUPES | PCF | 1968 |
| Cher's 3rd constituency | Loïc Kervran | Ensemble | H | 1984 |
| Corrèze's 1st constituency | Francis Dubois | UDC | DVD | 1961 |
| Corrèze's 2nd constituency | Frédérique Meunier | UDC | LR | 1960 |
| Corse-du-Sud's 1st constituency | Laurent Marcangeli | Ensemble | H | 1980 |
| Corse-du-Sud's 2nd constituency | Paul-André Colombani | RPS | PNC | 1967 |
| Haute-Corse's 1st constituency | Michel Castellani | RPS | FaC | 1945 |
| Haute-Corse's 2nd constituency | Jean-Félix Acquaviva | RPS | FaC | 1973 |
| Côte-d'Or's 1st constituency | Didier Martin | Ensemble | LREM | 1956 |
| Côte-d'Or's 2nd constituency | Benoît Bordat | Ensemble | FP/LREM | 1984 |
| Côte-d'Or's 3rd constituency | Fadila Khattabi | Ensemble | LREM | 1962 |
| Côte-d'Or's 4th constituency | Hubert Brigand | UDC | LR | 1952 |
| Côte-d'Or's 5th constituency | Didier Paris | Ensemble | LREM | 1954 |
| Côtes-d'Armor's 1st constituency | Mickaël Cosson | Ensemble | MoDem | 1975 |
| Côtes-d'Armor's 2nd constituency | Hervé Berville | Ensemble | LREM | 1990 |
| Côtes-d'Armor's 3rd constituency | Marc Le Fur | UDC | LR | 1956 |
| Côtes-d'Armor's 4th constituency | Murielle Lepvraud | NUPES | LFI | 1974 |
| Côtes-d'Armor's 5th constituency | Éric Bothorel | Ensemble | LREM | 1966 |
| Creuse's constituency | Catherine Couturier | NUPES | LFI | 1959 |
| Dordogne's 1st constituency | Pascale Martin | NUPES | LFI | 1961 |
| Dordogne's 2nd constituency | Serge Muller | — | RN | 1976 |
| Dordogne's 3rd constituency | Jean-Pierre Cubertafon | Ensemble | MoDem | 1948 |
| Dordogne's 4th constituency | Sébastien Peytavie | NUPES | G.s | 1982 |
| Doubs's 1st constituency | Laurent Croizier | Ensemble | MoDem | 1975 |
| Doubs's 2nd constituency | Éric Alauzet | Ensemble | TDP | 1958 |
| Doubs's 3rd constituency | Nicolas Pacquot | Ensemble | LREM | 1978 |
| Doubs's 4th constituency | Géraldine Grangier | — | RN | 1975 |
| Doubs's 5th constituency | Annie Genevard | UDC | LR | 1956 |
| Drôme's 1st constituency | Mireille Clapot | Ensemble | LREM | 1963 |
| Drôme's 2nd constituency | Lisette Pollet | — | RN | 1968 |
| Drôme's 3rd constituency | Marie Pochon | NUPES | EELV | 1990 |
| Drôme's 4th constituency | Emmanuelle Anthoine | UDC | LR | 1964 |
| Eure's 1st constituency | Christine Loir | — | RN | 1977 |
| Eure's 2nd constituency | Katiana Levavasseur | — | RN | 1970 |
| Eure's 3rd constituency | Kévin Mauvieux | — | RN | 1991 |
| Eure's 4th constituency | Philippe Brun | NUPES | PS | 1991 |
| Eure's 5th constituency | Timothée Houssin | — | RN | 1988 |
| Eure-et-Loir's 1st constituency | Guillaume Kasbarian | Ensemble | LREM | 1987 |
| Eure-et-Loir's 2nd constituency | Olivier Marleix | UDC | LR | 1971 |
| Eure-et-Loir's 3rd constituency | Luc Lamirault | Ensemble | H | 1962 |
| Eure-et-Loir's 4th constituency | Philippe Vigier | Ensemble | MoDem | 1958 |
| Finistère's 1st constituency | Annaïg Le Meur | Ensemble | LREM | 1973 |
| Finistère's 2nd constituency | Jean-Charles Larsonneur | — | DVC | 1984 |
| Finistère's 3rd constituency | Didier Le Gac | Ensemble | TDP | 1965 |
| Finistère's 4th constituency | Sandrine Le Feur | Ensemble | LREM | 1991 |
| Finistère's 5th constituency | Graziella Melchior | Ensemble | LREM | 1960 |
| Finistère's 6th constituency | Mélanie Thomin | NUPES | PS | 1984 |
| Finistère's 7th constituency | Liliane Tanguy | Ensemble | LREM | 1967 |
| Finistère's 8th constituency | Erwan Balanant | Ensemble | MoDem | 1971 |
| Gard's 1st constituency | Yoann Gillet | — | RN | 1986 |
| Gard's 2nd constituency | Nicolas Meizonnet | — | RN | 1983 |
| Gard's 3rd constituency | Pascale Bordes | — | RN | 1961 |
| Gard's 4th constituency | Pierre Meurin | — | RN | 1989 |
| Gard's 5th constituency | Michel Sala | NUPES | LFI | 1954 |
| Gard's 6th constituency | Philippe Berta | Ensemble | MoDem | 1960 |
| Haute-Garonne's 1st constituency | Hadrien Clouet | NUPES | LFI | 1991 |
| Haute-Garonne's 2nd constituency | Anne Stambach-Terrenoir | NUPES | LFI | 1980 |
| Haute-Garonne's 3rd constituency | Corinne Vignon | Ensemble | LREM | 1963 |
| Haute-Garonne's 4th constituency | François Piquemal | NUPES | LFI | 1984 |
| Haute-Garonne's 5th constituency | Jean-François Portarrieu | Ensemble | LREM | 1965 |
| Haute-Garonne's 6th constituency | Monique Iborra | Ensemble | LREM | 1945 |
| Haute-Garonne's 7th constituency | Christophe Bex | NUPES | LFI | 1961 |
| Haute-Garonne's 8th constituency | Joël Aviragnet | NUPES | PS | 1956 |
| Haute-Garonne's 9th constituency | Christine Arrighi | NUPES | EELV | 1959 |
| Haute-Garonne's 10th constituency | Dominique Faure | Ensemble | PR | 1959 |
| Gers's 1st constituency | Jean-René Cazeneuve | Ensemble | LREM | 1958 |
| Gers's 2nd constituency | David Taupiac | — | DVG | 1958 |
| Gironde's 1st constituency | Thomas Cazenave | Ensemble | LREM | 1978 |
| Gironde's 2nd constituency | Nicolas Thierry | NUPES | EELV | 1975 |
| Gironde's 3rd constituency | Loïc Prud'homme | NUPES | LFI | 1969 |
| Gironde's 4th constituency | Alain David | NUPES | PS | 1949 |
| Gironde's 5th constituency | Grégoire De Fournas | — | RN | 1985 |
| Gironde's 6th constituency | Éric Poulliat | Ensemble | LREM | 1974 |
| Gironde's 7th constituency | Bérangère Couillard | Ensemble | LREM | 1986 |
| Gironde's 8th constituency | Sophie Panonacle | Ensemble | LREM | 1968 |
| Gironde's 9th constituency | Sophie Mette | Ensemble | MoDem | 1959 |
| Gironde's 10th constituency | Florent Boudié | Ensemble | LREM | 1973 |
| Gironde's 11th constituency | Edwige Diaz | — | RN | 1987 |
| Gironde's 12th constituency | Pascal Lavergne | Ensemble | LREM | 1967 |
| Hérault's 1st constituency | Patricia Mirallès | Ensemble | TDP | 1967 |
| Hérault's 2nd constituency | Nathalie Oziol | NUPES | LFI | 1990 |
| Hérault's 3rd constituency | Laurence Cristol | Ensemble | LREM | 1967 |
| Hérault's 4th constituency | Sébastien Rome | NUPES | LFI | 1978 |
| Hérault's 5th constituency | Stéphanie Galzy | — | RN | 1981 |
| Hérault's 6th constituency | Emmanuelle Ménard | — | DVD | 1968 |
| Hérault's 7th constituency | Aurélien Lopez-Liguori | — | RN | 1993 |
| Hérault's 8th constituency | Sylvain Carrière | NUPES | LFI | 1991 |
| Hérault's 9th constituency | Patrick Vignal | Ensemble | LREM | 1958 |
| Ille-et-Vilaine's 1st constituency | Frédéric Mathieu | NUPES | LFI | 1977 |
| Ille-et-Vilaine's 2nd constituency | Laurence Maillart-Méhaignerie | Ensemble | LREM | 1967 |
| Ille-et-Vilaine's 3rd constituency | Claudia Rouaux | NUPES | PS | 1963 |
| Ille-et-Vilaine's 4th constituency | Mathilde Hignet | NUPES | LFI | 1993 |
| Ille-et-Vilaine's 5th constituency | Christine Cloarec | Ensemble | LREM | 1964 |
| Ille-et-Vilaine's 6th constituency | Thierry Benoit | Ensemble | LREM | 1966 |
| Ille-et-Vilaine's 7th constituency | Jean-Luc Bourgeaux | UDC | LR | 1963 |
| Ille-et-Vilaine's 8th constituency | Mickaël Bouloux | NUPES | PS | 1972 |
| Indre's 1st constituency | François Jolivet | Ensemble | H | 1966 |
| Indre's 2nd constituency | Nicolas Forissier | UDC | LR | 1961 |
| Indre-et-Loire's 1st constituency | Charles Fournier | NUPES | EELV | 1968 |
| Indre-et-Loire's 2nd constituency | Daniel Labaronne | Ensemble | LREM | 1955 |
| Indre-et-Loire's 3rd constituency | Henri Alfandari | Ensemble | H | 1979 |
| Indre-et-Loire's 4th constituency | Fabienne Colboc | Ensemble | LREM | 1971 |
| Indre-et-Loire's 5th constituency | Sabine Thillaye | Ensemble | MoDem | 1959 |
| Isère's 1st constituency | Olivier Véran | Ensemble | LREM | 1980 |
| Isère's 2nd constituency | Cyrielle Chatelain | NUPES | EELV | 1987 |
| Isère's 3rd constituency | Élisa Martin | NUPES | LFI | 1972 |
| Isère's 4th constituency | Marie-Noëlle Battistel | NUPES | PS | 1956 |
| Isère's 5th constituency | Jérémie Iordanoff | NUPES | EELV | 1983 |
| Isère's 6th constituency | Alexis Jolly | — | RN | 1990 |
| Isère's 7th constituency | Yannick Neuder | UDC | LR | 1969 |
| Isère's 8th constituency | Caroline Abadie | Ensemble | LREM | 1976 |
| Isère's 9th constituency | Élodie Jacquier-Laforge | Ensemble | MoDem | 1978 |
| Isère's 10th constituency | Marjolaine Meynier-Millefert | Ensemble | TDP | 1982 |
| Jura's 1st constituency | Danielle Brulebois | Ensemble | LREM | 1947 |
| Jura's 2nd constituency | Marie-Christine Dalloz | UDC | LR | 1958 |
| Jura's 3rd constituency | Justine Gruet | UDC | LR | 1989 |
| Landes's 1st constituency | Geneviève Darrieussecq | Ensemble | MoDem | 1956 |
| Landes's 2nd constituency | Lionel Causse | Ensemble | TDP/LREM | 1971 |
| Landes's 3rd constituency | Boris Vallaud | NUPES | PS | 1975 |
| Loir-et-Cher's 1st constituency | Marc Fesneau | Ensemble | MoDem | 1971 |
| Loir-et-Cher's 2nd constituency | Roger Chudeau | — | RN | 1949 |
| Loir-et-Cher's 3rd constituency | Christophe Marion | Ensemble | LREM | 1973 |
| Loire's 1st constituency | Quentin Bataillon | Ensemble | LREM | 1993 |
| Loire's 2nd constituency | Andrée Taurinya | NUPES | LFI | 1963 |
| Loire's 3rd constituency | Emmanuel Mandon | Ensemble | LREM | 1965 |
| Loire's 4th constituency | Dino Cinieri | UDC | LR | 1955 |
| Loire's 5th constituency | Antoine Vermorel-Marques | UDC | LR | 1993 |
| Loire's 6th constituency | Jean-Pierre Taite | UDC | LR | 1962 |
| Haute-Loire's 1st constituency | Isabelle Valentin | UDC | LR | 1962 |
| Haute-Loire's 2nd constituency | Jean-Pierre Vigier | UDC | LR | 1969 |
| Loire-Atlantique's 1st constituency | Mounir Belhamiti | Ensemble | LREM | 1985 |
| Loire-Atlantique's 2nd constituency | Andy Kerbrat | NUPES | LFI | 1990 |
| Loire-Atlantique's 3rd constituency | Ségolène Amiot | NUPES | LFI | 1986 |
| Loire-Atlantique's 4th constituency | Julie Laernoes | NUPES | EELV | 1982 |
| Loire-Atlantique's 5th constituency | Sarah El Haïry | Ensemble | MoDem | 1989 |
| Loire-Atlantique's 6th constituency | Jean-Claude Raux | NUPES | EELV | 1967 |
| Loire-Atlantique's 7th constituency | Sandrine Josso | Ensemble | MoDem | 1975 |
| Loire-Atlantique's 8th constituency | Matthias Tavel | NUPES | LFI | 1987 |
| Loire-Atlantique's 9th constituency | Yannick Haury | Ensemble | LREM | 1954 |
| Loire-Atlantique's 10th constituency | Sophie Errante | Ensemble | LREM | 1971 |
| Loiret's 1st constituency | Stéphanie Rist | Ensemble | LREM | 1973 |
| Loiret's 2nd constituency | Caroline Janvier | Ensemble | LREM | 1982 |
| Loiret's 3rd constituency | Mathilde Paris | — | RN | 1985 |
| Loiret's 4th constituency | Thomas Ménagé | — | RN | 1992 |
| Loiret's 5th constituency | Anthony Brosse | Ensemble | LREM | 1980 |
| Loiret's 6th constituency | Richard Ramos | Ensemble | MoDem | 1968 |
| Lot's 1st constituency | Aurélien Pradié | UDC | LR | 1986 |
| Lot's 2nd constituency | Huguette Tiegna | Ensemble | LREM | 1982 |
| Lot-et-Garonne's 1st constituency | Michel Lauzzana | Ensemble | LREM | 1957 |
| Lot-et-Garonne's 2nd constituency | Hélène Laporte | — | RN | 1978 |
| Lot-et-Garonne's 3rd constituency | Annick Cousin | — | RN | 1973 |
| Lozère's constituency | Pierre Morel-À-L'Huissier | UDC | LR | 1958 |
| Maine-et-Loire's 1st constituency | François Gernigon | Ensemble | H | 1961 |
| Maine-et-Loire's 2nd constituency | Stella Dupont | Ensemble | LREM | 1973 |
| Maine-et-Loire's 3rd constituency | Anne-Laure Blin | UDC | LR | 1983 |
| Maine-et-Loire's 4th constituency | Laëtitia Saint-Paul | Ensemble | LREM | 1981 |
| Maine-et-Loire's 5th constituency | Denis Masséglia | Ensemble | LREM | 1981 |
| Maine-et-Loire's 6th constituency | Nicole Dubré-Chirat | Ensemble | LREM | 1951 |
| Maine-et-Loire's 7th constituency | Philippe Bolo | Ensemble | MoDem | 1967 |
| Manche's 1st constituency | Philippe Gosselin | UDC | LR | 1966 |
| Manche's 2nd constituency | Bertrand Sorre | Ensemble | LREM | 1965 |
| Manche's 3rd constituency | Stéphane Travert | Ensemble | TDP | 1969 |
| Manche's 4th constituency | Anna Pic | NUPES | PS | 1978 |
| Marne's 1st constituency | Xavier Albertini | Ensemble | LREM | 1970 |
| Marne's 2nd constituency | Anne-Sophie Frigout | — | RN | 1991 |
| Marne's 3rd constituency | Éric Girardin | Ensemble | LREM | 1962 |
| Marne's 4th constituency | Lise Magnier | Ensemble | H | 1984 |
| Marne's 5th constituency | Charles de Courson | UDC | LC | 1954 |
| Haute-Marne's 1st constituency | Christophe Bentz | — | RN | 1987 |
| Haute-Marne's 2nd constituency | Laurence Robert-Dehault | — | RN | 1964 |
| Mayenne's 1st constituency | Guillaume Garot | NUPES | PS | 1966 |
| Mayenne's 2nd constituency | Géraldine Bannier | Ensemble | MoDem | 1979 |
| Mayenne's 3rd constituency | Yannick Favennec | Ensemble | H | 1958 |
| Meurthe-et-Moselle's 1st constituency | Carole Grandjean | Ensemble | LREM | 1983 |
| Meurthe-et-Moselle's 2nd constituency | Emmanuel Lacresse | Ensemble | LREM | 1971 |
| Meurthe-et-Moselle's 3rd constituency | Martine Etienne | NUPES | LFI | 1956 |
| Meurthe-et-Moselle's 4th constituency | Thibault Bazin | UDC | LR | 1984 |
| Meurthe-et-Moselle's 5th constituency | Dominique Potier | NUPES | PS | 1964 |
| Meurthe-et-Moselle's 6th constituency | Caroline Fiat | NUPES | LFI | 1977 |
| Meuse's 1st constituency | Bertrand Pancher | — | DVD | 1958 |
| Meuse's 2nd constituency | Florence Goulet | — | RN | 1961 |
| Morbihan's 1st constituency | Anne Le Hénanff | Ensemble | H | 1969 |
| Morbihan's 2nd constituency | Jimmy Pahun | Ensemble | MoDem | 1962 |
| Morbihan's 3rd constituency | Nicole Le Peih | Ensemble | TDP | 1959 |
| Morbihan's 4th constituency | Paul Molac | RPS | DVG | 1962 |
| Morbihan's 5th constituency | Lysiane Métayer | Ensemble | LREM | 1963 |
| Morbihan's 6th constituency | Jean-Michel Jacques | Ensemble | LREM | 1968 |
| Moselle's 1st constituency | Belkhir Belhaddad | Ensemble | TDP | 1969 |
| Moselle's 2nd constituency | Ludovic Mendes | Ensemble | LREM | 1987 |
| Moselle's 3rd constituency | Charlotte Leduc | NUPES | LFI | 1980 |
| Moselle's 4th constituency | Fabien Di Filippo | UDC | LR | 1986 |
| Moselle's 5th constituency | Vincent Seitlinger | UDC | LR | 1987 |
| Moselle's 6th constituency | Kévin Pfeffer | — | RN | 1990 |
| Moselle's 7th constituency | Alexandre Loubet | — | RN | 1994 |
| Moselle's 8th constituency | Laurent Jacobelli | — | RN | 1969 |
| Moselle's 9th constituency | Isabelle Rauch | Ensemble | LREM | 1968 |
| Nièvre's 1st constituency | Perrine Goulet | Ensemble | MoDem | 1978 |
| Nièvre's 2nd constituency | Patrice Perrot | Ensemble | TDP | 1964 |
| Nord's 1st constituency | Adrien Quatennens | NUPES | LFI | 1990 |
| Nord's 2nd constituency | Ugo Bernalicis | NUPES | LFI | 1989 |
| Nord's 3rd constituency | Benjamin Saint-Huile | — | DVG | 1983 |
| Nord's 4th constituency | Brigitte Liso | Ensemble | LREM | 1959 |
| Nord's 5th constituency | Victor Catteau | — | RN | 1995 |
| Nord's 6th constituency | Charlotte Lecocq | Ensemble | LREM | 1977 |
| Nord's 7th constituency | Félicie Gérard | Ensemble | H | 1974 |
| Nord's 8th constituency | David Guiraud | NUPES | LFI | 1992 |
| Nord's 9th constituency | Violette Spillebout | Ensemble | LREM | 1972 |
| Nord's 10th constituency | Gérald Darmanin | Ensemble | LREM | 1982 |
| Nord's 11th constituency | Roger Vicot | NUPES | PS | 1963 |
| Nord's 12th constituency | Michaël Taverne | — | RN | 1979 |
| Nord's 13th constituency | Christine Decodts | Ensemble | DVC | 1966 |
| Nord's 14th constituency | Paul Christophe | Ensemble | Agir | 1971 |
| Nord's 15th constituency | Pierrick Berteloot | — | RN | 1999 |
| Nord's 16th constituency | Matthieu Marchio | — | RN | 1993 |
| Nord's 17th constituency | Thibaut François | — | RN | 1989 |
| Nord's 18th constituency | Guy Bricout | UDC | UDI | 1944 |
| Nord's 19th constituency | Sébastien Chenu | — | RN | 1973 |
| Nord's 20th constituency | Fabien Roussel | NUPES | PCF | 1969 |
| Nord's 21st constituency | Béatrice Descamps | UDC | UDI | 1961 |
| Oise's 1st constituency | Victor Habert-Dassault | UDC | LR | 1992 |
| Oise's 2nd constituency | Philippe Ballard | — | RN | 1960 |
| Oise's 3rd constituency | Alexandre Sabatou | — | RN | 1993 |
| Oise's 4th constituency | Éric Woerth | Ensemble | DVD | 1956 |
| Oise's 5th constituency | Pierre Vatin | UDC | LR | 1967 |
| Oise's 6th constituency | Michel Guiniot | — | RN | 1954 |
| Oise's 7th constituency | Maxime Minot | UDC | LR | 1987 |
| Orne's 1st constituency | Chantal Jourdan | NUPES | PS | 1958 |
| Orne's 2nd constituency | Véronique Louwagie | UDC | LR | 1961 |
| Orne's 3rd constituency | Jérôme Nury | UDC | LR | 1972 |
| Pas-de-Calais's 1st constituency | Emmanuel Blairy | — | RN | 1986 |
| Pas-de-Calais's 2nd constituency | Jacqueline Maquet | Ensemble | LREM | 1949 |
| Pas-de-Calais's 3rd constituency | Jean-Marc Tellier | NUPES | PCF | 1969 |
| Pas-de-Calais's 4th constituency | Philippe Fait | Ensemble | LREM | 1969 |
| Pas-de-Calais's 5th constituency | Jean-Pierre Pont | Ensemble | LREM | 1950 |
| Pas-de-Calais's 6th constituency | Christine Engrand | — | RN | 1955 |
| Pas-de-Calais's 7th constituency | Pierre-Henri Dumont | UDC | LR | 1987 |
| Pas-de-Calais's 8th constituency | Bertrand Petit | — | DVG | 1964 |
| Pas-de-Calais's 9th constituency | Caroline Parmentier | — | RN | 1965 |
| Pas-de-Calais's 10th constituency | Thierry Frappé | — | RN | 1952 |
| Pas-de-Calais's 11th constituency | Marine Le Pen | — | RN | 1968 |
| Pas-de-Calais's 12th constituency | Bruno Bilde | — | RN | 1976 |
| Puy-de-Dôme's 1st constituency | Marianne Maximi | NUPES | LFI | 1985 |
| Puy-de-Dôme's 2nd constituency | Christine Pirès-Beaune | NUPES | PS | 1964 |
| Puy-de-Dôme's 3rd constituency | Laurence Vichnievsky | Ensemble | MoDem | 1955 |
| Puy-de-Dôme's 4th constituency | Delphine Lingemann | Ensemble | MoDem | 1972 |
| Puy-de-Dôme's 5th constituency | André Chassaigne | NUPES | PCF | 1950 |
| Pyrénées-Atlantiques's 1st constituency | Josy Poueyto | Ensemble | MoDem | 1954 |
| Pyrénées-Atlantiques's 2nd constituency | Jean-Paul Mattei | Ensemble | MoDem | 1954 |
| Pyrénées-Atlantiques's 3rd constituency | David Habib | — | DVG | 1961 |
| Pyrénées-Atlantiques's 4th constituency | Iñaki Echaniz | NUPES | PS | 1993 |
| Pyrénées-Atlantiques's 5th constituency | Florence Lasserre-David | Ensemble | MoDem | 1974 |
| Pyrénées-Atlantiques's 6th constituency | Vincent Bru | Ensemble | MoDem | 1955 |
| Hautes-Pyrénées's 1st constituency | Sylvie Ferrer | NUPES | LFI | 1967 |
| Hautes-Pyrénées's 2nd constituency | Benoit Mournet | Ensemble | LREM | 1986 |
| Pyrénées-Orientales's 1st constituency | Sophie Blanc | — | RN | 1968 |
| Pyrénées-Orientales's 2nd constituency | Anaïs Sabatini | — | RN | 1990 |
| Pyrénées-Orientales's 3rd constituency | Sandrine Dogor-Such | — | RN | 1970 |
| Pyrénées-Orientales's 4th constituency | Michèle Martinez | — | RN | 1968 |
| Bas-Rhin's 1st constituency | Sandra Regol | NUPES | EELV | 1978 |
| Bas-Rhin's 2nd constituency | Emmanuel Fernandes | NUPES | LFI | 1980 |
| Bas-Rhin's 3rd constituency | Bruno Studer | Ensemble | LREM | 1978 |
| Bas-Rhin's 4th constituency | Françoise Buffet | Ensemble | LREM | 1953 |
| Bas-Rhin's 5th constituency | Charles Sitzenstuhl | Ensemble | LREM | 1988 |
| Bas-Rhin's 6th constituency | Louise Morel | Ensemble | MoDem | 1995 |
| Bas-Rhin's 7th constituency | Patrick Hetzel | UDC | LR | 1964 |
| Bas-Rhin's 8th constituency | Stéphanie Kochert | Ensemble | H | 1975 |
| Bas-Rhin's 9th constituency | Vincent Thiébaut | Ensemble | LREM | 1972 |
| Haut-Rhin's 1st constituency | Brigitte Klinkert | Ensemble | LREM | 1956 |
| Haut-Rhin's 2nd constituency | Hubert Ott | Ensemble | MoDem | 1964 |
| Haut-Rhin's 3rd constituency | Didier Lemaire | Ensemble | H | 1975 |
| Haut-Rhin's 4th constituency | Raphaël Schellenberger | UDC | LR | 1990 |
| Haut-Rhin's 5th constituency | Olivier Becht | Ensemble | Agir | 1976 |
| Haut-Rhin's 6th constituency | Bruno Fuchs | Ensemble | MoDem | 1959 |
| Rhône's 1st constituency | Thomas Rudigoz | Ensemble | LREM | 1971 |
| Rhône's 2nd constituency | Hubert Julien-Laferrière | NUPES | GE | 1966 |
| Rhône's 3rd constituency | Marie-Charlotte Garin | NUPES | EELV | 1995 |
| Rhône's 4th constituency | Anne Brugnera | Ensemble | TDP | 1970 |
| Rhône's 5th constituency | Blandine Brocard | Ensemble | LREM | 1981 |
| Rhône's 6th constituency | Gabriel Amard | NUPES | LFI | 1967 |
| Rhône's 7th constituency | Alexandre Vincendet | UDC | LR | 1983 |
| Rhône's 8th constituency | Nathalie Serre | UDC | LR | 1968 |
| Rhône's 9th constituency | Alexandre Portier | UDC | LR | 1990 |
| Rhône's 10th constituency | Thomas Gassilloud | Ensemble | Agir | 1981 |
| Rhône's 11th constituency | Jean-Luc Fugit | Ensemble | LREM | 1969 |
| Rhône's 12th constituency | Cyrille Isaac-Sibille | Ensemble | MoDem | 1958 |
| Rhône's 13th constituency | Sarah Tanzilli | Ensemble | LREM | 1985 |
| Rhône's 14th constituency | Idir Boumertit | NUPES | LFI | 1974 |
| Haute-Saône's 1st constituency | Antoine Villedieu | — | RN | 1989 |
| Haute-Saône's 2nd constituency | Émeric Salmon | — | RN | 1973 |
| Saône-et-Loire's 1st constituency | Benjamin Dirx | Ensemble | LREM | 1979 |
| Saône-et-Loire's 2nd constituency | Josiane Corneloup | UDC | LR | 1959 |
| Saône-et-Loire's 3rd constituency | Rémy Rebeyrotte | Ensemble | TDP | 1966 |
| Saône-et-Loire's 4th constituency | Cécile Untermaier | NUPES | PS | 1951 |
| Saône-et-Loire's 5th constituency | Louis Margueritte | Ensemble | H | 1984 |
| Sarthe's 1st constituency | Julie Delpech | Ensemble | LREM | 1989 |
| Sarthe's 2nd constituency | Marietta Karamanli | NUPES | DVG | 1964 |
| Sarthe's 3rd constituency | Éric Martineau | Ensemble | MoDem | 1968 |
| Sarthe's 4th constituency | Elise Leboucher | NUPES | LFI | 1982 |
| Sarthe's 5th constituency | Jean-Carles Grelier | Ensemble | DVD | 1966 |
| Savoie's 1st constituency | Marina Ferrari | Ensemble | MoDem | 1973 |
| Savoie's 2nd constituency | Vincent Rolland | UDC | LR | 1970 |
| Savoie's 3rd constituency | Émilie Bonnivard | UDC | LR | 1980 |
| Savoie's 4th constituency | Jean-François Coulomme | NUPES | LFI | 1966 |
| Haute-Savoie's 1st constituency | Véronique Riotton | Ensemble | LREM | 1969 |
| Haute-Savoie's 2nd constituency | Antoine Armand | Ensemble | LREM | 1991 |
| Haute-Savoie's 3rd constituency | Christelle Petex-Levet | UDC | LR | 1980 |
| Haute-Savoie's 4th constituency | Virginie Duby-Muller | UDC | LR | 1979 |
| Haute-Savoie's 5th constituency | Anne-Cécile Violland | Ensemble | H | 1973 |
| Haute-Savoie's 6th constituency | Xavier Roseren | Ensemble | LREM | 1970 |
| Paris's 1st constituency | Sylvain Maillard | Ensemble | LREM | 1974 |
| Paris's 2nd constituency | Gilles Le Gendre | Ensemble | LREM | 1958 |
| Paris's 3rd constituency | Stanislas Guerini | Ensemble | LREM | 1982 |
| Paris's 4th constituency | Astrid Panosyan | Ensemble | LREM | 1971 |
| Paris's 5th constituency | Julien Bayou | NUPES | EELV | 1980 |
| Paris's 6th constituency | Sophia Chikirou | NUPES | LFI | 1979 |
| Paris's 7th constituency | Clément Beaune | Ensemble | LREM | 1981 |
| Paris's 8th constituency | Éva Sas | NUPES | EELV | 1970 |
| Paris's 9th constituency | Sandrine Rousseau | NUPES | EELV | 1972 |
| Paris's 10th constituency | Rodrigo Arenas | NUPES | LFI | 1974 |
| Paris's 11th constituency | Maud Gatel | Ensemble | MoDem | 1979 |
| Paris's 12th constituency | Olivia Grégoire | Ensemble | LREM | 1978 |
| Paris's 13th constituency | David Amiel | Ensemble | LREM | 1992 |
| Paris's 14th constituency | Benjamin Haddad | Ensemble | LREM | 1985 |
| Paris's 15th constituency | Danielle Simonnet | NUPES | LFI | 1971 |
| Paris's 16th constituency | Sarah Legrain | NUPES | LFI | 1985 |
| Paris's 17th constituency | Danièle Obono | NUPES | LFI | 1980 |
| Paris's 18th constituency | Aymeric Caron | NUPES | REV | 1971 |
| Seine-Maritime's 1st constituency | Damien Adam | Ensemble | LREM | 1989 |
| Seine-Maritime's 2nd constituency | Annie Vidal | Ensemble | LREM | 1956 |
| Seine-Maritime's 3rd constituency | Hubert Wulfranc | NUPES | PCF | 1956 |
| Seine-Maritime's 4th constituency | Alma Dufour | NUPES | LFI | 1990 |
| Seine-Maritime's 5th constituency | Gérard Leseul | NUPES | PS | 1960 |
| Seine-Maritime's 6th constituency | Sébastien Jumel | NUPES | PCF | 1971 |
| Seine-Maritime's 7th constituency | Agnès Firmin-Le Bodo | Ensemble | H | 1968 |
| Seine-Maritime's 8th constituency | Jean-Paul Lecoq | NUPES | PCF | 1958 |
| Seine-Maritime's 9th constituency | Marie-Agnès Poussier-Winsback | Ensemble | H | 1967 |
| Seine-Maritime's 10th constituency | Xavier Batut | Ensemble | LREM | 1976 |
| Seine-et-Marne's 1st constituency | Aude Luquet | Ensemble | MoDem | 1967 |
| Seine-et-Marne's 2nd constituency | Frédéric Valletoux | Ensemble | H | 1966 |
| Seine-et-Marne's 3rd constituency | Jean-Louis Thiériot | UDC | LR | 1969 |
| Seine-et-Marne's 4th constituency | Isabelle Périgault | UDC | LR | 1971 |
| Seine-et-Marne's 5th constituency | Franck Riester | Ensemble | Agir | 1974 |
| Seine-et-Marne's 6th constituency | Béatrice Roullaud | — | RN | 1960 |
| Seine-et-Marne's 7th constituency | Ersilia Soudais | NUPES | LFI | 1988 |
| Seine-et-Marne's 8th constituency | Hadrien Ghomi | Ensemble | LREM | 1989 |
| Seine-et-Marne's 9th constituency | Michèle Peyron | Ensemble | TDP | 1961 |
| Seine-et-Marne's 10th constituency | Maxime Laisney | NUPES | LFI | 1981 |
| Seine-et-Marne's 11th constituency | Olivier Faure | NUPES | PS | 1968 |
| Yvelines's 1st constituency | Charles Rodwell | Ensemble | LREM | 1996 |
| Yvelines's 2nd constituency | Jean-Noël Barrot | Ensemble | MoDem | 1983 |
| Yvelines's 3rd constituency | Béatrice Piron | Ensemble | LREM | 1965 |
| Yvelines's 4th constituency | Marie Lebec | Ensemble | LREM | 1990 |
| Yvelines's 5th constituency | Yaël Braun-Pivet | Ensemble | LREM | 1970 |
| Yvelines's 6th constituency | Natalia Pouzyreff | Ensemble | LREM | 1961 |
| Yvelines's 7th constituency | Nadia Hai | Ensemble | LREM | 1980 |
| Yvelines's 8th constituency | Benjamin Lucas | NUPES | G.s | 1990 |
| Yvelines's 9th constituency | Bruno Millienne | Ensemble | MoDem | 1959 |
| Yvelines's 10th constituency | Aurore Bergé | Ensemble | LREM | 1986 |
| Yvelines's 11th constituency | William Martinet | NUPES | LFI | 1988 |
| Yvelines's 12th constituency | Karl Olive | Ensemble | LREM | 1969 |
| Deux-Sèvres's 1st constituency | Bastien Marchive | Ensemble | PR | 1990 |
| Deux-Sèvres's 2nd constituency | Delphine Batho | NUPES | GE | 1973 |
| Deux-Sèvres's 3rd constituency | Jean-Marie Fiévet | Ensemble | LREM | 1964 |
| Somme's 1st constituency | François Ruffin | NUPES | PD | 1975 |
| Somme's 2nd constituency | Barbara Pompili | Ensemble | EC | 1964 |
| Somme's 3rd constituency | Emmanuel Maquet | UDC | LR | 1964 |
| Somme's 4th constituency | Jean-Philippe Tanguy | — | RN | 1986 |
| Somme's 5th constituency | Yaël Ménache | — | RN | 1985 |
| Tarn's 1st constituency | Frédéric Cabrolier | — | RN | 1966 |
| Tarn's 2nd constituency | Karen Erodi | NUPES | LFI | 1977 |
| Tarn's 3rd constituency | Jean Terlier | Ensemble | LREM | 1977 |
| Tarn-et-Garonne's 1st constituency | Valérie Rabault | NUPES | PS | 1973 |
| Tarn-et-Garonne's 2nd constituency | Marine Hamelet | — | RN | 1967 |
| Var's 1st constituency | Yannick Chenevard | Ensemble | LREM | 1959 |
| Var's 2nd constituency | Laure Lavalette | — | RN | 1976 |
| Var's 3rd constituency | Stéphane Rambaud | — | RN | 1960 |
| Var's 4th constituency | Philippe Lottiaux | — | RN | 1966 |
| Var's 5th constituency | Julie Lechanteux | — | RN | 1977 |
| Var's 6th constituency | Frank Giletti | — | RN | 1973 |
| Var's 7th constituency | Frédéric Boccaletti | — | RN | 1973 |
| Var's 8th constituency | Philippe Schreck | — | RN | 1972 |
| Vaucluse's 1st constituency | Joris Hébrard | — | RN | 1982 |
| Vaucluse's 2nd constituency | Bénédicte Auzanot | — | RN | 1972 |
| Vaucluse's 3rd constituency | Hervé de Lépinau | — | RN | 1969 |
| Vaucluse's 4th constituency | Marie-France Lorho | — | LS | 1964 |
| Vaucluse's 5th constituency | Jean-François Lovisolo | Ensemble | LREM | 1968 |
| Vendée's 1st constituency | Philippe Latombe | Ensemble | MoDem | 1975 |
| Vendée's 2nd constituency | Béatrice Bellamy | Ensemble | H | 1966 |
| Vendée's 3rd constituency | Stéphane Buchou | Ensemble | LREM | 1974 |
| Vendée's 4th constituency | Véronique Besse | — | DVD | 1963 |
| Vendée's 5th constituency | Pierre Henriet | Ensemble | LREM | 1991 |
| Vienne's 1st constituency | Lisa Belluco | NUPES | EELV | 1988 |
| Vienne's 2nd constituency | Sacha Houlié | Ensemble | LREM | 1988 |
| Vienne's 3rd constituency | Pascal Lecamp | Ensemble | MoDem | 1958 |
| Vienne's 4th constituency | Nicolas Turquois | Ensemble | MoDem | 1972 |
| Haute-Vienne's 1st constituency | Damien Maudet | NUPES | LFI | 1996 |
| Haute-Vienne's 2nd constituency | Stéphane Delautrette | NUPES | PS | 1972 |
| Haute-Vienne's 3rd constituency | Manon Meunier | NUPES | LFI | 1996 |
| Vosges's 1st constituency | Stéphane Viry | UDC | LR | 1969 |
| Vosges's 2nd constituency | David Valence | Ensemble | PR | 1981 |
| Vosges's 3rd constituency | Christophe Naegelen | UDC | UDI | 1983 |
| Vosges's 4th constituency | Jean-Jacques Gaultier | UDC | LR | 1963 |
| Yonne's 1st constituency | Daniel Grenon | — | RN | 1948 |
| Yonne's 2nd constituency | André Villiers | Ensemble | H | 1954 |
| Yonne's 3rd constituency | Julien Odoul | — | RN | 1985 |
| Territoire-de-Belfort's 1st constituency | Ian Boucard | UDC | LR | 1988 |
| Territoire-de-Belfort's 2nd constituency | Florian Chauche | NUPES | LFI | 1984 |
| Essonne's 1st constituency | Farida Amrani | NUPES | LFI | 1976 |
| Essonne's 2nd constituency | Nathalie Da Conceicao Carvalho | — | RN | 1966 |
| Essonne's 3rd constituency | Alexis Izard | Ensemble | LREM | 1992 |
| Essonne's 4th constituency | Marie-Pierre Rixain | Ensemble | LREM | 1977 |
| Essonne's 5th constituency | Paul Midy | Ensemble | LREM | 1983 |
| Essonne's 6th constituency | Jérôme Guedj | NUPES | PS | 1972 |
| Essonne's 7th constituency | Robin Reda | Ensemble | LREM | 1991 |
| Essonne's 8th constituency | Nicolas Dupont-Aignan | UPF | DLF | 1961 |
| Essonne's 9th constituency | Marie Guévenoux | Ensemble | LREM | 1976 |
| Essonne's 10th constituency | Antoine Léaument | NUPES | LFI | 1989 |
| Hauts-de-Seine's 1st constituency | Elsa Faucillon | NUPES | PCF | 1981 |
| Hauts-de-Seine's 2nd constituency | Francesca Pasquini | NUPES | EELV | 1981 |
| Hauts-de-Seine's 3rd constituency | Philippe Juvin | UDC | LR | 1964 |
| Hauts-de-Seine's 4th constituency | Sabrina Sebaihi | NUPES | EELV | 1981 |
| Hauts-de-Seine's 5th constituency | Céline Calvez | Ensemble | LREM | 1979 |
| Hauts-de-Seine's 6th constituency | Constance Le Grip | Ensemble | LREM | 1960 |
| Hauts-de-Seine's 7th constituency | Pierre Cazeneuve | Ensemble | LREM | 1995 |
| Hauts-de-Seine's 8th constituency | Prisca Thevenot | Ensemble | LREM | 1985 |
| Hauts-de-Seine's 9th constituency | Emmanuel Pellerin | Ensemble | LREM | 1970 |
| Hauts-de-Seine's 10th constituency | Gabriel Attal | Ensemble | LREM | 1989 |
| Hauts-de-Seine's 11th constituency | Aurélien Saintoul | NUPES | LFI | 1988 |
| Hauts-de-Seine's 12th constituency | Jean-Louis Bourlanges | Ensemble | MoDem | 1946 |
| Hauts-de-Seine's 13th constituency | Maud Bregeon | Ensemble | LREM | 1991 |
| Seine-Saint-Denis's 1st constituency | Éric Coquerel | NUPES | LFI | 1958 |
| Seine-Saint-Denis's 2nd constituency | Stéphane Peu | NUPES | PCF | 1962 |
| Seine-Saint-Denis's 3rd constituency | Thomas Portes | NUPES | LFI | 1985 |
| Seine-Saint-Denis's 4th constituency | Soumya Bourouaha | NUPES | PCF | 1964 |
| Seine-Saint-Denis's 5th constituency | Raquel Garrido | NUPES | LFI | 1974 |
| Seine-Saint-Denis's 6th constituency | Bastien Lachaud | NUPES | LFI | 1980 |
| Seine-Saint-Denis's 7th constituency | Alexis Corbière | NUPES | LFI | 1968 |
| Seine-Saint-Denis's 8th constituency | Fatiha Keloua-Hachi | NUPES | PS | 1971 |
| Seine-Saint-Denis's 9th constituency | Aurélie Trouvé | NUPES | LFI | 1979 |
| Seine-Saint-Denis's 10th constituency | Nadège Abomangoli | NUPES | LFI | 1975 |
| Seine-Saint-Denis's 11th constituency | Clémentine Autain | NUPES | LFI | 1973 |
| Seine-Saint-Denis's 12th constituency | Jérôme Legavre | NUPES | POI | 1972 |
| Val-de-Marne's 1st constituency | Frédéric Descrozaille | Ensemble | LREM | 1967 |
| Val-de-Marne's 2nd constituency | Clémence Guetté | NUPES | LFI | 1991 |
| Val-de-Marne's 3rd constituency | Louis Boyard | NUPES | LFI | 2000 |
| Val-de-Marne's 4th constituency | Maud Petit | Ensemble | MoDem | 1971 |
| Val-de-Marne's 5th constituency | Mathieu Lefèvre | Ensemble | LREM | 1986 |
| Val-de-Marne's 6th constituency | Guillaume Gouffier-Cha | Ensemble | LREM | 1986 |
| Val-de-Marne's 7th constituency | Rachel Keke | NUPES | LFI | 1974 |
| Val-de-Marne's 8th constituency | Michel Herbillon | UDC | LR | 1951 |
| Val-de-Marne's 9th constituency | Isabelle Santiago | NUPES | PS | 1965 |
| Val-de-Marne's 10th constituency | Mathilde Panot | NUPES | LFI | 1989 |
| Val-de-Marne's 11th constituency | Sophie Taillé-Polian | NUPES | G.s | 1974 |
| Val d'Oise's 1st constituency | Emilie Chandler | Ensemble | LREM | 1983 |
| Val d'Oise's 2nd constituency | Guillaume Vuilletet | Ensemble | LREM | 1967 |
| Val d'Oise's 3rd constituency | Cécile Rilhac | Ensemble | LREM | 1974 |
| Val d'Oise's 4th constituency | Naïma Moutchou | Ensemble | H | 1980 |
| Val d'Oise's 5th constituency | Paul Vannier | NUPES | LFI | 1985 |
| Val d'Oise's 6th constituency | Estelle Folest | Ensemble | MoDem | 1976 |
| Val d'Oise's 7th constituency | Dominique Da Silva | Ensemble | LREM | 1968 |
| Val d'Oise's 8th constituency | Carlos Martens Bilongo | NUPES | LFI | 1990 |
| Val d'Oise's 9th constituency | Arnaud Le Gall | NUPES | LFI | 1980 |
| Val d'Oise's 10th constituency | Aurélien Taché | NUPES | LND | 1984 |
| Guadeloupe's 1st constituency | Olivier Serva | NUPES | DVG | 1974 |
| Guadeloupe's 2nd constituency | Christian Baptiste | NUPES | PPDG | 1962 |
| Guadeloupe's 3rd constituency | Max Mathiasin | Ensemble | DVG | 1956 |
| Guadeloupe's 4th constituency | Élie Califer | NUPES | PS | 1954 |
| Martinique's 1st constituency | Jiovanny William | NUPES | DVG | 1985 |
| Martinique's 2nd constituency | Marcellin Nadeau | NUPES | Péyi-A | 1962 |
| Martinique's 3rd constituency | Johnny Hajjar | NUPES | PPM | 1973 |
| Martinique's 4th constituency | Jean-Philippe Nilor | NUPES | Péyi-A | 1965 |
| French Guiana's 1st constituency | Jean-Victor Castor | NUPES | MDES | 1962 |
| French Guiana's 2nd constituency | Davy Rimane | NUPES | DVG | 1979 |
| Réunion's 1st constituency | Philippe Naillet | NUPES | PS | 1960 |
| Réunion's 2nd constituency | Karine Lebon | NUPES | PLR | 1985 |
| Réunion's 3rd constituency | Nathalie Bassire | — | DVD | 1968 |
| Réunion's 4th constituency | Emeline K/Bidi | NUPES | LP | 1987 |
| Réunion's 5th constituency | Jean-Hugues Ratenon | NUPES | LFI | 1967 |
| Réunion's 6th constituency | Frédéric Maillot | NUPES | PLR | 1986 |
| Réunion's 7th constituency | Perceval Gaillard | NUPES | LFI | 1983 |
| Saint-Pierre-et-Miquelon's 1st constituency | Stéphane Lenormand | UDC | AD | 1964 |
| Saint-Barthélemy and Saint-Martin's 1st constituency | Frantz Gumbs | Ensemble | LREM | 1954 |
| Mayotte's 1st constituency | Estelle Youssouffa | — | DVD | 1961 |
| Mayotte's 2nd constituency | Mansour Kamardine | UDC | LR | 1959 |
| Wallis and Futuna's 1st constituency | Mikaele Seo | Ensemble | LREM | 1971 |
| French Polynesia's 1st constituency | Tematai Le Gayic | NUPES | Tavini | 2000 |
| French Polynesia's 2nd constituency | Steve Chailloux | NUPES | Tavini | 1985 |
| French Polynesia's 3rd constituency | Moetai Brotherson | NUPES | Tavini | 1969 |
| New Caledonia's 1st constituency | Philippe Dunoyer | Ensemble | CE | 1968 |
| New Caledonia's 2nd constituency | Nicolas Metzdorf | Ensemble | GNC | 1988 |
| French residents overseas' 1st constituency | Roland Lescure | Ensemble | LREM | 1968 |
| French residents overseas' 2nd constituency | Éléonore Caroit | Ensemble | LREM | 1985 |
| French residents overseas' 3rd constituency | Alexandre Holroyd | Ensemble | LREM | 1987 |
| French residents overseas' 4th constituency | Pieyre-Alexandre Anglade | Ensemble | LREM | 1986 |
| French residents overseas' 5th constituency | Stéphane Vojetta | — | DVC | 1974 |
| French residents overseas' 6th constituency | Marc Ferracci | Ensemble | LREM | 1977 |
| French residents overseas' 7th constituency | Frédéric Petit | Ensemble | MoDem | 1961 |
| French residents overseas' 8th constituency | Meyer Habib | UDC | UDI | 1961 |
| French residents overseas' 9th constituency | Karim Ben Cheïkh | NUPES | G.s | 1977 |
| French residents overseas' 10th constituency | Amal Amélia Lakrafi | Ensemble | LREM | 1978 |
| French residents overseas' 11th constituency | Anne Genetet | Ensemble | LREM | 1973 |

== Vacancies ==
The following vacancies occurred during the legislature:

| Constituency | Deputy | Party | Group | Motive | Date | Substitute |
|---|---|---|---|---|---|---|
| Hauts-de-Seine's 10th | Gabriel Attal | LREM | RE | Appointed to the Borne government | 22 July 2022 | Claire Guichard |
| Paris's 7th | Clément Beaune | TdP | RE | Appointed to the Borne government | 22 July 2022 | Clara Chassaniol |
| Calvados's 6th | Élisabeth Borne | LREM-TdP | RE | Appointed to the Borne government | 22 July 2022 | Freddy Sertin |
| Nord's 10th | Gérald Darmanin | LREM | RE | Appointed to the Borne government | 22 July 2022 | Vincent Ledoux |
| Ardèche's 2nd | Olivier Dussopt | TdP | RE | Appointed to the Borne government | 22 July 2022 | Laurence Heydel Grillere |
| Loir-et-Cher's 1st | Marc Fesneau | MoDem | MoDem | Appointed to the Borne government | 22 July 2022 | Mathilde Desjonquères |
| Paris's 12th | Olivia Grégoire | LREM | RE | Appointed to the Borne government | 22 July 2022 | Fanta Berete |
| Paris's 3rd | Stanislas Guerini | LREM | RE | Appointed to the Borne government | 22 July 2022 | Caroline Yadan |
| Seine-et-Marne's 5th | Franck Riester | Agir | RE | Appointed to the Borne government | 22 July 2022 | Patricia Lemoine |
| Isère's 1st | Olivier Véran | LREM-TdP | RE | Appointed to the Borne government | 22 July 2022 | Servane Hugues |
| Yvelines's 2nd | Jean-Noël Barrot | MoDem | MoDem | Appointed to the Borne government | 4 August 2022 | Anne Grignon |
| Haut-Rhin's 5th | Olivier Becht | Agir | RE | Appointed to the Borne government | 4 August 2022 | Charlotte Goetschy-Bolognese |
| Côtes-d'Armor's 2nd | Hervé Berville | LREM | RE | Appointed to the Borne government | 4 August 2022 | Chantal Bouloux |
| Gironde's 7th | Bérangère Couillard | LREM | RE | Appointed to the Borne government | 4 August 2022 | Frédéric Zgainski |
| Landes's 1st | Geneviève Darrieussecq | MoDem | MoDem | Appointed to the Borne government | 4 August 2022 | Fabien Lainé |
| Loire-Atlantique's 5th | Sarah El Hairy | MoDem | MoDem | Appointed to the Borne government | 4 August 2022 | Luc Geismar |
| Haute-Garonne's 10th | Dominique Faure | PRV | RE | Appointed to the Borne government | 4 August 2022 | Laurent Esquenet-Goxes |
| Seine-Maritime's 7th | Agnès Firmin-Le Bodo | Horizons | H | Appointed to the Borne government | 4 August 2022 | Agnès Carel |
| Meurthe-et-Moselle's 1st | Carole Grandjean | LREM | RE | Appointed to the Borne government | 4 August 2022 | Philippe Guillemard |
| 1st for residents overseas | Roland Lescure | LREM | RE | Appointed to the Borne government | 4 August 2022 | Christopher Weissberg |
| Hérault's 1st | Patricia Mirallès | LREM - TdP | RE | Appointed to the Borne government | 4 August 2022 | Philippe Sorez |
| Yvelines's 2nd | Anne Grignon | MoDem | MoDem | Resignation | 12 August 2022 | Jean-Noël Barrot By-election |
| Yvelines's 2nd | Jean-Noel Barrot | MoDem | MoDem | Appointed to the Borne government | 9 November 2022 | Anne Bergantz |
| Pas-de-Calais's 8th | Bertrand Petit | DVG | DVG | Election cancelled by the Constitutional Council | 2 December 2022 | Bertrand Petit By-election |
| Charente's 1st | Thomas Mesnier | Horizons | Horizons | Election cancelled by the Constitutional Council | 2 December 2022 | René Pilato By-election |
| Marne's 2nd | Anne-Sophie Frigout | RN | RN | Election cancelled by the Constitutional Council | 2 December 2022 | Laure Miller By-election |
| Ariège's 1st | Bénédicte Taurine | LFI | LFI | Election cancelled by the Constitutional Council | 27 January 2023 | Martine Froger By-election |
| 9th for residents overseas | Karim Ben Cheïkh | G.s | ECO | Election cancelled by the Constitutional Council | 15 April 2023 | Karim Ben Cheïkh By-election |
| 2nd for residents overseas | Éléonore Caroit | RE | RE | Election cancelled by the Constitutional Council | 15 April 2023 | Éléonore Caroit By-election |
| Vaucluse's 1st | Joris Hébrard | RN | RN | Resignation | 3 June 2023 | Catherine Jaouen |
| French Polynesia's 3rd | Moetai Brotherson | Tāvini Huiraʻatira | Tāvini Huiraʻatira | Elected in the 2023 French Polynesian legislative election | 9 June 2023 | Mereana Reid Arbelot |
| Gironde's 1st | Thomas Cazenave | RE | RE | Joined the Borne government | 21 July 2023 | Alexandra Martin |
| Côte-d'Or's 3rd | Fadila Khattabi | RE | RE | Joined the Borne government | 21 July 2023 | Philippe Frei |
| Bouches-du-Rhône's 1st | Sabrina Agresti-Roubache | RE | RE | Joined the Borne government | 21 July 2023 | Didier Parakian |
| Hauts-de-Seine's 8th | Prisca Thévenot | RE | RE | Joined the Borne government | 21 July 2023 | Virginie Lanlo |
| Eure-et-Loir's 4th | Philippe Vigier | RE | RE | Joined the Borne government | 21 July 2023 | Laurent Leclercq |
| Somme's 2nd | Barbara Pompili | Ecologist Party | RE | Extension of temporary mission | 24 September 2023 | Ingrid Dordain |
| Loire's 4th | Dino Cinieri | LR | LR | Accumulation of mandates | 30 November 2023 | Sylvie Bonnet |
| Seine-Maritime's 3rd | Hubert Wulfranc | PCF | PCF | Accumulation of mandates | 10 January 2024 | Édouard Bénard |
| Essonne's 9th | Marie Guévenoux | RE | RE | Joined the Attal government | 8 February 2024 | Éric Husson |
| Gironde's 7th | Frédéric Zgainski | MoDem | Dem | Resumption of the exercise of the mandate of a former member of the Government | 9 February 2024 | Bérangère Couillard |
| Isère's 1st | Servane Hugues | RE | RE | Resumption of the exercise of the mandate of a former member of the Government | 9 February 2024 | Olivier Véran |
| Calvados's 6th | Freddy Sertin | Horizons | RE | Resumption of the exercise of the mandate of a former member of the Government | 9 February 2024 | Élisabeth Borne |
| Eure-et-Loir's 4th | Laurent Leclercq | MoDem | Dem | Resumption of the exercise of the mandate of a former member of the Government | 11 February 2024 | Philippe Vigier |
| Seine-Maritime's 7th | Agnès Carel | Horizons | Horizons | Resumption of the exercise of the mandate of a former member of the Government | 11 February 2024 | Agnès Firmin-Le Bodo |
| Meurthe-et-Moselle's 1st | Philippe Guillemard | RE | RE | Resumption of the exercise of the mandate of a former member of the Government | 11 February 2024 | Carole Grandjean |
| Haut-Rhin's 5th | Charlotte Goetschy-Bolognese | RE | RE | Resumption of the exercise of the mandate of a former member of the Government | 11 February 2024 | Olivier Becht |
| Paris's 7th | Clara Chassaniol | RE | RE | Resumption of the exercise of the mandate of a former member of the Government | 11 February 2024 | Clément Beaune |
| Ardèche's 2nd | Laurence Heydel Grillere | RE | RE | Resumption of the exercise of the mandate of a former member of the Government | 11 February 2024 | Olivier Dussopt |
| Yvelines's 4th | Marie Lebec | RE | RE | Joined the Attal government | 11 February 2024 | Denis Bernaert |

== See also ==
- Candidates in the 2022 French legislative election
- Election results of Cabinet Ministers during the 2022 French legislative election
- Results of the 2022 French legislative election by constituency
- List of deputies of the 15th National Assembly of France
