= Grosskost =

Grosskost is a surname. Notable people with the surname include:

- Arlette Grosskost (born 1953), French politician
- Charly Grosskost (1944–2004), French racing cyclist
