= Pascal Terrasse =

French politician

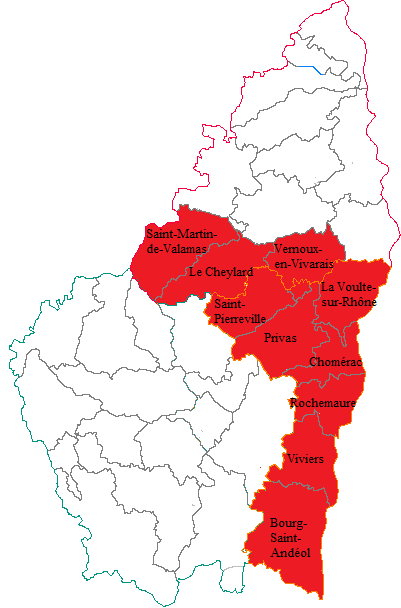
First legislative district of Ardèche

Pascal Terrasse (born October 26, 1964, in Bagnols-sur-Cèze, Gard) was a member of the National Assembly of France. He represented the first legislative district of Ardèche department from 1997 to 2017, as a member of the Socialiste, radical, citoyen et divers gauche.

Pascal Terrasse was elected president of the conseil général of Ardèche on April 3, 2006, following the resignation of Michel Teston.

On June 17, 2007, he was re-elected to represent the first district with 62% of the votes cast.
