= Hervé Saulignac =

French politician

Member of the National Assembly for Ardèche's 1st constituency
- In office 21 June 2017 – 9 June 2024

Personal details
- Born: 6 November 1970 (age 55) Privas, Ardèche, France
- Party: Socialist Party

Hervé Saulignac (born 6 November 1970 in Privas) is a French politician representing the Socialist Party. He was elected to the French National Assembly on 18 June 2017, representing the department of Ardèche.

== See also ==
- 2017 French legislative election
- List of deputies of the 15th National Assembly of France
- List of deputies of the 16th National Assembly of France
