= Michel Grall =

French politician

Member of the National Assembly for Morbihan's 2nd constituency
- In office 2007–2012
- Preceded by: Aimé Kergueris
- Succeeded by: Philippe Le Ray

Personal details
- Born: 11 September 1961 (age 65) Carnac
- Education: HEC Paris

Michel Grall (born September 11, 1961 in Carnac) is a French politician. He was a member of the National Assembly of France. He represented Morbihan's 2nd constituency from 2007 to 2012, as a member of the Union for a Popular Movement.
