= Jimmy Pahun =

French politician (born 1962)

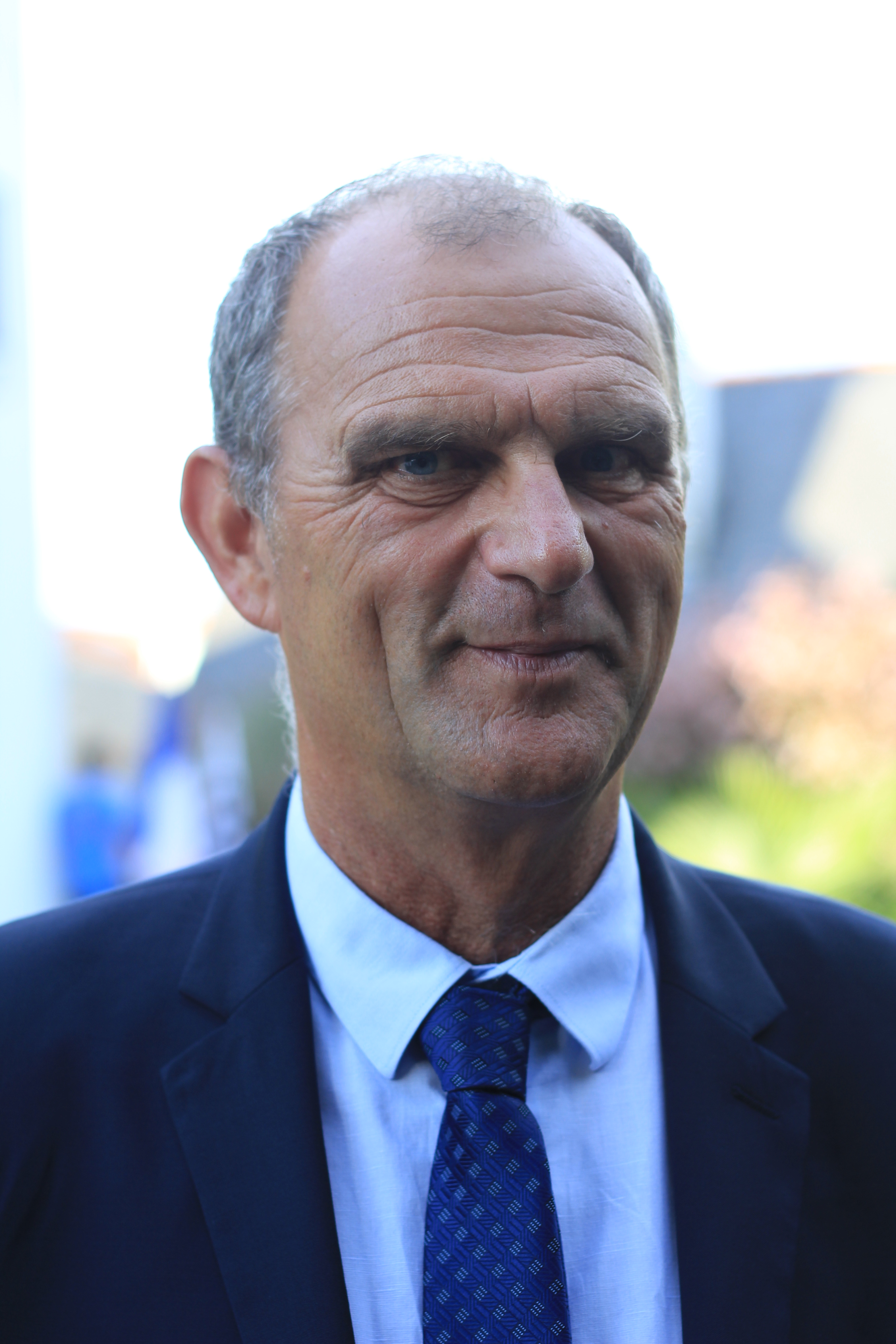
- Pahun in 2017

Member of the National Assembly for Morbihan's 2nd constituency
- Incumbent
- Assumed office 21 June 2017
- Preceded by: Philippe Le Ray

Personal details
- Born: 15 May 1962 (age 64) Port-Louis, Brittany, France
- Party: MoDem
- Education: Centre de formation des journalistes

Jimmy Pahun (born 15 May 1962) is a French politician who has represented Morbihan's 2nd constituency in the National Assembly since 2017.

== Political career ==
Pahun was the winning skipper at the Tour de France à la voile in 1992 and the 1996 transatlantic race the Transat AG2R.

Pahun was elected to the National Assembly at the 2017 legislative election as an independent. In the French Parliament, he is a member of the Democratic Movement and affiliated group.

=== Electoral results ===
==== Legislative elections ====
Election	Party	Constituency	1st round			2nd round			Ref.
Election	Party	Constituency	Votes	%	Rank	Votes	%	Result	Ref.
2017	Independent	Morbihan's 2nd	15,922	28.89	1st	21,223	51.06	Elected	
2022	MoDem	Morbihan's 2nd	19,426	32.94	1st	32,026	58.60	Elected	
2024	MoDem	Morbihan's 2nd	26,667	32.14	1st	52,138	65.44	Elected	
