= Morbihan's 2nd constituency =

Constituency of the National Assembly of France

2nd constituency of Morbihan
- inline Constituency of the National Assembly of France

- Constituency in Department

- Location of Morbihan in France
- Deputy: Jimmy Pahun; MoDem
- Department: Morbihan
- Cantons: Auray, Belle-Ile, Belz, Pluvigner, Port-Louis, Quiberon

The 2nd constituency of Morbihan is a French legislative constituency in the Morbihan département. Like the other 576 French constituencies, it elects one MP using the two-round system, with a run-off if no candidate receives over 50% of the vote in the first round.

== Historic representation ==
Election	Member	Party
1988	Aimé Kergueris	UDF
1993	Aimé Kergueris	UDF
1997	Aimé Kergueris	LD
2002	Aimé Kergueris	UMP
2007	Michel Grall	UMP
2012	Philippe Le Ray	UMP
2017	Jimmy Pahun	SE
2022	Jimmy Pahun	MoDem
2024	Jimmy Pahun	MoDem

== Election results ==
=== 2024 ===
Legislative Election 2024: Morbihan's 2nd constituency
Party	Candidate	Votes	%	±%
DVE (NFP)	Jade Béniguel	21,405	25.80	N/A
DVD	Pierre Clavreuil	7,472	9.00	N/A
RN	Florent de Kersauson	24,920	30.03	+14.68
MoDem (Ensemble)	Jimmy Pahun	26,667	32.14	−0.80
REG	Maëlig Trédan	1,615	1.95	N/A
LO	Yves Cheère	899	1.08	N/A
Turnout		82,978	97.69	+44.13
Registered electors		113,726		
2nd round result
MoDem	Jimmy Pahun	52,138	65.44	+33.30
RN	Florent de Kersauson	27,541	34.56	+4.53
Turnout		79,679	94.50	−3.19
Registered electors		113,739		
MoDem hold		Swing		

=== 2022 ===
Legislative Election 2022: Morbihan's 2nd constituency
Party	Candidate	Votes	%	±%
MoDem (Ensemble)	Jimmy Pahun	19,426	32.94	N/A
LFI (NUPÉS)	Karol Kirchner	14,667	24.87	-1.39
RN	Joseph Martin	9,054	15.35	+6.01
LR	Franck Jean Marie Vallein*	3,936	6.67	N/A
LR (UDC)	Sophie Lemoulinier	3,009	5.10	−21.80
DVC	Pierre-Léon Luneau	2,692	4.56	N/A
REC	Florence Kappeler	2,390	4.05	N/A
Others	N/A	3,806	6.45	
Turnout		58,980	53.56	−0.94
2nd round result
MoDem (Ensemble)	Jimmy Pahun	32,026	58.60	N/A
LFI (NUPÉS)	Karol Kirchner	22,630	41.40	N/A
Turnout		54,656	52.83	+6.66
MoDem gain from DIV				

* LR dissident

=== 2017 ===
Candidate	Label	First round		Second round	
Candidate	Label	Votes	%	Votes	%
Jimmy Pahun	DIV	15,922	28.89	21,223	51.06
Philippe Le Ray	LR	14,821	26.90	20,340	48.94
David Jan	FI	5,767	10.47		
Éric Fordos	FN	5,145	9.34		
Stéphanie Le Squer	PS	4,455	8.08		
Didier Coupeau	ECO	3,072	5.57		
Gwenhaëlle Le Déléter	PCF	1,180	2.14		
Véronique Coquil	REG	1,001	1.82		
Pascale Moriss	DLF	897	1.63		
Alain Malardé	REG	825	1.50		
Yves Cau-Duparc	REG	729	1.32		
Vincent Lebeuf	DVD	623	1.13		
Cyril Le Bail	EXG	364	0.66		
Alexandra Bert	DIV	304	0.55		
Votes		55,105	100.00	41,563	100.00
Valid votes		55,105	96.91	41,563	86.33
Blank votes		1,178	2.07	4,509	9.37
Null votes		577	1.01	2,073	4.31
Turnout		56,860	54.50	48,145	46.17
Abstentions		47,475	45.50	56,136	53.83
Registered voters		104,335		104,281	
Source: Ministry of the Interior

=== 2012 ===
Legislative Election 2012: Morbihan's 2nd constituency
Party	Candidate	Votes	%	±%
PS	Nathalie Le Magueresse	22,030	35.40	+16.20
DVD	Philippe Le Ray	15,144	24.34	N/A
UMP	Michel Grall	12,453	20.01	−6.55
FN	Claude Le Ny	5,584	8.97	+5.80
FG	Rolland Le Sauce	3,066	4.93	−5.33
EELV	Anne-Marie Boudou	2,767	4.45	+0.85
Others	N/A	1,186	-	−
Turnout		62,230	63.16	−2.67
2nd round result
DVD	Philippe Le Ray	31,942	51.88	N/A
PS	Nathalie Le Magueresse	29,630	48.12	+0.37
Turnout		61,572	62.49	−0.64
DVD gain from UMP				

=== 2007 ===
Legislative Election 2007: Morbihan's 2nd constituency
Party	Candidate	Votes	%	±%
UMP	Michel Grall	16,074	26.56	−12.77
PS	Nathalie Le Magueresse	11,619	19.20	−0.42
DVD	Jean-Michel Belz	10,439	17.25	N/A
PCF	Michel Le Scourarnec	6,206	10.26	−1.63
DVD	Gérard Pierre	4,946	8.17	N/A
MoDem	Christine Bellego	4,045	6.68	N/A
LV	Claire Masson	2,178	3.60	N/A
FN	Bruno Petit	1,921	3.17	−6.04
DIV	Alain Malarde	1,591	2.63	N/A
Others	N/A	1,491	-	−
Turnout		61,387	65.83	−2.98
2nd round result
UMP	Michel Grall	29,755	52.25	−8.03
PS	Nathalie Le Magueresse	27,189	47.75	+8.03
Turnout		58,845	63.13	+1.22
UMP hold				

=== 2002 ===
Legislative Election 2002: Morbihan's 2nd constituency
Party	Candidate	Votes	%	±%
UMP	Aimé Kerguéris	21,500	39.33	N/A
PS	Nathalie Le Magueresse	10,725	19.62	−1.27
PCF	Michel Le Scouarnec	6,497	11.89	−0.73
DVD	Gérard d'Aboville	6,398	11.70	N/A
FN	René Bouin	5,033	9.21	−3.23
Others	N/A	4,510	-	−
Turnout		55,581	68.81	−1.45
2nd round result
UMP	Aimé Kerguéris	29,946	60.28	N/A
PS	Nathalie Le Magueresse	19,735	39.72	−5.93
Turnout		51,691	61.91	−10.69
UMP gain from PR				

=== 1997 ===
Legislative Election 1997: Morbihan's 2nd constituency
Party	Candidate	Votes	%	±%
PR (UDF)	Aimé Kergueris	16,849	33.03	
PS	Benoît Hamon	10,656	20.89	
PCF	Michel Le Scouarnec	6,437	12.62	
FN	René Bouin	6,349	12.44	
LDI	Gérard Pierre	2,670	5.23	
DVD	Roger Keraudran	2,399	4.70	
GE	Marie-Laure Thevenot	2,085	4.09	
DIV	Christian Guenal	1,477	2.90	
REG	Yann Verney	1,209	2.37	
DVD	Patrick Le Borgnic	886	1.74	
Turnout		53,366	70.26	
2nd round result
PR (UDF)	Aimé Kergueris	28,502	54.35	
PS	Benoît Hamon	23,937	45.65	
Turnout		55,153	72.60	
PR hold				

== Sources ==
- Official results of French elections from 1998: "Résultats électoraux officiels en France" (in French).
