= Olivier Becht =

French politician (born 1976)

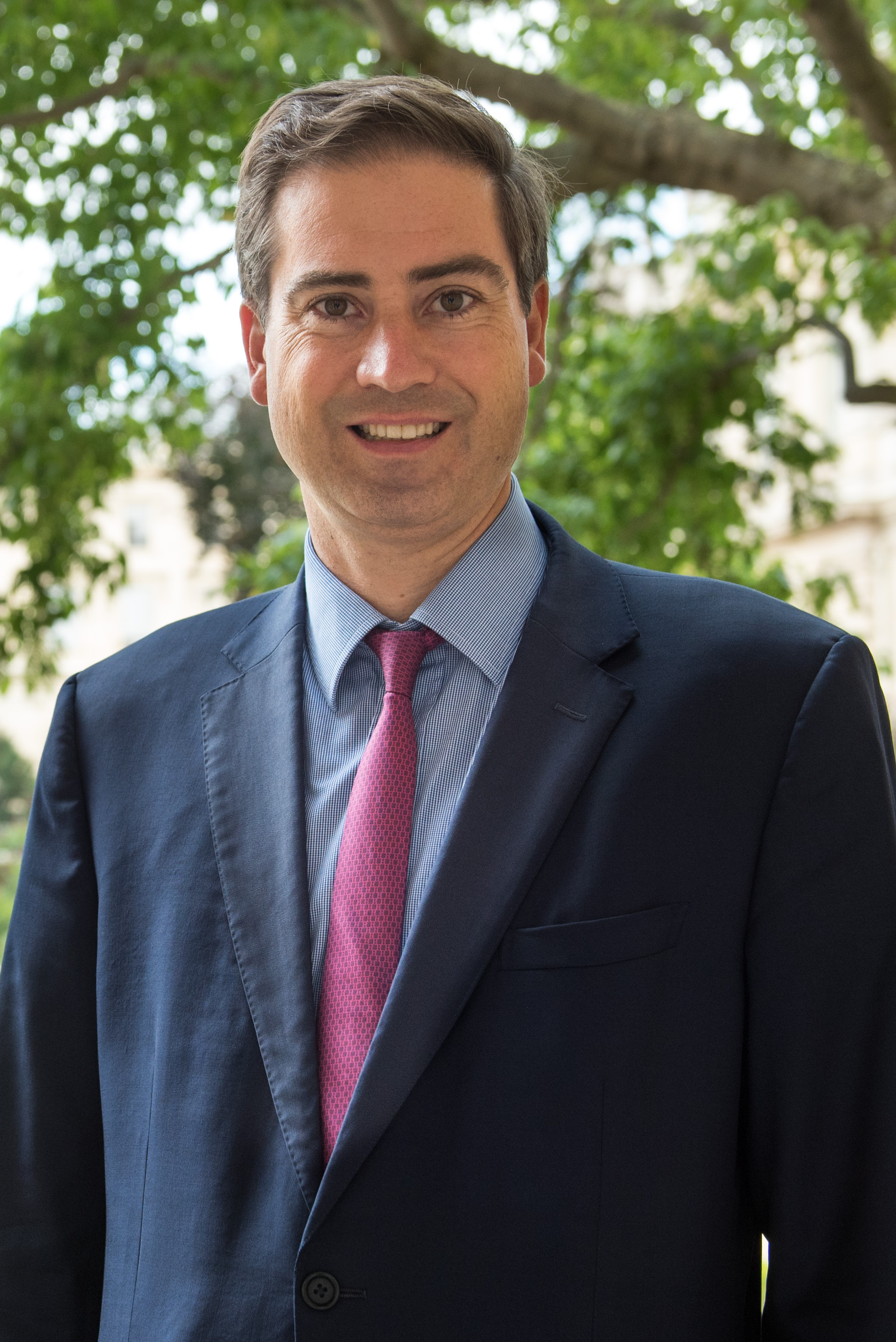

Minister Delegate for Foreign Trade, Economic Attractiveness and French Nationals Abroad
- In office 4 July 2022 – 11 January 2024
- Prime Minister: Élisabeth Borne
- Preceded by: Franck Riester
- Succeeded by: Franck Riester

Member of the National Assembly for Haut-Rhin's 5th constituency
- Incumbent
- Assumed office 12 February 2024
- Preceded by: Charlotte Goetschy-Bolognese
- In office 20 June 2017 – 4 August 2022
- Preceded by: Arlette Grosskost
- Succeeded by: Charlotte Goetschy-Bolognese

President of the Agir Ensemble group in the National Assembly
- In office 26 May 2020 – 21 June 2022
- Preceded by: Position established
- Succeeded by: Position abolished

Mayor of Rixheim
- In office 15 March 2008 – 23 March 2014
- Preceded by: Bernard Hanser
- Succeeded by: Ludovic Haye

Personal details
- Born: 28 April 1976 (age 50) Strasbourg, France
- Party: Renaissance (2022–present)
- Other political affiliations: Agir (2017–present)
- Domestic partner: Livia Stoica
- Education: Sciences Po Strasbourg; École nationale d'administration

Olivier Becht (born 28 April 1976) is a French politician of Renaissance (RE) who served as Minister Delegate for Foreign Trade, Attractiveness and French Nationals Abroad in the Borne government from 2022 to 2024.

Becht has served as a member of the National Assembly for Haut-Rhin's 5th constituency since 2024, having previously held the seat from 2017 to 2022. From 2008 to 2017, he served as the mayor of Rixheim.

== Political career ==
In parliament, Becht served as member of the Defence Committee. In this capacity, he co-authored (with Stéphane Trompille) a parliamentary report on space defence in 2019, calling on the Ministry of the Armies to upgrade its capabilities given the proliferation of competitors and potential enemies. He was also a member of the French parliamentary friendship groups with Germany, Japan and Romania.

In addition to his committee assignments, Becht was a member of the French delegation to the Parliamentary Assembly of the Council of Europe from 2017 to 2022. In this capacity, he served on the Committee on the Election of Judges to the European Court of Human Rights; the Committee on Culture, Science, Education and Media; and the Sub-Committee on Media and Information Society. In 2020, he was the Assembly's rapporteur on the regulation of neurotechnology, including brain–computer interfaces.

In September 2026, Becht announced his candidacy for the 2027 French presidential election.

== Political positions ==
In late 2019, Becht was one of 17 members of the committee who co-signed a letter to Prime Minister Édouard Philippe in which they warned that the 365 million euro ($406 million) sale of aerospace firm Groupe Latécoère to U.S. fund Searchlight Capital raised "questions about the preservation of know-how and France's defence industry base" and urged government intervention.
