= Marie-Christine Dalloz =

French politician (born 1958)

Member of the National Assembly for Jura's 2nd constituency
- Incumbent
- Assumed office 17 June 2007
- Preceded by: Jean Charropin

Personal details
- Born: 10 January 1958 (age 68) Saint-Claude, France
- Party: UMP (2007-2015); The Republicans (2015 onwards)

Marie-Christine Dalloz (born 10 January 1958) is a French politician of The Republicans who has been serving as a member of the National Assembly of France since 2007, representing the Jura department.

== Political career ==
In parliament, Dalloz is a member of the Committee on Finances, Economic Affairs and Budget Control. In addition to her committee assignments, she is the president of the Parliamentary Friendship Group with Jamaica and a member of the groups for Burkina Faso, Italy and Switzerland.

Dalloz has also been serving as a member of the French delegation to the Parliamentary Assembly of the Council of Europe since 2014. As a member of the European People's Party group, she served as chairwoman of the Committee on Social Affairs, Health, and Sustainable Development before becoming a member of the Committee on Political Affairs and Democracy. She participated in several cross-party delegations to observe the 2017 parliamentary elections in Bulgaria, the 2018 presidential election in Montenegro, and the 2019 presidential election in North Macedonia.

== Political positions ==
In 2016, Dalloz publicly endorsed Nicolas Sarkozy in the Republicans' primaries for the 2017 presidential elections.

In July 2019, Dalloz voted against the French ratification of the European Union’s Comprehensive Economic and Trade Agreement (CETA) with Canada.
