= Arlette Grosskost =

French politician

Member of the French National Assembly for Haut-Rhin's 5th constituency
- In office 19 June 2002 – 20 June 2017
- Preceded by: Jean-Marie Bockel
- Succeeded by: Olivier Becht

Personal details
- Born: 19 July 1953 (age 72) Wissembourg, France
- Party: The Republicans

Arlette Grosskost (born 19 July 1953) was a member of the National Assembly of France. She represented the Haut-Rhin department, and is a member of The Republicans (France).

== Biography ==
His parents were Jacques Woock-Spiess, a railway worker and member of the Resistance, and Jeanne Laugel.

Deputy RPR candidate for Joseph Klifa in the 1997 legislative elections, she was second on Senator Hubert Haenel list in the 1998 regional elections.

She was elected to the House of Representatives on June 16, 2002, for the 12th legislative term (2002-2007), in the 5th district of Haut-Rhin.

She was re-elected on June 17, 2007, defeating socialist Pierre Freyburger by 56.27% to 43.73%. To protest against the appointment of socialist senator and mayor Jean-Marie Bockel to the government, she registered only as an affiliate of the UMP group.

Arlette Grosskost is also a business lawyer, although she does not practice law during her political term. She announced her candidacy for the 2008 municipal elections at the head of the UMP list, but ultimately withdrew at the end of August 2007 in favor of a so-called “open” list led by Jean-Marie Bockel, which included Jean Rottner (deputy for the MP) in second position, as well as members of the UMP, Democratic Movement (France), and Socialists loyal to the mayor.

Arlette Grosskost was re-elected on June 17, 2012, with 55.76% of the vote, alongside her deputy Olivier Becht, in an enlarged constituency (14 municipalities) following electoral redistribution, which now includes the canton of Habsheim.

A signatory member of the Popular Right charter, a collective she left in spring 2011, Arlette Grosskost supported François Fillon candidacy for the presidency of the UMP and the Modern and Humanist France movement at the fall 2012 congress.

She supports Alain Juppé in the 2016 French primary election for the right and center.
