= Charlotte Goetschy-Bolognese =

French member of Parliament

Member of the National Assembly for Haut-Rhin's 5th constituency
- In office 5 August 2022 – 11 February 2024
- Preceded by: Olivier Becht
- Succeeded by: Olivier Becht

Municipal councilor of Brunstatt-Didenheim
- Incumbent
- Assumed office 18 May 2020

Personal details
- Born: 21 July 1990 (age 36) Mulhouse, France

Charlotte Goetschy-Bolognese is a French politician who served as a member of the National Assembly for the 5th constituency of Haut-Rhin from 2022 to 2024 as the substitute of Olivier Becht.

== Early life and career ==
Goetschy-Bolognese was born in 1990, she is married and has two children.

She graduated in accounting from Strasbourg and manages a public works equipment company in Richwiller with her husband and father.

== Political career ==
Goetschy-Bolognese is municipal councilor of Brunstatt-Didenheim in charge of communication.

She is also president of a local association called “Les demoiselles de Brunstatt”.

Following the appointment of Olivier Becht in the Borne government, Goetschy-Bolognese became deputy for the Haut-Rhin's 5th constituency. She joined the Renaissance group.
