= Haut-Rhin's 5th constituency =

Constituency of the National Assembly of France

5th constituency of the Haut-Rhin
- inline Constituency of the National Assembly of France

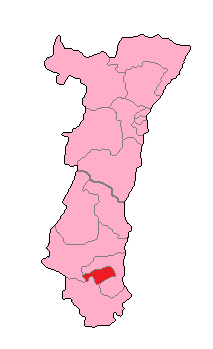
- Haut-Rhin's 5th Constituency shown within Alsace
- Deputy: Charlotte Goetschy-Bolognese; Agir
- Department: Haut-Rhin
- Cantons: Mulhouse Ouest, Mulhouse Sud, Mulhouse Est, Habsheim
- Registered voters: 77,489

The 5th constituency of the Haut-Rhin is a French legislative constituency in the Haut-Rhin département.

== Description ==
The constituency is composed almost entirely by the city of Mulhouse with only the addition of the Canton of Habsheim to the east beyond its immediate boundaries.

Unlike other constituencies in Haut-Rhin the 5th has returned left-wing candidates on no less than four occasions. However, from 2002 to 2022 it was held by the centre-right, before being won by Emmanuel Macron's centrist Ensemble Citoyens alliance.

== Historic Representation ==
Election	Member	Party
1958	Émile Muller	SFIO
1962	Raymond Zimmermann	UNR
1967	Raymond Zimmermann	UDR
1968	Raymond Zimmermann	UDR
1973	Raymond Zimmermann	UDR
1978	Émile Muller	UDF
1981	Jean-Marie Bockel	PS
1986	Proportional representation - no election by constituency	
1988	Jean-Marie Bockel	PS
1993	Joseph Klifa	UDF
1997	Jean-Marie Bockel	PS
2002	Arlette Grosskost	UMP
2007	Arlette Grosskost	UMP
2012	Arlette Grosskost	UMP
2017	Olivier Becht	DVD
2020	Olivier Becht	Agir
2022	Olivier Becht	Agir
2022	Charlotte Goetschy-Bolognese	Agir

== Election results ==
=== 2024 ===
Legislative Election 2024: Haut-Rhin's 5th constituency
Party	Candidate	Votes	%	±%
RE (Ensemble)	Olivier Becht	17,749	37.23	−3.08
DIV	Rachid Lounès	567	1.19	n/a
Volt	David Dolui	308	0.65	n/a
G.s (NFP)	Nadia El Hajjaji	12776	26.89	+6.48
LO	Salah Keltoumi	287	0.60	n/a
RN	Pierre Pinto	14096	29.56	+13.43
REC	Emmanuel Taffarelli	544	1.14	−3.34
REG	Romain Spinali	249	0.52	n/a
UL	Jean-Frédéric Baechler	1104	2.32	−0.11
Turnout		47,680	97.48	+55.38
Registered electors		76,089		
2nd round result
RE	Olivier Becht	31,766	67.00	+29.77
RN	Pierre Pinto	15,649	33.00	3.44
Turnout		47,415	96.25	−1.23
Registered electors		76,120		
RE hold		Swing		

=== 2022 ===
Legislative Election 2022: Haut-Rhin's 5th constituency
Party	Candidate	Votes	%	±%
Agir (Ensemble)	Olivier Becht*	12,801	40.31	+7.37
G.s (NUPÉS)	Nadia El Hajjaji	6,452	20.32	+6.53
RN	Pierre Pinto	5,122	16.13	+3.91
LR (UDC)	Florian Colom	1,717	5.41	−20.05
REC	Emmanuel Taffarelli	1,424	4.48	N/A
UL (REG)	Régis Baschung	772	2.43	−1.11
DVE	Marie Odile Steimer	699	2.20	+0.96
DIV	André Chamy	667	2.10	N/A
Others	N/A	1,495	-	−
Turnout		31,756	42.10	−1.16
2nd round result
Agir (Ensemble)	Olivier Becht*	18,443	64.63	+22.32
G.s (NUPÉS)	Nadia El Hajjaji	10,094	35.37	N/A
Turnout		28,537	39.78	+2.18
Agir gain from DVD				

* In the previous election, Becht was an independent centre-right candidate supported by LR. Swing calculations are based on parties and alliances, with Becht's 2017 results counted against the 2022 LR candidate.

=== 2017 ===
Legislative Election 2017: Haut-Rhin's 5th constituency
Party	Candidate	Votes	%	±%
LREM	Cécile Lehr	11,043	32.94	
DVD	Olivier Becht	10,211	30.46	
FN	Christelle Ritz	4,097	12.22	
LFI	Geneviève Enggasser	2,469	7.37	
REG	Ghislaine Rough Dit Gaillard (Unser Land)	1,188	3.54	
EELV	Florence Peter	1,106	3.30	
PS	Abdellatif Timdouine	838	2.50	
Others	N/A	2,571		
Turnout		33,523	43.26	
2nd round result
DVD	Olivier Becht	16,807	57.69	
LREM	Cécile Lehr	12,327	42.31	
Turnout		29,134	37.60	
DVD gain from LR				

=== 2012 ===
Legislative Election 2012: Haut-Rhin's 5th constituency
Party	Candidate	Votes	%	±%
UMP	Arlette Grosskost	16,288	39.89	
PS	Pierre Freyburger	13,802	33.80	
FN	Ludovic De Danne	6,845	16.76	
EELV	Djamila Sonzogni	1,381	3.38	
MoDem	Emmanuelle Suarez	874	2.14	
FG	Alne Parmentier	856	2.10	
Others	N/A	790		
Turnout		40,836	51.79	
2nd round result
UMP	Arlette Grosskost	21,733	55.76	
PS	Pierre Freyburger	17,246	44.24	
Turnout		38,979	49.44	
UMP hold				

=== 2007 ===
Legislative Election 2007: Haut-Rhin's 5th Constituency 2nd round
Party	Candidate	Votes	%	±%
UMP	Arlette Grosskost	14,977	56.27	
PS	Pierre Freyburger	11,641	43.73	
Turnout		27,618	50.65	
UMP hold		Swing		

=== 2002 ===
Legislative Election 2002: Haut-Rhin's 5th Constituency 2nd round
Party	Candidate	Votes	%	±%
UMP	Arlette Grosskost	15,816	55.87	
PS	Jean-Marie Bockel	12,491	44.13	
Turnout		29,167	56.34	
UMP hold		Swing		
