= Pyrénées-Atlantiques's 2nd constituency =

Constituency of the National Assembly of France

- inline Constituency of the National Assembly of France

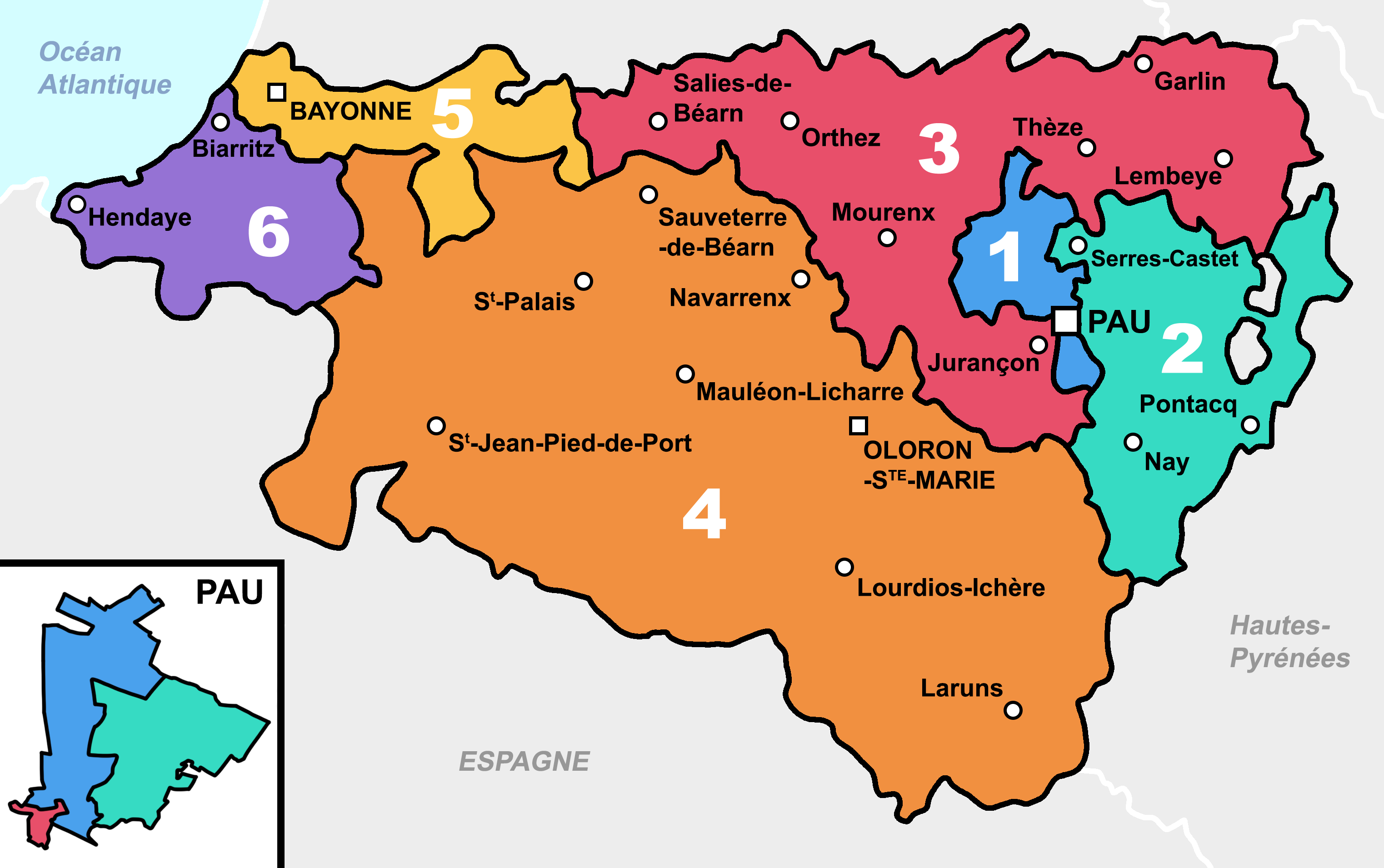
- The different constituencies of the Pyrénées-Atlantiques

- Pyrénées-Atlantiques in France
- Deputy: Jean-Paul Mattei; MoDem
- Department: Pyrénées-Atlantiques

The 2nd constituency of the Pyrénées-Atlantiques (French: deuxième circonscription des Pyrénées-Atlantiques) is a French legislative constituency in the Pyrénées-Atlantiques département. Like the other 576 French constituencies, it elects one MP using the two-round system, with a run-off if no candidate receives over 50% of the vote in the first round.

== Assembly Members ==
François Bayrou, the leader of MoDem, held the seat from 1988 until his defeat by the Socialist Party's Nathalie Chabanne in 2012.

Election	Member	Party
1988	François Bayrou	UDF
1993	François Bayrou	UDF
1997	François Bayrou	UDF
2002	François Bayrou	UDF
2007	François Bayrou	MoDem
2012	Nathalie Chabanne	PS
2017	Jean-Paul Mattei	MoDem
2022	Jean-Paul Mattei	MoDem
2024	Jean-Paul Mattei	MoDem

== Election results ==
=== 2024 ===
Candidate	Party	Alliance	First round		Second round	
Candidate	Party	Alliance	Votes	%	Votes	%
Monique Becker	RN		18,910	31.14	21,242	36.26
Jean-Paul Mattei	MoDEM	Ensemble	17,972	29.60	37,347	63.74
Sylvie Gabin	LE-EELV	NPF	16,083	26.49		
Marc Labat	LR		4,647	7.65		
Jacques Mauhourat	Ind	LE-EELV	1,497	1,497 2.47		
Eric Mercier	Ind	REG	1,079	1.78		
Cyrille Marconi	LO		530	0.87		
Valid votes			60,718	97.37	58,589	94.23
Blank votes			1,130	1.81	2,583	4.15
Null votes			508	0.81	1,007	1.62
Turnout			62,356	73.64	62,179	73.43
Abstentions			2,316	26.36	22,498	26.57
Registered voters			84,672		84,677	
Result			MoDEM HOLD			

=== 2022 ===
Legislative Election 2022: Pyrénées-Atlantiques's 2nd constituency
Party	Candidate	Votes	%	±%
MoDem (Ensemble)	Jean-Paul Mattei	14,826	34.20	-7.44
EELV (NUPÉS)	Cécile Faure	11,040	25.47	-2.30
RN	Frédérique Jont	7,128	16.44	+7.21
R!	Emilie Lassus-David	3,377	7.79	N/A
REC	Marc Gairin	2,887	6.66	N/A
DVE	Jacques Mauhourat	1,618	3.73	N/A
Others	N/A	2,470	5.70	
Turnout		43,346	53.65	−1.80
2nd round result
MoDem (Ensemble)	Jean-Paul Mattei	21,720	54.71	-6.22
EELV (NUPÉS)	Cécile Faure	17,980	45.29	+6.22
Turnout		39,700	52.36	+4.88
MoDem hold				

=== 2017 ===
Results of the 11 June and 18 June 2017 French National Assembly election in Pyrénées-Atlantiques' 2nd Constituency
Candidate	Party		1st round		2nd round	
Candidate	Party		Votes	%	Votes	%
Jean-Paul Mattei	Democratic Movement	MoDem	18,019	41.64	20,584	60.93
Nathalie Chabanne	Socialist Party	PS	6,244	14.43	13,198	39.07
Eric Saubatte	The Republicans	LR	6,065	14.02		
Thierry Moutou	La France Insoumise	FI	4,341	10.03		
Joseph Damour	National Front	FN	3,995	9.23		
Héléna Timmer-Blanchard	Ecologist	ECO	1,434	3.31		
Jacques Mauhourat	Ecologist	ECO	1,407	3.25		
Philippe Palengat	Miscellaneous Right	DVD	529	1.22		
Alain Baudorre	Miscellaneous Right	DVD	526	1.22		
Antoine Missier	Far Left	EXG	293	0.68		
Samantha Kerrache	Independent	DIV	249	0.58		
Aurélien Corbillon	Independent	DIV	172	0.40		
Total			43,274	100%	33,782	100%
Registered voters			80,073		80,072	
Blank/Void ballots			1,124	2.53%	4,237	11.14%
Turnout			44,398	55.45%	38,019	47.48%
Abstentions			35,675	44.55%	42,053	52.52%
Result					MoDEM GAIN FROM PS	

=== 2012 ===
The 2012 election in this constituency attracted media interest as long-serving MP, national political figure and three-time presidential candidate François Bayrou appeared to be facing unprecedented difficulty. The mainstream right had not stood a candidate against him until 2002, and in 2007, the candidate of the Union for a Popular Movement had withdrawn in his favour in the second round. Following Bayrou's personal endorsement of François Hollande for the second round of the 2012 presidential election, however, the UMP withdrew its earlier promise not to stand a candidate against him. The UMP considered standing Frédéric Nihous, a former presidential candidate for a small hunters' party, as its candidate, but Nihous declined, saying he would support the UMP without being its candidate. Local party member Éric Saubatte was chosen instead. Bayrou also had to contend with a Socialist opponent, despite there having been talk in the Socialist Party of not standing a candidate in his constituency, as a gesture of acknowledgment for his endorsement of Hollande.

Under French electoral law, in legislative elections, a third-placed candidate may advance to the second round if he or she obtains the votes of at least 12.5% of registered voters. This is what happened, as third-placed candidate Éric Saubatte (UMP) was able to take part in a three-way runoff vote.

Results of the 10 June and 17 June 2012 French National Assembly election in Pyrénées-Atlantiques' 2nd Constituency
Candidate	Party		1st round		2nd round	
Candidate	Party		Votes	%	Votes	%
Nathalie Chabanne	Socialist Party	PS	16,761	34.90	20,090	42.78
François Bayrou	Democratic Movement	MoDem	11,348	23.63	14,169	30.17
Éric Saubatte	Union for a Presidential Majority	UMP	10,432	21.72	12,700	27.04
Jessica Bernardez	National Front	FN	4,477	9.32		
Denis Labouret	Left Front	FG	2,516	5.24		
Eurydice Bled	Europe Ecology – The Greens	EELV	1,317	2.74		
CANDIDATE	Arise the Republic	DLR	354	0.74		
Marc Vercoutere	Ecologist	ECO	308	0.64		
Didier Perrin	National Centre of Independents and Peasants	CNIP	199	0.41		
Marianne Ligou	New Anticapitalist Party	NPA	181	0.38		
Frédéric Steinbauer	Workers' Struggle	LO	127	0.26		
Total			48,020	100%	46,959	100%
Registered voters			77,703		77,678	
Blank/Void ballots			776	1.59%	1,192	2.48%
Turnout			48,796	62.80%	48,151	61.99%
Abstentions			28,907	37.20%	29,527	38.01%
Result					PS GAIN FROM MoDEM	

=== 2007 ===
Although François Bayou kept his seat, he switched from the UDF to his newly founded MoDem.

Any candidate obtaining the votes of at least 12.5% of registered voters could advance to the second round. The candidate of the Union for a Popular Movement, Jean-Pierre Marine, finished second behind Bayrou in the first round, and withdrew from the second, endorsing Bayrou so as not to split the centre-right electorate between two candidates. Third-placed Socialist candidate Marie-Pierre Cabanne was thus Bayrou's only opponent in the final round.

Results of the 10 June and 17 June 2007 French National Assembly election in Pyrénées-Atlantiques' 2nd Constituency
Candidate	Party		1st round		2nd round	
Candidate	Party		Votes	%	Votes	%
François Bayrou	Democratic Movement	MoDem	18,250	37.25	25,677	61.21
Jean-Pierre Marine	Union for a Presidential Majority	UMP	12,696	25.92	WITHDREW	
Marie-Pierre Cabanne	Socialist Party	PS	11,423	23.32	16,273	38.79
Frédéric Nihous	Hunting, Fishing, Nature and Traditions	CPNT	1,173	2.39		
Nicole Juyoux	The Greens	LV	1,155	2.36		
Michèle Darricarrere	National Front	FN	1,120	2.29		
Claire Rey	Communist Party	PCF	939	1.92		
Bruno Bajou	Revolutionary Communist League	LCR	834	1.70		
Pierre Arrabie-Aubies	Far Left	EXG	365	0.75		
Roger Falliex	Movement for France	MPF	336	0.75		
Karine Zebda	Independent	DIV	274	0.56		
Alain Pecassou	Independent	DIV	224	0.46		
Frédéric Steinbauer	Far Left	EXG	161	0.33		
Marc Vercoutère	Independent	DIV	7	0.01		
Total			48,987	100%	41,950	100%
Registered voters			74,315		74,311	
Blank/Void ballots			639	1.29%	4,674	10.02%
Turnout			49,626	66.78%	46,624	62.74%
Abstentions			24,689	33.22%	27,687	37.26%
Result					MoDEM GAIN FROM UDF	

=== 2002 ===
Results of the 9 June and 16 June 2002 French National Assembly election in Pyrénées-Atlantiques 2nd Constituency
Candidate	Party		1st round		2nd round	
Candidate	Party		Votes	%	Votes	%
François Bayrou	Union for French Democracy	UDF	20,425	41.79	25,106	55.58
Georges Labazee	Socialist Party	PS	15,353	31.41	20,062	44.42
Jean Saint-Josse	Hunting, Fishing, Nature and Traditions	CPNT	4,611	9.43		
Marie-France Llucia-Latour	National Front	FN	3,223	6.59		
Nicole Juyoux	The Greens	LV	1,463	2.99		
Yves Péré	Communist Party	PCF	1,310	2.68		
Christiane Alias	Revolutionary Communist League	LCR	641	1.31		
Colette Ducousso	Movement for France	MPF	579	1.18		
Frédéric Steinbauer	Workers' Struggle	LO	315	0.64		
Michel Dantin	Regionalist	REG	277	0.57		
Michel Catuhe	Other	AUT	241	0.49		
Henri Daudu	National Republican Movement	MNR	239	0.49		
Ginette Desport	Far Right	EXD	196	0.40		
Didier Calmon	Far Left	EXG	0	0.00		
Total			48,873	100%	45,168	100%
Registered voters			69,447		69,440	
Blank/Void ballots			1,029	2.06%	2,116	4.48%
Turnout			49,902	71.86%	47,284	68.09%
Abstentions			19,545	28.14%	22,156	31.91%
Result					UDF HOLD	
