= Michel Herbillon =

French politician

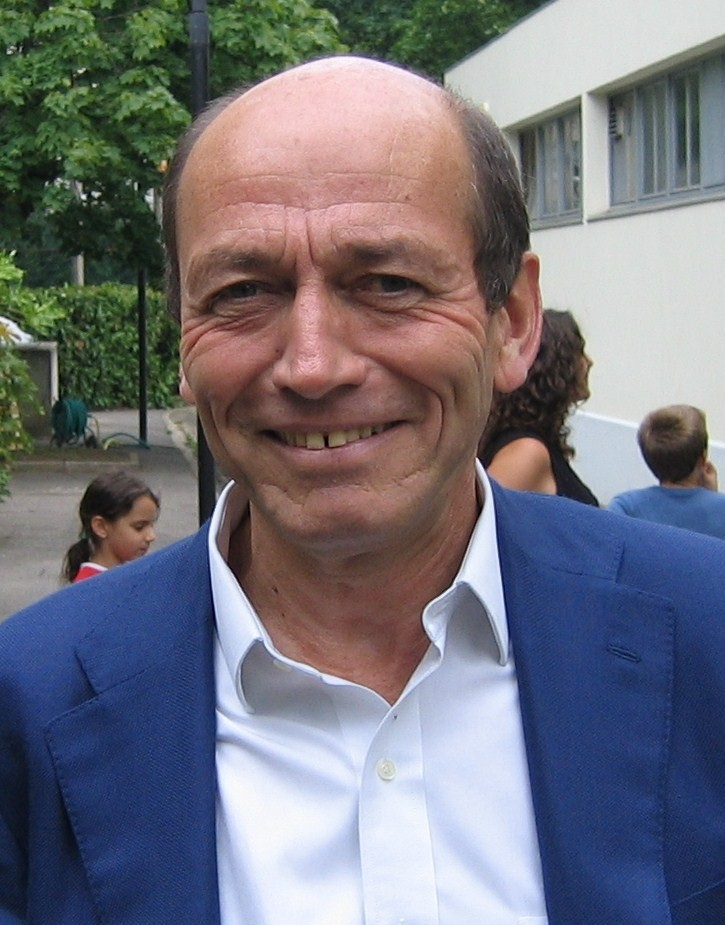

Member of the National Assembly for Val-de-Marne's 8th constituency
- Incumbent
- Assumed office 12 June 1997
- Preceded by: Alain Griotteray

Mayor of Maisons-Alfort
- In office 23 May 1992 – 2 July 2017
- Preceded by: René Nectoux
- Succeeded by: Olivier Capitanio

Personal details
- Born: 6 March 1951 (age 75) Saint-Mandé, France
- Party: The Republicans (2015–present)
- Other political affiliations: Republican Party/Union for French Democracy (until 1997); Liberal Democracy (1997–2002); Union for a Popular Movement (2002–2015)

Michel Herbillon (born 6 March 1951) is a French politician who has represented the 8th constituency of the Val-de-Marne department in the National Assembly since 1997.

A member of The Republicans (LR), formerly the Union for a Popular Movement (UMP), he previously held a seat in the General Council of Val-de-Marne from 1989 to 1998, elected in the canton of Maisons-Alfort-Sud, as well as the mayorship of Maisons-Alfort from 1992 until 2017.

== Political career ==
In Parliament, Herbillon serves on the Committee on Foreign Affairs, of which he holds a vice presidency since 2017, as well as on the Committee on European Affairs. In addition to his committee assignments, he is part of the French-Cambodian Parliamentary Friendship Group. Since 2019, he has also been a member of the French delegation to the Franco-German Parliamentary Assembly.

== Political positions ==
In The Republicans' 2016 presidential primary, Herbillon endorsed Jean-François Copé as the party's candidate for the office of President of France. In The Republicans' 2017 leadership election, he endorsed Laurent Wauquiez.

In July 2019, Herbillon voted against the French ratification of the European Union's Comprehensive Economic and Trade Agreement (CETA) with Canada.

== Personal life ==
On 15 March 2020, Herbillon tested positive for COVID-19.
