= Jean-Paul Matteï =

French politician (born 1954)

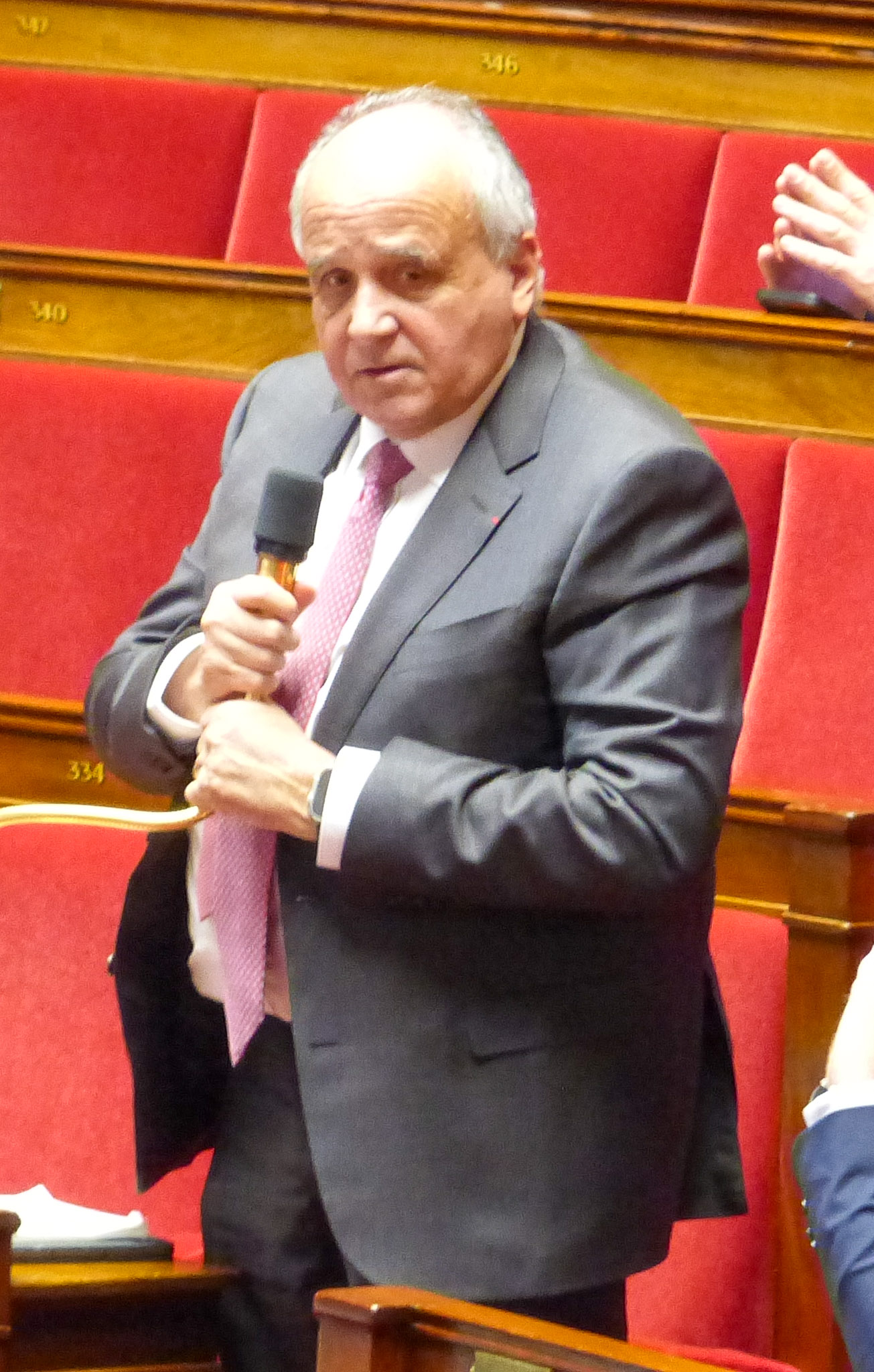
- Matteï in 2025

Member of the National Assembly for Pyrénées-Atlantiques's 2nd constituency
- Incumbent
- Assumed office 21 June 2017
- Preceded by: Nathalie Chabanne

President of the Democratic, MoDem and Independents group in the National Assembly
- In office 28 June 2022 – 9 June 2024
- Preceded by: Patrick Mignola
- Succeeded by: Marc Fesneau

Mayor of Ger
- In office 18 March 2001 – 14 July 2017
- Preceded by: René Lafon-Puyo
- Succeeded by: Bernard Poublan

Personal details
- Born: 21 March 1954 (age 72) Saarburg, Germany
- Party: Democratic Movement

Jean-Paul Matteï (born 21 March 1954) is a French politician who has served as the deputy for Pyrénées-Atlantiques's 2nd constituency in the National Assembly since 2017. A member of the Democratic Movement, Matteï was also the president of the Assembly's Democratic, MoDem and Independents group from 2022 to 2024.

== Early life and professional career ==
Jean-Paul Matteï was born in Saarburg, Germany on 21 March 1954. He began his career as a notary and co-founded the firm Sel Matteï & Associés in 1993. Matteï would continue his legal work after entering politics, presiding over the Association des Notaires conseils d'entreprises (NCE) from 2010 to 2017 before becoming a deputy.

== Political career ==
Matteï originally became involved in politics as a student, joining the Union for French Democracy and then its successor the Democratic Movement (MoDem). He first ran for office in the 2012 French legislative elections as a substitute for MoDem leader François Bayrou, who was elected in Pyrénées-Atlantiques's 2nd constituency. Matteï then won the same constituency as a candidate for deputy in the 2017 elections, receiving 60.93% of the vote in the run-off against Socialist incumbent Nathalie Chabanne.

Matteï served as the president of the Democratic, MoDem and Independents group in the National Assembly from 2022 to 2024. In 2023, he took part in the debate over the pension reform law, proposing an increase in France's weekly work hours in order to generate more contributions to social security.

Contrary to Bayrou, Matteï opposed President Emmanuel Macron's dissolution of the National Assembly on 9 June 2024, arguing that it was a "very rushed" decision that could see more National Rally deputies enter the Assembly in the subsequent legislative elections.
