= Ardèche's 1st constituency =

Constituency of the National Assembly of France

1st constituency of Ardèche
- inline Constituency of the National Assembly of France

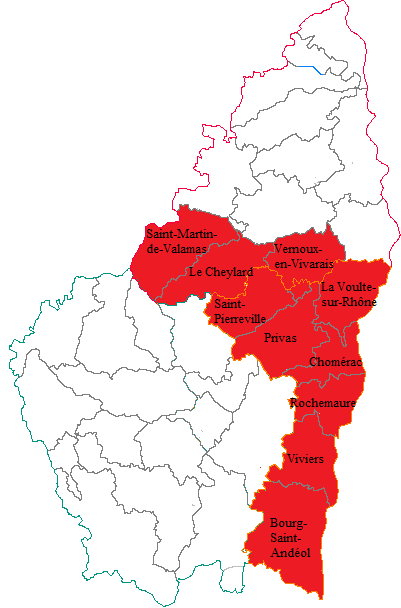
- constituency's location in Ardèche

- Ardèche's location in France
- Deputy: Hervé Saulignac; PS
- Department: Ardèche
- Cantons: Bourg-Saint-Andéol, Le Cheylard, Chomérac, Privas, Rochemaure, Saint-Martin-de-Valamas, Saint-Pierreville, Vernoux-en-Vivarais, Viviers, La Voulte-sur-Rhône
- Registered voters: 98,395

The 1st constituency of Ardèche is a French legislative constituency in the Ardèche département.

== Deputies ==
Election	Member	Party
1988	Robert Chapuis	PS
1993	Arnaud Cazin d'Honincthun	PR
1997	Pascal Terrasse	PS
2002	Pascal Terrasse	PS
2007	Pascal Terrasse	PS
2012	Pascal Terrasse	PS
2017	Hervé Saulignac	PS
2022	Hervé Saulignac	PS
2024	Hervé Saulignac	PS

== Election results ==
=== 2024 ===
Candidate	Party	Alliance	First round			Second round		
Candidate	Party	Alliance	Votes	%	+/–	Votes	%	+/–
Céline Porquet	RN		21,736	39.95	+13.63	25,419	47.32	
Hervé Saulignac	PS	NFP	20,809	38.24	-0.04	28,303	52.68	
Séverine Gineys	MoDem	ENS	6,651	12.22	-4.90			
Marie-Pierre Chaix	LR		3,067	5.64	N/A			
Thierry Dorne	DLF		651	1.20	-0.33			
Muriel Vander Donckt	LO		518	0.95	-0.83			
Maryse Leclerc	REC		506	0.93	-2.86			
Pascal Chambonnet	PT		474	0.87	-0.26			
Valid votes			54,412	97.18	-0.29	53,722	94.34	
Blank votes			1,072	1.91	+0.18	2,308	4.05	
Null votes			507	0.91	+0.11	918	1.61	
Turnout			55,991	70.34	+19.28	56,948	71.55	
Abstentions			23,605	29.66	-19.28	22,648	28.45	
Registered voters			79,596			79,596		
Source: Ministry of the Interior, Le Monde
Result						PS HOLD		

=== 2022 ===
Legislative Election 2022: Ardèche's 1st constituency
Party	Candidate	Votes	%	±%
PS (NUPÉS)	Hervé Saulignac	15,107	38.28	+2.47
RN	Céline Porquet	9,202	23.32	+8.24
MoDem (Ensemble)	Severine Gineys	6,757	17.12	−6.50
DVD (UDC)	Michel Valla	4,081	10.34	−4.99
REC	Marie-Élisabeth Flach	1,494	3.79	N/A
Others	N/A	2,824	-	−
Turnout		39,465	51.06	−0.24
2nd round result
PS (NUPÉS)	Hervé Saulignac	21,550	60.05	+2.03
RN	Céline Porquet	14,339	39.95	N/A
Turnout		35,889	49.44	+5.61
PS hold				

=== 2017 ===
Candidate	Label	First round		Second round	
Candidate	Label	Votes	%	Votes	%
André Dupont	REM	9,203	23.62	12,294	41.98
Hervé Saulignac	PS	7,422	19.05	16,993	58.02
François Arsac	UDI	5,972	15.33		
Céline Porquet	FN	5,876	15.08		
Luisa Gaillard Sanchez	FI	5,117	13.14		
François Jacquart	PCF	1,812	4.65		
Olivier Keller	ECO	1,410	3.62		
Claire Calon	DIV	410	1.05		
Christian Grangis	EXD	369	0.95		
Gilles Bas	ECO	365	0.94		
Alain Barnier	EXD	297	0.76		
Muriel Vander Donckt	EXG	272	0.70		
Zoubida Abbas	DIV	220	0.56		
Guérin de Longevialle	DIV	210	0.54		
Votes		38,955	100.00	29,287	100.00
Valid votes		38,955	97.44	29,287	85.75
Blank votes		725	1.81	3,215	9.41
Null votes		297	0.74	1,651	4.83
Turnout		39,977	51.30	34,153	43.83
Abstentions		37,950	48.70	43,767	56.17
Registered voters		77,927		77,920	
Source: Ministry of the Interior

=== 2012 ===
Summary of the 10 June and 17 June 2012 French legislative in Ardèche's 1st Constituency election results
Candidate	Party		1st round		2nd round	
Candidate	Party		Votes	%	Votes	%
Pascal Terrasse	Socialist Party	PS	20,381	45.13%	27,581	67.20%
Christian Grangis	National Front	FN	9,123	20.20%	13,463	32.80%
Guérin de Longevialle	Miscellaneous Right	DVD	7,046	15.60%		
François Jacquart	Left Front	FG	4,269	9.45%		
Stéphane Oriol	The Greens	VEC	2,030	4.50%		
André Dupont		CEN	1,404	3.11%		
Gilles Bas	Ecologist	ECO	388	0.86%		
Patricia Soncini-Syren	Far Left	EXG	292	0.65%		
Muriel Vander Donckt	Far Left	EXG	225	0.50%		
François Martigny	Other	AUT	1	0.00%		
Total			45,159	100%	41,044	100%
Registered voters			76,645		76,625	
Blank/Void ballots			1,246	2.69%	3,428	7.71%
Turnout			46,405	60.55%	44,472	58.04%
Abstentions			30,240	39.45%	32,153	41.96%
Result					PS HOLD	

=== 2007 ===
Summary of the 10 June and 17 June 2007 French legislative in Ardèche’s 1st Constituency election results
Candidate	Party		1st round		2nd round	
Candidate	Party		Votes	%	Votes	%
Pascal Terrasse	Socialist Party	PS	20,268	43.43%	28,639	61.67%
Rachel Cotta	Union for a Popular Movement	UMP	13,971	29.94%	17,803	38.33%
Robert Cotta	Communist	COM	2,811	6.02%		
Jean-Yves Imbert	Democratic Movement	MoDem	2,316	4.96%		
Christiane Bertheas	National Front	FN	1,901	4.07%		
Christian Lavis	Majorité Presidentielle		1,363	2.92%		
Cécile Moulain	Far Left	EXG	1,064	2.28%		
Yvette Noilly	The Greens	VEC	1,052	2.25%		
Marjorie Brottes	Hunting, Fishing, Nature, Traditions	CPNT	914	1.94%		
Nadège le Toux	Movement for France	MPF	363	0.78%		
Gilles Bas	Divers	DIV	305	0.65%		
Christian Prada	Far Left	EXG	228	0.49%		
Anne Alirol	Regionalist	REG	114	0.24%		
Marie-Odile le Gorgeu	Divers	DIV	1	0.00%		
Total			46,671	100%	46,442	100%
Registered voters			73,759		73,752	
Blank/Void ballots			731	1.54%	1,063	2.24%
Turnout			47,402	64.27%	47,505	64.41%
Abstentions			26,357	35.73%	26,247	35.59%
Result					PS HOLD	

=== 2002 ===
Summary of the 9 June and 16 June 2002 French legislative in Ardèche’s 1st Constituency election results
Candidate	Party		1st round		2nd round	
Candidate	Party		Votes	%	Votes	%
Pascal Terrasse	Socialist Party	PS	17,553	37.68%	24,099	54.45%
Michel Valla	Union for a Popular Movement	UMP	16,034	34.42%	20,159	45.55%
Jean Joel Vanhove	National Front	FN	5,171	11.10%		
Elsa Cayron	Communist	COM	2,410	5.17%		
Marie-Christine Git	Hunting, Fishing, Nature, Traditions	CPNT	1,428	3.07%		
Stephane Oriol	The Greens	VEC	1,039	2.23%		
Cecile Moulain	Revolutionary Communist League	LCR	814	1.75%		
Francis Jean	Far Right	EXD	540	1.16%		
Genevieve Suppa	Divers	DIV	381	0.82%		
Christian Prada	Workers’ Struggle	LO	349	0.75%		
Catherine Martin	National Republican Movement	MNR	343	0.74%		
Nicole Juven	Movement for France	MPF	271	0.58%		
Herve Salone	Ecologist	ECO	127	0.27%		
Marie-Ange Revire	Miscellaneous Right	DVD	124	0.27%		
Total			46,584	100%	44,258	100%
Registered voters			68,981		68,975	
Blank/Void ballots			913	1.92%	1,505	3.29%
Turnout			47,497	68.86%	45,763	66.35%
Abstentions			21,484	31.14%	23,212	33.65%
Result					PS HOLD	

=== 1997 ===
Legislative Election 1997: Ardèche's 1st constituency
Party	Candidate	Votes	%	±%
PS	Pascal Terrasse	13,859	31.88	
UDF	Amédée Imbert	10,188	23.44	
PCF	Robert Cotta	6,347	14.60	
FN	Jean-Joël Vanhove	6,157	14.16	
UDF	Christian Lavis*	2,876	6.62	
LV	Jacques Jung	1,754	4.03	
MPF	Paul Bossan	1,149	2.64	
GE	Jean-Philippe Smadja	1,140	2.62	
Turnout		45,789	70.01	
2nd round result
PS	Pascal Terrasse	27,377	59.23	
UDF	Amédée Imbert	18,843	40.77	
Turnout		49,374	75.50	
PS gain from UDF				

*UDF dissident

== Sources ==
- French Interior Ministry results website: "Résultats électoraux officiels en France" (in French).
