= Jura's 2nd constituency =

Constituency of the National Assembly of France

2nd constituency of Jura
- inline Constituency of the National Assembly of France

- Constituency in Department

- Jura in France
- Deputy: Marie-Christine Dalloz; LR
- Department: Jura
- Cantons: Les Bouchoux, Champagnole, Clairvaux-les-Lacs, Moirans-en-Montagne, Morez, Nozeroy, Les Planches-en-Montagne, Saint-Claude, Saint-Laurent-en-Grandvaux
- Registered voters: 81,550

The 2nd constituency of Jura is a French legislative constituency in the Jura département.

== Description ==
The 2nd constituency of Jura covers the south east of the department. With a thinly spread population it reaches into the Jura Mountains from the centre of the department.

The seat is held by the conservative LR and has been in the hands of the right since 1988.

== Deputies ==
Election	Member	Party
1988	Jean Charroppin	RPR
1993	Jean Charroppin	RPR
1997	Jean Charroppin	RPR
2002	Jean Charroppin	UMP
2007	Marie-Christine Dalloz	UMP
2012	Marie-Christine Dalloz	UMP
2017	Marie-Christine Dalloz	LR
2022	Marie-Christine Dalloz	LR
2024	Marie-Christine Dalloz	LR

== Election results ==
=== 2025 by-election ===
The by-election was held on 30 March and 6 April 2025.

Candidate	Party	First round			Second round		
Candidate	Party	Votes	%	+/–	Votes	%	+/–
Marie-Christine Dalloz	LR		54.10				
Gilles Guichon	RN		22.76				
Evelyne Ternant	PCF		16.06				
Emmanuel Michaud	UDR		5.87				
Christian Marchet	LO		1.20				
Votes							

=== 2024 ===
Candidate	Party	Alliance	First round			Second round		
Candidate	Party	Alliance	Votes	%	+/–	Votes	%	+/–
Marie-Christine Dalloz	LR	UDC	14,507	38.59	+8.56	23,361	65.02	+2.92
Thierry Mosca	RN		12,315	32.76	+15.70	12,568	34.98	new
Evelyne Ternant	PCF	NFP	9,303	24.75	+0.24	withdrew		
Patrick Lancon	DIV		694	1.85	new			
André Bigot	REC		390	1.04	-1.57			
Christian Marchet	LO		386	1.03	+0.17			
Votes			37,595	100.00		35,929	100.00	
Valid votes			37,595	97.10	-0.81	35,929	94.28	+0.04
Blank votes			766	1.98	+0.46	1,654	4.34	+0.41
Null votes			356	0.92	+0.36	524	1.38	-0.44
Turnout			38,717	69.48	+19.82	38,107	68.43	+21.34
Abstentions			17,006	30.52	-19.82	17,584	31.57	-21.34
Registered voters			55,723			55,691		
Result			LR HOLD					

=== 2022 ===
Legislative Election 2022: Jura's 2nd constituency
Party	Candidate	Votes	%	±%
LR (UDC)	Marie-Christine Dalloz	8,147	30.03	+0.86
PCF (NUPÉS)	Evelyne Ternant	6,651	24.51	+6.59
PRV (Ensemble)	Delphine Gallois Jobez	5,047	18.60	−8.64
RN	Garance Houthoofd	4,628	17.06	+5.38
R!	Jérôme Linda	1,122	4.14	N/A
REC	Nicolas De Keersmacker	709	2.61	N/A
DLF (RPR)	Nathalie Desseigne	596	2.20	N/A
LO	Christian Marchet	232	0.86	+0.30
DVD	Louis Marino	1	0.00	N/A
Turnout		27,133	49.66	−1.05
2nd round result
LR (UDC)	Marie-Christine Dalloz	15,380	62.10	+4.93
PCF (NUPÉS)	Evelyne Ternant	9,386	37.90	N/A
Turnout		24,766	47.09	+1.52
LR hold				

=== 2017 ===
Candidate	Label	First round		Second round	
Candidate	Label	Votes	%	Votes	%
Marie-Christine Dalloz	LR	8,014	29.17	13,063	57.17
Anne Prost-Grosjean	MoDem	7,482	27.24	9,785	42.83
Julie Lançon	FI	3,323	12.10		
Nathalie Desseigne	FN	3,209	11.68		
Jean-Louis Millet	DVD	1,573	5.73		
Christophe Masson	ECO	1,545	5.62		
Jean-Daniel Maire	DVG	749	2.73		
Francisque Bailly-Cochet	DIV	551	2.01		
Dominique Biichlé	ECO	308	1.12		
Dominique Oudin	ECO	266	0.97		
Isabelle Marchal	EXG	155	0.56		
Larbi Laabid	DIV	151	0.55		
Frédéric Jaillet	DIV	145	0.53		
Votes		27,471	100.00	22,848	100.00
Valid votes		27,471	98.10	22,848	90.79
Blank votes		377	1.35	1,710	6.80
Null votes		156	0.56	607	2.41
Turnout		28,004	50.71	25,165	45.57
Abstentions		27,223	49.29	30,061	54.43
Registered voters		55,227		55,226	
Source: Ministry of the Interior

=== 2012 ===
2012 legislative election in Jura's 2nd constituency
Candidate	Party	First round		Second round	
Candidate	Party	Votes	%	Votes	%
Marie-Christine Dalloz	UMP	12,248	37.15%	16,915	54.61%
Raphaël Perrin	PS	8,496	25.77%	14,060	45.39%
Francis Lahaut	FG	3,893	11.81%		
Josette Devarieux	FN	3,549	10.76%		
François Godin	PR	2,989	9.06%		
Dominique Biichlé	MEI	1,034	3.14%		
Sylvie Defilhes	DLR	422	1.28%		
Alain Lorenzati	NPA	197	0.60%		
Isabelle Marchal	LO	145	0.44%		
Valid votes		32,973	98.57%	30,974	96.99%
Spoilt and null votes		478	1.43%	962	3.01%
Votes cast / turnout		33,451	60.96%	31,936	58.09%
Abstentions		21,423	39.04%	23,042	41.91%
Registered voters		54,874	100.00%	54,978	100.00%

=== 2007 ===
Legislative Election 2007: Jura's 2nd constituency
Party	Candidate	Votes	%	±%
UMP	Marie-Christine Dalloz	7,293	22.14	
UMP	Yves Garnier*	4,864	14.77	
DVD	François Godin	3,483	10.57	
MPF	Jean-Louis Millet	3,381	10.27	
DVG	Elisabeth Boyer	3,086	9.37	
DVG	Jean-Louis Duprez	3,037	9.22	
PCF	Francis Lahaut	2,737	8.31	
MoDem	Yoann Pimentel Sanchez	1,269	3.85	
LV	Gérard Roy	1,043	3.17	
FN	Josette Devarieux	1,040	3.16	
Others	N/A	1,704	-	
Turnout		33,598	60.50	
2nd round result
UMP	Marie-Christine Dalloz	13,621	65.39	
UMP	Yves Garnier*	7,208	34.61	
Turnout		26,093	46.99	
UMP hold				

* UMP dissident

=== 2002 ===
Legislative Election 2002: Jura's 2nd constituency
Party	Candidate	Votes	%	±%
UMP	Jean Charroppin	12,730	38.26	
DVG	Denis Vuillermoz	9,189	27.62	
FN	Eliane Vuillemin	4,044	12.16	
MPF	Jean-Louis Millet	2,509	7.54	
PCF	Francis Lahaut	1,645	4.94	
MEI	Michel Dealberto	817	2.46	
Others	N/A	3,151	-	
Turnout		34,154	63.57	
2nd round result
UMP	Jean Charroppin	16,213	54.40	
DVG	Denis Vuillermoz	13,588	45.60	
Turnout		31,266	58.20	
UMP hold				

=== 1997 ===
Legislative Election 1997: Jura's 2nd constituency
Party	Candidate	Votes	%	±%
RPR	Jean Charroppin	9,966	30.64	
DVG	Denis Vuillermoz	6,745	20.74	
FN	René Bernard	5,595	17.20	
PCF	Francis Lahaut	3,400	10.45	
LDI	Jean-Louis Millet	2,326	7.15	
DVE	Michel Moreau	2,121	6.52	
LV	Gérard Roy	1,594	4.90	
MDC	Line Chanard	780	2.40	
Turnout		34,791	68.55	
2nd round result
RPR	Jean Charroppin	17,795	51.81	
DVG	Denis Vuillermoz	16,552	48.19	
Turnout		37,108	73.12	
RPR hold				

== Sources ==
Official results of French elections from 2002: "Résultats électoraux officiels en France" (in French).
