= Val-de-Marne's 8th constituency =

Constituency of the National Assembly of France

8th constituency of Val-de-Marne
- inline Constituency of the National Assembly of France

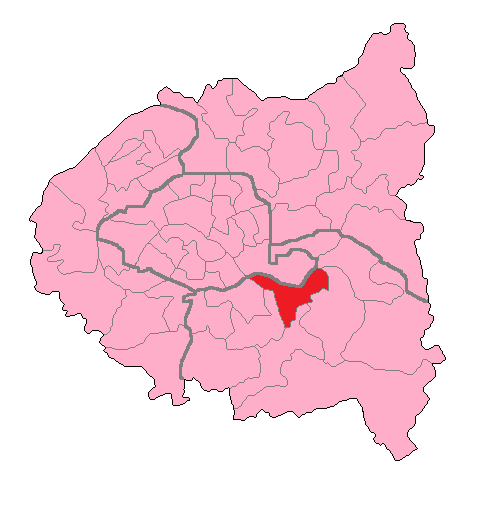
- Val-de-Marne's 8th Constituency shown within Île-de-France
- Deputy: Michel Herbillon; LR
- Department: Val-de-Marne
- Cantons: Charenton-le-Pont - Joinville-le-Pont - Maisons-Alfort-Nord - Maisons-Alfort-Sud
- Registered voters: 73,789

The 8th constituency of Val-de-Marne is a French legislative constituency in the Val-de-Marne département.

== Description ==
The 8th constituency of Val-de-Marne sits in the north of the department, on the border with Paris and just south of the Bois de Vincennes. The constituency was enlarged as a result of the 2010 redistricting of French legislative constituencies to include the canton of Joinville-le-Pont.

The seat has returned conservative deputies at every election since 1988, since 1997 it has been held by Michel Herbillon the long serving mayor of Maisons-Alfort.

== Historic Representation ==
Election	Member	Party
1967	Jean-Marie Poirier	UDR
1968	Jean-Marie Poirier	UDR
1973	Maxime Kalinsky	PCF
1978	Maxime Kalinsky	PCF
1981	Paulette Nevoux	PS
1986	Proportional representation – no election by constituency	
1988	Alain Griotteray	UDF
1993	Alain Griotteray	UDF
1997	Michel Herbillon	DL
2002	Michel Herbillon	UMP
2007	Michel Herbillon	UMP
2012	Michel Herbillon	UMP
2017	Michel Herbillon	LR
2022	Michel Herbillon	LR

== Election results ==
=== 2024 ===
Candidate	Party	Alliance	First round			Second round		
Candidate	Party	Alliance	Votes	%	+/–	Votes	%	+/–
Michel Herbillon	LR		24,722	44.13	+6.65	30,568	58.44	
Joao Martins Pereira	PS	NFP	20,658	36.88	+8.72	21,743	41.56	
Raphaël Turpin	RN		9,085	16.22	+10.90			
Olivier Buclin	REC		1,009	1.80	-2.29			
Amandine Cheyns	LO		546	0.97	+0.39			
Valid votes			56,020	98.66	-0.16	52,311	97.31	
Blank votes			528	0.93	+0.08	1,037	1.93	
Null votes			230	0.41	+0.08	409	0.76	
Turnout			56,778	73.70	+19.47	53,757	69.80	
Abstentions			20,262	26.30	-19.47	23,263	30.20	
Registered voters			77,040			77,020		
Source: Ministry of the Interior, Le Monde
Result						LR HOLD		

=== 2022 ===
Legislative Election 2022: Val-de-Marne's 8th constituency
Party	Candidate	Votes	%	±%
LR (UDC)	Michel Herbillon	15,767	37.48	+0.97
LFI (NUPÉS)	Erik Pages	11,847	28.16	+8.92
LREM (Ensemble)	Emmanuelle Wargon	7,964	18.93	−14.80
RN	Elisabeth Vuillard	2,240	5.32	+0.63
REC	Olivier Buclin	1,719	4.09	N/A
DVE	Alexandra Scotto	933	2.22	N/A
Others	N/A	1,601		
Turnout		42,574	54.23	−1.09
2nd round result
LR (UDC)	Michel Herbillon	25,641	63.27	+5.28
LFI (NUPÉS)	Erik Pages	14,884	36.73	N/A
Turnout		40,525	53.38	+3.77
LR hold				

=== 2017 ===
Legislative Election 2017: Val-de-Marne's 8th constituency
Party	Candidate	Votes	%	±%
LR	Michel Herbillon	15,348	36.51	−10.47
LREM	Jennifer Douieb-Nahon	14,181	33.73	N/A
LFI	Renaud Pequignot	4,187	9.96	N/A
EELV	Remi Houley	1,980	4.71	+1.74
FN	Marie-Odile Enon	1,970	4.69	−2.30
PS	Sophie Gallais	1,922	4.57	−27.83
Others	N/A	2,450		
Turnout		42,459	55.32	−4.36
2nd round result
LR	Michel Herbillon	20,706	57.99	+1.59
LREM	Jennifer Douieb-Nahon	15,001	42.01	N/A
Turnout		38,073	49.61	−6.94
LR hold		Swing		

=== 2012 ===
Legislative Election 2012: Val-de-Marne's 8th constituency
Party	Candidate	Votes	%	±%
UMP	Michel Herbillon	20,689	46.98	−6.25
PS	Patricia Richard	14,266	32.40	+9.57
FN	Pierrette Gracieux	3,077	6.99	+3.38
FG	Fatima Senechal-Hamami	2,411	5.48	+3.34
EELV	Marie-Amélie Bertin	1,308	2.97	+0.15
MoDem	Nicole Martin	936	2.13	−8.19
Others	N/A	1,059		
Turnout		44,035	59.68	−3.49
2nd round result
UMP	Michel Herbillon	23,536	56.40	N/A
PS	Patricia Richard	18,192	43.60	N/A
Turnout		41,728	56.55	N/A
UMP hold				

=== 2007 ===
Legislative Election 2007: Val-de-Marne's 8th constituency
Party	Candidate	Votes	%	±%
UMP	Michel Herbillon	20,502	53.23	−2.49
PS	Eve Durquety	8,792	22.83	−0.86
MoDem	Marie-Hélène Rougeron	3,973	10.32	N/A
FN	Marie-Celeste Bruneaut	1,390	3.61	−5.08
LV	Isabelle Agier	1,087	2.82	−0.91
Far left	Bila Traore	857	2.23	N/A
PCF	Malika Zediri	825	2.14	+0.13
Others	N/A	1,087		
Turnout		38,917	63.17	−4.43
UMP hold				

=== 2002 ===
Legislative Election 2002: Val-de-Marne's 8th constituency
Party	Candidate	Votes	%	±%
UMP	Michel Herbillon	20,360	55.72	N/A
PS	Magali Vergnet	8,655	23.69	+1.78
FN	Philippe Jallade	3,177	8.69	−6.21
LV	Helena Fanartzis	1,364	3.73	−0.90
PCF	Madeleine Lagane	733	2.01	−2.76
Others	N/A	2,251		
Turnout		37,019	67.60	+0.17
UMP gain from UDF				

=== 1997 ===
Legislative Election 1997: Val-de-Marne's 8th constituency
Party	Candidate	Votes	%	±%
UDF	Michel Herbillon	9,126	26.24	
PS	Raymond Riquier	7,620	21.91	
UDF	Alain Griotteray*	6,552	18.84	
FN	Philippe Olivier	5,183	14.90	
PCF	Fabienne Bruneau	1,659	4.77	
LV	Héléna Fanartzis	1,611	4.63	
LO	Annie Rieupet	889	2.56	
Others	N/A	2,135		
Turnout		35,924	67.43	
2nd round result
UDF	Michel Herbillon	19,495	56.48	
PS	Raymond Riquier	15,022	43.52	
Turnout		36,645	68.78	
UDF hold				

* UDF dissident

== Sources ==
Official results of French elections from 2002: "Résultats électoraux officiels en France" (in French).
