= List of French senators (2008–2011) =

List by departments of the senators of Senate of France (2008-2011) elected in the various renewals.

== List of senators by departments ==
Department	Constituency	Name	Party
Ain (01)	1	Jacques Berthou	PS
Ain (01)	2	Sylvie Goy-Chavent	UMP
Ain (01)	3	Rachel Mazuir	PS
Aisne (02)	1	Pierre André	UMP
Aisne (02)	2	Yves Daudigny	PS
Aisne (02)	3	Antoine Lefebvre	UMP
Allier (03)	1	Gérard Dériot	UMP
Allier (03)	2	Mireille Schurch	PCF
Alpes-de-Haute-Provence (04)	1	Claude Domeizel	PS
Hautes-Alpes (05)	1	Pierre Bernard-Reymond	UMP
Alpes-Maritimes (06)	1	Marc Daunis	PS
Alpes-Maritimes (06)	2	Colette Giudicelli	UMP
Alpes-Maritimes (06)	3	Jean-Pierre Leleux	UMP
Alpes-Maritimes (06)	4	Louis Nègre	UMP
Alpes-Maritimes (06)	5	René Vestri	UMP
Ardèche (07)	1	Yves Chastan	PS
Ardèche (07)	2	Michel Teston	PS
Ardennes (08)	1	Benoît Huré	UMP
Ardennes (08)	2	Marc Laménie	UMP
Ariège (09)	1	Jean-Pierre Bel	PS
Aube (10)	1	Philippe Adnot	DVD
Aube (10)	2	Yann Gaillard	UMP
Aude (11)	1	Roland Courteau	PS
Aude (11)	2	Marcel Rainaud	PS
Aveyron (12)	1	Anne-Marie Escoffier	PRG
Aveyron (12)	2	Alain Fauconnier	PS
Bouches-du-Rhône (13)	1	Serge Andreoni	PS
Bouches-du-Rhône (13)	2	Jean-Claude Gaudin	UMP
Bouches-du-Rhône (13)	3	Samia Ghali	PS
Bouches-du-Rhône (13)	4	Bruno Gilles	UMP
Bouches-du-Rhône (13)	5	Jean-Noël Guérini	PS
Bouches-du-Rhône (13)	6	Sophie Joissains	UMP
Bouches-du-Rhône (13)	7	Isabelle Pasquet	PCF
Bouches-du-Rhône (13)	8	Roland Povinelli	PS
Calvados (14)	1	Ambroise Dupont	UMP
Calvados (14)	2	Jean-Léonce Dupont	NC
Calvados (14)	3	René Garrec	UMP
Cantal (15)	1	Pierre Jarlier	UMP
Cantal (15)	2	Jacques Mézard	PRG
Charente (16)	1	Nicole Bonnefoy	PS
Charente (16)	2	Michel Boutant	PS
Charente-Maritime (17)	1	Claude Belot	UMP
Charente-Maritime (17)	2	Michel Doublet	UMP
Charente-Maritime (17)	3	Daniel Laurent	UMP
Cher (18)	1	François Pillet	UMP
Cher (18)	2	Rémy Pointereau	UMP
Corrèze (19)	1	Bernadette Bourzai	PS
Corrèze (19)	2	René Teulade	PS
Corse-du-Sud (2A)	1	Nicolas Alfonsi	PRG
Haute-Corse (2B)	1	François Vendasi	PRG
Côte-d'Or (21)	1	Alain Houpert	UMP
Côte-d'Or (21)	2	François Patriat	PS
Côte-d'Or (21)	3	François Rebsamen	PS
Côtes-d'Armor (22)	1	Yannick Botrel	PS
Côtes-d'Armor (22)	2	Jacqueline Chevé	PS
Côtes-d'Armor (22)	3	Gérard Le Cam	PCF
Creuse (23)	1	André Lejeune	PS
Creuse (23)	2	Jean-Jacques Lozach	PS
Dordogne (24)	1	Claude Bérit-Débat	PS
Dordogne (24)	2	Bernard Cazeau	PS
Doubs (25)	1	Martial Bourquin	PS
Doubs (25)	2	Jean-François Humbert	UMP
Doubs (25)	3	Claude Jeannerot	PS
Drôme (26)	1	Jean Besson	PS
Drôme (26)	2	Didier Guillaume	PS
Drôme (26)	3	Bernard Piras	PS
Eure (27)	1	Joël Bourdin	UMP
Eure (27)	2	Hervé Maurey	NC
Eure (27)	3	Ladislas Poniatowski	UMP
Eure-et-Loir (28)	1	Joël Billard	UMP
Eure-et-Loir (28)	2	Gérard Cornu	UMP
Eure-et-Loir (28)	3	Albéric de Montgolfier	UMP
Finistère (29)	1	Maryvonne Blondin	PS
Finistère (29)	2	Jean-Luc Fichet	PS
Finistère (29)	3	François Marc	PS
Finistère (29)	4	Philippe Paul	UMP
Gard (30)	1	Jean-Paul Fournier	UMP
Gard (30)	2	Françoise Laurent-Perrigot	PS
Gard (30)	3	Simon Sutour	PS
Haute-Garonne (31)	1	Bertrand Auban	PS
Haute-Garonne (31)	2	Alain Chatillon	UMP
Haute-Garonne (31)	3	Françoise Laborde	PRG
Haute-Garonne (31)	4	Jean-Jacques Mirassou	PS
Haute-Garonne (31)	5	Jean-Pierre Plancade	PS
Gers (32)	1	Aymeri de Montesquiou	UMP
Gers (32)	2	Raymond Vall	PRG
Gironde (33)	1	Alain Anziani	PS
Gironde (33)	2	Françoise Cartron	PS
Gironde (33)	3	Gérard César	UMP
Gironde (33)	4	Marie-Hélène des Esgaulx	UMP
Gironde (33)	5	Philippe Madrelle	PS
Gironde (33)	6	Xavier Pintat	UMP
Hérault (34)	1	Marie-Thérèse Bruguière	UMP
Hérault (34)	2	Raymond Couderc	UMP
Hérault (34)	3	Robert Navarro	PS
Hérault (34)	4	Robert Tropéano	DVG
Ille-et-Vilaine (35)	1	Dominique de Legge	UMP
Ille-et-Vilaine (35)	2	Edmond Hervé	PS
Ille-et-Vilaine (35)	3	Virginie Klès	PS
Ille-et-Vilaine (35)	4	Jacky Le Menn	PS
Indre (36)	1	Michel Sapin	PS
Indre (36)	2	Nicolas Forissier	UMP
Indre (36)	3	Jean-Paul Chanteguet	PS
Indre-et-Loire (37)	1	Jean-Patrick Gille	PS
Indre-et-Loire (37)	2	Claude Greff	UMP
Indre-et-Loire (37)	3	Marisol Touraine	PS
Indre-et-Loire (37)	4	Hervé Novelli	UMP
Indre-et-Loire (37)	5	Philippe Briand	UMP
Isère (38)	1	Geneviève Fioraso	PS
Isère (38)	2	Michel Issindou	PS
Isère (38)	3	Michel Destot	PS
Isère (38)	4	Didier Migaud	PS
Isère (38)	5	François Brottes	PS
Isère (38)	6	Alain Moyne-Bressand	UMP
Isère (38)	7	Georges Colombier	UMP
Isère (38)	8	Jacques Remiller	UMP
Isère (38)	9	André Vallini	PS
Jura (39)	1	Jacques Pélissard	UMP
Jura (39)	2	Marie-Christine Dalloz	UMP
Jura (39)	3	Jean-Marie Sermier	UMP
Landes (40)	1	Alain Vidalies	PS
Landes (40)	2	Jean-Pierre Dufau	PS
Landes (40)	3	Henri Emmanuelli	PS
Loir-et-Cher (41)	1	Nicolas Perruchot	NC
Loir-et-Cher (41)	2	Patrice Martin-Lalande	UMP
Loir-et-Cher (41)	3	Maurice Leroy	NC
Loire (42)	1	Régis Juanico	PS
Loire (42)	2	Jean-Louis Gagnaire	PS
Loire (42)	3	François Rochebloine	NC
Loire (42)	4	Dino Cinieri	PCD
Loire (42)	5	Yves Nicolin	UMP
Loire (42)	6	Pascal Clément	UMP
Loire (42)	7	Jean-François Chossy	PCD
Haute-Loire (43)	1	Laurent Wauquiez	UMP
Haute-Loire (43)	2	Jean Proriol	UMP
Loire-Atlantique (44)	1	François de Rugy	Les Verts
Loire-Atlantique (44)	2	Marie-Françoise Clergeau	PS
Loire-Atlantique (44)	3	Jean-Marc Ayrault	PS
Loire-Atlantique (44)	4	Dominique Raimbourg	PS
Loire-Atlantique (44)	5	Michel Ménard	PS
Loire-Atlantique (44)	6	Michel Hunault	NC
Loire-Atlantique (44)	7	Christophe Priou	UMP
Loire-Atlantique (44)	8	Marie-Odile Bouillé	PS
Loire-Atlantique (44)	9	Philippe Boënnec	UMP
Loire-Atlantique (44)	10	Serge Poignant	UMP
Loiret (45)	1	Olivier Carré	UMP
Loiret (45)	2	Serge Grouard	UMP
Loiret (45)	3	Jean-Louis Bernard	UMP
Loiret (45)	4	Jean-Pierre Door	UMP
Loiret (45)	5	Jean-Paul Charié	UMP
Lot (46)	1	Dominique Orliac	PRG
Lot (46)	2	Jean Launay	PS
Lot-et-Garonne (47)	1	Jean Dionis du Séjour	NC
Lot-et-Garonne (47)	2	Michel Diefenbacher	UMP
Lot-et-Garonne (47)	3	Jérôme Cahuzac	PS
Lozère (48)	1	Francis Saint-Léger	UMP
Lozère (48)	2	Pierre Morel-A-L'Huissier	UMP
Maine-et-Loire (49)	1	Roselyne Bachelot-Narquin	UMP
Maine-et-Loire (49)	2	Marc Goua	PS
Maine-et-Loire (49)	3	Jean-Charles Taugourdeau	UMP
Maine-et-Loire (49)	4	Michel Piron	UMP
Maine-et-Loire (49)	5	Gilles Bourdouleix	CNIP
Maine-et-Loire (49)	6	Hervé de Charette	UMP
Maine-et-Loire (49)	7	Marc Laffineur	UMP
Manche (50)	1	Philippe Gosselin	UMP
Manche (50)	2	Guénhaël Huet	UMP
Manche (50)	3	Alain Cousin	UMP
Manche (50)	4	Claude Gatignol	UMP
Manche (50)	5	Bernard Cazeneuve	PS
Marne (51)	1	Renaud Dutreil	UMP
Marne (51)	2	Catherine Vautrin	UMP
Marne (51)	3	Jean-Claude Thomas	UMP
Marne (51)	4	Benoist Apparu	UMP
Marne (51)	5	Charles de Courson	NC
Marne (51)	6	Philippe-Armand Martin	UMP
Haute-Marne (52)	1	Luc Chatel	UMP
Haute-Marne (52)	2	François Cornut-Gentille	UMP
Mayenne (53)	1	Guillaume Garot	PS
Mayenne (53)	2	Marc Bernier	UMP
Mayenne (53)	3	Yannick Favennec	UMP
Meurthe-et-Moselle (54)	1	Laurent Hénart	UMP
Meurthe-et-Moselle (54)	2	Hervé Féron	PS
Meurthe-et-Moselle (54)	3	Valérie Rosso-Debord	UMP
Meurthe-et-Moselle (54)	4	Jacques Lamblin	UMP
Meurthe-et-Moselle (54)	5	Nadine Morano	UMP
Meurthe-et-Moselle (54)	6	Jean-Yves Le Déaut	PS
Meurthe-et-Moselle (54)	7	Christian Eckert	PS
Meuse (55)	1	Bertrand Pancher	UMP
Meuse (55)	2	Jean-Louis Dumont	PS
Morbihan (56)	1	François Goulard	UMP
Morbihan (56)	2	Michel Grall	UMP
Morbihan (56)	3	Gérard Lorgeoux	UMP
Morbihan (56)	4	Loïc Bouvard	UMP
Morbihan (56)	5	Françoise Olivier-Coupeau	PS
Morbihan (56)	6	Jacques Le Nay	UMP
Moselle (57)	1	François Grosdidier	UMP
Moselle (57)	2	Denis Jacquat	UMP
Moselle (57)	3	Marie-Jo Zimmermann	UMP
Moselle (57)	4	Alain Marty	UMP
Moselle (57)	5	Céleste Lett	UMP
Moselle (57)	6	Pierre Lang	UMP
Moselle (57)	7	André Wojciechowski	UMP
Moselle (57)	8	Aurélie Filippetti	PS
Moselle (57)	9	Jean-Marie Demange	UMP
Moselle (57)	10	Michel Liebgott	PS
Nièvre (58)	1	Martine Carrillon-Couvreur	PS
Nièvre (58)	2	Gaëtan Gorce	PS
Nièvre (58)	3	Christian Paul	PS
Nord (59)	1	Bernard Roman	PS
Nord (59)	2	Bernard Derosier	PS
Nord (59)	3	Alain Cacheux	PS
Nord (59)	4	Marc-Philippe Daubresse	UMP
Nord (59)	5	Sébastien Huyghe	UMP
Nord (59)	6	Thierry Lazaro	UMP
Nord (59)	7	Francis Vercamer	NC
Nord (59)	8	Dominique Baert	PS
Nord (59)	9	Bernard Gérard	UMP
Nord (59)	10	Christian Vanneste	UMP
Nord (59)	11	Yves Durand	PS
Nord (59)	12	Christian Hutin	MRC
Nord (59)	13	Michel Delebarre	PS
Nord (59)	14	Jean-Pierre Decool	UMP
Nord (59)	15	Françoise Hostalier	UMP
Nord (59)	16	Jean-Jacques Candelier	PCF
Nord (59)	17	Marc Dolez	PS
Nord (59)	18	François-Xavier Villain	UMP
Nord (59)	19	Patrick Roy	PS
Nord (59)	20	Alain Bocquet	PCF
Nord (59)	21	Jean-Louis Borloo	UMP
Nord (59)	22	Christian Bataille	PS
Nord (59)	23	Christine Marin	UMP
Nord (59)	24	Jean-Luc Pérat	PS
Oise (60)	1	Olivier Dassault	UMP
Oise (60)	2	Jean-François Mancel	UMP
Oise (60)	3	Michel Françaix	PS
Oise (60)	4	Eric Woerth	UMP
Oise (60)	5	Lucien Degauchy	UMP
Oise (60)	6	François-Michel Gonnot	UMP
Oise (60)	7	Edouard Courtial	UMP
Orne (61)	1	Yves Deniaud	UMP
Orne (61)	2	Jean-Claude Lenoir	UMP
Orne (61)	3	Sylvia Bassot	UMP
Pas-de-Calais (62)	1	Jacqueline Maquet	PS
Pas-de-Calais (62)	2	Catherine Génisson	PS
Pas-de-Calais (62)	3	Jean-Claude Leroy	PS
Pas-de-Calais (62)	4	Daniel Fasquelle	UMP
Pas-de-Calais (62)	5	Frédéric Cuvillier	PS
Pas-de-Calais (62)	6	Jack Lang	PS
Pas-de-Calais (62)	7	Gilles Cocquempot	PS
Pas-de-Calais (62)	8	Michel Lefait	PS
Pas-de-Calais (62)	9	André Flajolet	UMP
Pas-de-Calais (62)	10	Serge Janquin	PS
Pas-de-Calais (62)	11	Odette Duriez	PS
Pas-de-Calais (62)	12	Jean-Pierre Kucheida	PS
Pas-de-Calais (62)	13	Guy Delcourt	PS
Pas-de-Calais (62)	14	Albert Facon	PS
Puy-de-Dôme (63)	1	Odile Saugues	PS
Puy-de-Dôme (63)	2	Alain Néri	PS
Puy-de-Dôme (63)	3	Louis Giscard d'Estaing	UMP
Puy-de-Dôme (63)	4	Jean-Paul Bacquet	PS
Puy-de-Dôme (63)	5	André Chassaigne	PCF
Puy-de-Dôme (63)	6	Jean Michel	PS
Pyrénées-Atlantiques (64)	1	Martine Lignières-Cassou	PS
Pyrénées-Atlantiques (64)	2	François Bayrou	MoDem
Pyrénées-Atlantiques (64)	3	David Habib	PS
Pyrénées-Atlantiques (64)	4	Jean Lassalle	MoDem
Pyrénées-Atlantiques (64)	5	Jean Grenet	UMP
Pyrénées-Atlantiques (64)	6	Michèle Alliot-Marie	UMP
Hautes-Pyrénées (65)	1	Pierre Forgues	PS
Hautes-Pyrénées (65)	2	Chantal Robin-Rodrigo	PRG
Hautes-Pyrénées (65)	3	Jean Glavany	PS
Pyrénées-Orientales (66)	1	Daniel Mach	UMP
Pyrénées-Orientales (66)	2	Arlette Franco	UMP
Pyrénées-Orientales (66)	3	François Calvet	UMP
Pyrénées-Orientales (66)	4	Jacqueline Irles	UMP
Bas-Rhin (67)	1	Armand Jung	PS
Bas-Rhin (67)	2	Jean-Philippe Maurer	UMP
Bas-Rhin (67)	3	André Schneider	UMP
Bas-Rhin (67)	4	Yves Bur	UMP
Bas-Rhin (67)	5	Antoine Herth	UMP
Bas-Rhin (67)	6	Alain Ferry	UMP
Bas-Rhin (67)	7	Emile Blessig	UMP
Bas-Rhin (67)	8	Frédéric Reiss	UMP
Bas-Rhin (67)	9	François Loos	UMP
Haut-Rhin (68)	1	Eric Straumann	UMP
Haut-Rhin (68)	2	Jean-Louis Christ	UMP
Haut-Rhin (68)	3	Jean-Luc Reitzer	UMP
Haut-Rhin (68)	4	Jean Ueberschlag	UMP
Haut-Rhin (68)	5	Arlette Grosskost	UMP
Haut-Rhin (68)	6	Francis Hillmeyer	NC
Haut-Rhin (68)	7	Michel Sordi	UMP
Rhône (69)	1	Michel Havard	UMP
Rhône (69)	2	Pierre-Alain Muet	PS
Rhône (69)	3	Jean-Louis Touraine	PS
Rhône (69)	4	Dominique Perben	UMP
Rhône (69)	5	Philippe Cochet	UMP
Rhône (69)	6	Pascale Crozon	PS
Rhône (69)	7	Jean-Jack Queyranne	PS
Rhône (69)	8	Patrice Verchère	UMP
Rhône (69)	9	Bernard Perrut	UMP
Rhône (69)	10	Christophe Guilloteau	UMP
Rhône (69)	11	Georges Fenech	UMP
Rhône (69)	12	Michel Terrot	UMP
Rhône (69)	13	Philippe Meunier	UMP
Rhône (69)	14	André Gérin	PCF
Haute-Saône (70)	1	Alain Joyandet	UMP
Haute-Saône (70)	2	Jean-Michel Villaumé	PS
Haute-Saône (70)	3	Michel Raison	UMP
Saône-et-Loire (71)	1	Gérard Voisin	UMP
Saône-et-Loire (71)	2	Jean-Marc Nesme	UMP
Saône-et-Loire (71)	3	Jean-Paul Anciaux	UMP
Saône-et-Loire (71)	4	Didier Mathus	PS
Saône-et-Loire (71)	5	Christophe Sirugue	PS
Saône-et-Loire (71)	6	Arnaud Montebourg	PS
Sarthe (72)	1	Fabienne Labrette-Ménager	UMP
Sarthe (72)	2	Marietta Karamanli	PS
Sarthe (72)	3	Béatrice Pavy	UMP
Sarthe (72)	4	François Fillon	UMP
Sarthe (72)	5	Dominique Le Mener	UMP
Savoie (73)	1	Dominique Dord	UMP
Savoie (73)	2	Hervé Gaymard	UMP
Savoie (73)	3	Michel Bouvard	UMP
Haute-Savoie (74)	1	Bernard Accoyer	UMP
Haute-Savoie (74)	2	Lionel Tardy	UMP
Haute-Savoie (74)	3	Martial Saddier	UMP
Haute-Savoie (74)	4	Claude Birraux	UMP
Haute-Savoie (74)	5	Marc Francina	UMP
Paris (75)	1	Martine Billard	Les Verts
Paris (75)	2	Jean Tiberi	UMP
Paris (75)	3	Martine Aurillac	UMP
Paris (75)	4	Pierre Lellouche	UMP
Paris (75)	5	Tony Dreyfus	PS
Paris (75)	6	Danièle Hoffman-Rispal	PS
Paris (75)	7	Patrick Bloche	PS
Paris (75)	8	Sandrine Mazetier	PS
Paris (75)	9	Jean-Marie Le Guen	PS
Paris (75)	10	Serge Blisko	PS
Paris (75)	11	Yves Cochet	Les Verts
Paris (75)	12	Philippe Goujon	UMP
Paris (75)	13	Jean-François Lamour	UMP
Paris (75)	14	Claude Goasguen	UMP
Paris (75)	15	Bernard Debré	UMP
Paris (75)	16	Françoise de Panafieu	UMP
Paris (75)	17	Annick Lepetit	PS
Paris (75)	18	Christophe Caresche	PS
Paris (75)	19	Daniel Vaillant	PS
Paris (75)	20	Jean-Christophe Cambadélis	PS
Paris (75)	21	George Pau-Langevin	PS
Seine-Maritime (76)	1	Valérie Fourneyron	PS
Seine-Maritime (76)	2	Françoise Guégot	UMP
Seine-Maritime (76)	3	Pierre Bourguignon	PS
Seine-Maritime (76)	4	Laurent Fabius	PS
Seine-Maritime (76)	5	Christophe Bouillon	PS
Seine-Maritime (76)	6	Jean-Paul Lecoq	PCF
Seine-Maritime (76)	7	Jean-Yves Besselat	UMP
Seine-Maritime (76)	8	Daniel Paul	PCF
Seine-Maritime (76)	9	Daniel Fidelin	UMP
Seine-Maritime (76)	10	Alfred Trassy-Paillogues	UMP
Seine-Maritime (76)	11	Sandrine Hurel	PS
Seine-Maritime (76)	12	Michel Lejeune	UMP
Seine-et-Marne (77)	1	Jean-Claude Mignon	UMP
Seine-et-Marne (77)	2	Didier Julia	UMP
Seine-et-Marne (77)	3	Yves Jégo	UMP
Seine-et-Marne (77)	4	Christian Jacob	UMP
Seine-et-Marne (77)	5	Franck Riester	UMP
Seine-et-Marne (77)	6	Jean-François Copé	UMP
Seine-et-Marne (77)	7	Yves Albarello	UMP
Seine-et-Marne (77)	8	Chantal Brunel	UMP
Seine-et-Marne (77)	9	Guy Geoffroy	UMP
Yvelines (78)	1	Étienne Pinte	UMP
Yvelines (78)	2	Valérie Pécresse	UMP
Yvelines (78)	3	Christian Blanc	NC
Yvelines (78)	4	Pierre Lequiller	UMP
Yvelines (78)	5	Jacques Myard	UMP
Yvelines (78)	6	Pierre Morange	UMP
Yvelines (78)	7	Pierre Cardo	UMP
Yvelines (78)	8	Pierre Bédier	UMP
Yvelines (78)	9	Henri Cuq	UMP
Yvelines (78)	10	Christine Boutin	PCD
Yvelines (78)	11	Jean-Michel Fourgous	UMP
Yvelines (78)	12	Jacques Masdeu-Arus	UMP
Deux-Sèvres (79)	1	Geneviève Gaillard	PS
Deux-Sèvres (79)	2	Delphine Batho	PS
Deux-Sèvres (79)	3	Jean-Marie Morisset	UMP
Deux-Sèvres (79)	4	Jean Grellier	PS
Somme (80)	1	Maxime Gremetz	PCF
Somme (80)	2	Olivier Jardé	NC
Somme (80)	3	Jérôme Bignon	UMP
Somme (80)	4	Gilbert Mathon	PS
Somme (80)	5	Stéphane Demilly	NC
Somme (80)	6	Alain Gest	UMP
Tarn (81)	1	Jacques Valax	PS
Tarn (81)	2	Thierry Carcenac	PS
Tarn (81)	3	Philippe Folliot	UMP
Tarn (81)	4	Bernard Carayon	UMP
Tarn-et-Garonne (82)	1	Brigitte Barèges	UMP
Tarn-et-Garonne (82)	2	Sylvia Pinel	PRG
Var (83)	1	Geneviève Levy	UMP
Var (83)	2	Philippe Vitel	UMP
Var (83)	3	Jean-Pierre Giran	UMP
Var (83)	4	Jean-Michel Couve	UMP
Var (83)	5	Georges Ginesta	UMP
Var (83)	6	Josette Pons	UMP
Var (83)	7	Jean-Sébastien Vialatte	UMP
Vaucluse (84)	1	Marie-Josée Roig	UMP
Vaucluse (84)	2	Jean-Claude Bouchet	UMP
Vaucluse (84)	3	Jean-Michel Ferrand	UMP
Vaucluse (84)	4	Thierry Mariani	UMP
Vendée (85)	1	Jean-Luc Préel	NC
Vendée (85)	2	Dominique Caillaud	UMP
Vendée (85)	3	Louis Guédon	UMP
Vendée (85)	4	Véronique Besse	MPF
Vendée (85)	5	Joël Sarlot	MPF
Vienne (86)	1	Alain Claeys	PS
Vienne (86)	2	Catherine Coutelle	PS
Vienne (86)	3	Jean-Michel Clément	PS
Vienne (86)	4	Jean-Pierre Abelin	NC
Haute-Vienne (87)	1	Monique Boulestin	PS
Haute-Vienne (87)	2	Daniel Boisserie	PS
Haute-Vienne (87)	3	Marie-Françoise Pérol-Dumont	PS
Haute-Vienne (87)	4	Alain Rodet	PS
Vosges (88)	1	Michel Heinrich	UMP
Vosges (88)	2	Gérard Cherpion	UMP
Vosges (88)	3	François Vannson	UMP
Vosges (88)	4	Jean-Jacques Gaultier	UMP
Yonne (89)	1	Jean-Pierre Soisson	UMP
Yonne (89)	2	Jean-Marie Rolland	UMP
Yonne (89)	3	Marie-Louise Fort	UMP
Territoire de Belfort (90)	1	Damien Meslot	UMP
Territoire de Belfort (90)	2	Michel Zumkeller	UMP
Essonne (91)	1	Manuel Valls	PS
Essonne (91)	2	Franck Marlin	UMP
Essonne (91)	3	Geneviève Colot	UMP
Essonne (91)	4	Nathalie Kosciusko-Morizet	UMP
Essonne (91)	5	Pierre Lasbordes	UMP
Essonne (91)	6	François Lamy	PS
Essonne (91)	7	Jean Marsaudon	UMP
Essonne (91)	8	Nicolas Dupont-Aignan	DLR
Essonne (91)	9	Georges Tron	UMP
Essonne (91)	10	Julien Dray	PS
Hauts-de-Seine (92)	1	Roland Muzeau	PCF
Hauts-de-Seine (92)	2	Manuel Aeschlimann	UMP
Hauts-de-Seine (92)	3	Jacques Kossowski	UMP
Hauts-de-Seine (92)	4	Jacqueline Fraysse	PCF
Hauts-de-Seine (92)	5	Patrick Balkany	UMP
Hauts-de-Seine (92)	6	Joëlle Ceccaldi-Raynaud	UMP
Hauts-de-Seine (92)	7	Patrick Ollier	UMP
Hauts-de-Seine (92)	8	Jean-Jacques Guillet	UMP
Hauts-de-Seine (92)	9	Pierre-Christophe Baguet	UMP
Hauts-de-Seine (92)	10	André Santini	NC
Hauts-de-Seine (92)	11	Marie-Hélène Amiable	PCF
Hauts-de-Seine (92)	12	Philippe Pemezec	UMP
Hauts-de-Seine (92)	13	Patrick Devedjian	UMP
Seine-Saint-Denis (93)	1	Bruno Le Roux	PS
Seine-Saint-Denis (93)	2	Patrick Braouezec	PCF
Seine-Saint-Denis (93)	3	Daniel Goldberg	PS
Seine-Saint-Denis (93)	4	Marie-George Buffet	PCF
Seine-Saint-Denis (93)	5	Jean-Christophe Lagarde	MoDem
Seine-Saint-Denis (93)	6	Claude Bartolone	PS
Seine-Saint-Denis (93)	7	Jean-Pierre Brard	CAP
Seine-Saint-Denis (93)	8	Patrice Calmejane	UMP
Seine-Saint-Denis (93)	9	Élisabeth Guigou	PS
Seine-Saint-Denis (93)	10	Gérard Gaudron	UMP
Seine-Saint-Denis (93)	11	François Asensi	PCF
Seine-Saint-Denis (93)	12	Éric Raoult	UMP
Seine-Saint-Denis (93)	13	Michel Pajon	PS
Val-de-Marne (94)	1	Henri Plagnol	UMP
Val-de-Marne (94)	2	Laurent Cathala	PS
Val-de-Marne (94)	3	Didier Gonzales	UMP
Val-de-Marne (94)	4	Jacques-Alain Bénisti	UMP
Val-de-Marne (94)	5	Gilles Carrez	UMP
Val-de-Marne (94)	6	Patrick Beaudouin	UMP
Val-de-Marne (94)	7	Marie-Anne Montchamp	UMP
Val-de-Marne (94)	8	Michel Herbillon	UMP
Val-de-Marne (94)	9	René Rouquet	PS
Val-de-Marne (94)	10	Pierre Gosnat	PCF
Val-de-Marne (94)	11	Jean-Yves Le Bouillonnec	PS
Val-de-Marne (94)	12	Richard Dell'Agnola	UMP
Val-d'Oise (95)	1	Philippe Houillon	UMP
Val-d'Oise (95)	2	Axel Poniatowski	UMP
Val-d'Oise (95)	3	Jean Bardet	UMP
Val-d'Oise (95)	4	Claude Bodin	UMP
Val-d'Oise (95)	5	Georges Mothron	UMP
Val-d'Oise (95)	6	François Scellier	UMP
Val-d'Oise (95)	7	Jérôme Chartier	UMP
Val-d'Oise (95)	8	Dominique Strauss-Kahn	PS
Val-d'Oise (95)	9	Yanick Paternotte	UMP
Guadeloupe (971)	1	Eric Jalton	PS
Guadeloupe (971)	2	Gabrielle Louis-Carabin	UMP
Guadeloupe (971)	3	Jeanny Marc	PS
Guadeloupe (971)	4	Victorin Lurel	PS
Martinique (972)	1	Louis-Joseph Manscour	PS
Martinique (972)	2	Alfred Almont	UMP
Martinique (972)	3	Serge Letchimy	DVG
Martinique (972)	4	Alfred Marie-Jeanne	DVG
Guyane (973)	1	Christiane Taubira	PRG
Guyane (973)	2	Chantal Berthelot	PRG
Réunion (974)	1	René-Paul Victoria	UMP
Réunion (974)	2	Huguette Bello	PCR
Réunion (974)	3	Didier Robert	UMP
Réunion (974)	4	Patrick Lebreton	PS
Réunion (974)	5	Jean-Claude Fruteau	PS
Saint Pierre and Miquelon (975)	1	Annick Girardin	PRG
Mayotte (976)	1	Abdoulatifou Aly	MoDem
Wallis and Futuna	1	Albert Likuvalu	PS
French Polynesia	1	Michel Buillard	UMP
French Polynesia	2	Bruno Sandras	UMP
New Caledonia	1	Gaël Yanno	UMP
New Caledonia	2	Pierre Frogier	UMP

== See also ==
- Senate of France
