= Results of the 2024 French legislative election in Loiret =

Following the first round of the 2024 French legislative election on 30 June 2024, runoff elections in each constituency where no candidate received a vote share greater than 50 percent were scheduled for 7 July. Candidates permitted to stand in the runoff elections needed to either come in first or second place in the first round or achieve more than 12.5 percent of the votes of the entire electorate (as opposed to 12.5 percent of the vote share due to low turnout).

== Loiret ==
=== 1st constituency ===
Candidate	Party or alliance		First round		Second round	
Candidate	Party or alliance		Votes	%	Votes	%
Stéphanie Rist	Ensemble	Renaissance	16,775	31.60	34,909	67.68
Ghislaine Kounowski	New Popular Front	Socialist Party	16,706	31.47		
Tiffanie Rabault	National Rally		14,880	28.03	16,667	32.32
Guillaume Chassang	Miscellaneous centre	Independent	3,620	6.82		
Nicole Maurice	Reconquête		659	1.24		
Claude Trepka	Far-left	Lutte Ouvrière	439	0.83		
Total			53,079	100.00	51,576	100.00
Valid votes			53,079	98.00	51,576	95.22
Invalid votes			282	0.52	617	1.14
Blank votes			803	1.48	1,972	3.64
Total votes			54,164	100.00	54,165	100.00
Registered voters/turnout			78,309	69.17	78,282	69.19

=== 2nd constituency ===
Candidate	Party or alliance		First round		Second round	
Candidate	Party or alliance		Votes	%	Votes	%
Elodie Babin	National Rally		18,957	32.91	23,375	43.85
Emmanuel Duplessy	New Popular Front	Génération.s	16,148	28.03	29,934	56.15
Caroline Janvier	Ensemble	Renaissance	13,263	23.03		
Cyril Colas	The Republicans		4,527	7.86		
Yann Chaillou	Miscellaneous left	Independent	1,951	3.39		
Bruno Carrani	Ecologists	Independent	1,474	2.56		
Marie-Odile Duvillard	Reconquête		716	1.24		
Farida Megdoud	Far-left	Lutte Ouvrière	388	0.67		
Ahmed Aachboun	Miscellaneous left	Independent	178	0.31		
Total			57,602	100.00	53,309	100.00
Valid votes			57,602	97.90	53,309	90.50
Invalid votes			398	0.68	1,264	2.15
Blank votes			836	1.42	4,330	7.35
Total votes			58,836	100.00	58,903	100.00
Registered voters/turnout			88,601	66.41	88,623	66.46

=== 3rd constituency ===
Candidate	Party or alliance		First round		Second round	
Candidate	Party or alliance		Votes	%	Votes	%
Mathilde Paris	National Rally		21,373	45.53	22,827	48.89
Constance de Pélichy	Miscellaneous right	Independent	15,041	32.04	23,863	51.11
Clément Verde	New Popular Front	La France Insoumise	9,089	19.36		
Thomas Maurice	Reconquête		792	1.69		
Michel Naulin	Far-left	Lutte Ouvrière	648	1.38		
Total			46,943	100.00	46,690	100.00
Valid votes			46,943	97.13	46,690	96.03
Invalid votes			382	0.79	501	1.03
Blank votes			1,005	2.08	1,427	2.94
Total votes			48,330	100.00	48,618	100.00
Registered voters/turnout			70,445	68.61	70,459	69.00

=== 4th constituency ===
Candidate	Party or alliance		First round		Second round	
Candidate	Party or alliance		Votes	%	Votes	%
Thomas Ménagé	National Rally		23,231	49.65	26,947	62.59
Bruno Nottin	New Popular Front	Communist Party	9,889	21.14	16,104	37.41
Mélusine Harlé	Ensemble	Renaissance	7,029	15.02		
Ariel Lévy	The Republicans		5,537	11.83		
Dominique Clergue	Far-left	Lutte Ouvrière	551	1.18		
Georges Loubert	Reconquête		535	1.14		
Françoise Roche	Independent		13	0.03		
Total			46,785	100.00	43,051	100.00
Valid votes			46,785	97.38	43,051	90.60
Invalid votes			305	0.63	1,047	2.20
Blank votes			955	1.99	3,419	7.20
Total votes			48,045	100.00	47,517	100.00
Registered voters/turnout			74,099	64.84	74,113	64.11

=== 5th constituency ===
Candidate	Party or alliance		First round		Second round	
Candidate	Party or alliance		Votes	%	Votes	%
Jean-Lin Lacapelle	National Rally		20,893	43.37	23,335	49.30
Anthony Brosse	Ensemble	Renaissance	10,604	22.01	23,999	50.70
Anne-Laure Boutet	New Popular Front	La France Insoumise	9,524	19.77		
Benjamin Quelin	Miscellaneous right	The Republicans	4,817	10.00		
Christine Biardeau	Independent		1,259	2.61		
Martine Robert	Reconquête		651	1.35		
Céline Sottejeau	Far-left	Lutte Ouvrière	429	0.89		
Total			48,177	100.00	47,334	100.00
Valid votes			48,177	97.65	47,334	95.49
Invalid votes			365	0.74	562	1.13
Blank votes			793	1.61	1,675	3.38
Total votes			49,335	100.00	49,571	100.00
Registered voters/turnout			73,581	67.05	73,605	67.35

=== 6th constituency ===
Candidate	Party or alliance		First round		Second round	
Candidate	Party or alliance		Votes	%	Votes	%
Anthony Zeller	National Rally		16,253	31.60	18,392	36.69
Richard Ramos	Ensemble	Democratic Movement	15,635	30.40	31,737	63.31
Christophe Lavialle	New Popular Front	Socialist Party	15,176	29.50		
Jean-Luc Poisson	The Republicans		2,239	4.35		
Isabelle Lamarque	Reconquête		664	1.29		
Stéphanie Brun	Miscellaneous right	Independent	348	0.68		
Annie Berthault-Korzhyk	Sovereigntist right	Independent	595	1.16		
David Choquel	Far-left	Lutte Ouvrière	528	1.03		
Total			51,438	100.00	50,129	100.00
Valid votes			51,438	97.71	50,129	95.78
Invalid votes			340	0.65	530	1.01
Blank votes			867	1.65	1,676	3.20
Total votes			52,645	100.00	52,335	100.00
Registered voters/turnout			76,084	69.19	76,104	68.77
