= French Future =

French Future L'Avenir français
- Abbreviation: LAF
- Leader: Jean-Philippe Tanguy
- Founded: 22 March 2021
- Split from: Debout la France
- Ideology: Euroscepticism; Anti-immigration
- Political position: Far-right
- National Assembly group: National Rally
- Colours: Blue; White; Red
- Slogan: «For a free France!» (French: «Pour une France libre!»)
- National Assembly: 5 / 577
- Senate: 0 / 348
- Regional councillors: 14 / 1,758

Website
- avenirfrancais.fr

The French Future (French: L'Avenir français; LAF) is a French political movement founded by dissidents from the Debout la France party, in disagreement with Nicolas Dupont-Aignan on his strategy for the 2021 regional elections, and wishing to get closer to Marine Le Pen and the National Rally.

== History ==
On November 22, 2020, Jean-Philippe Tanguy, vice-president of Debout la France, announced his departure, followed by around sixty executives from Nicolas Dupont-Aignan's movement to form a collective of "sovereigntist Gaullists" (initially called Demain la France) which wishes to support Marine Le Pen in the next presidential election.

The foundation of French Future is formalized on March 22, 2021, in the presence of Marine Le Pen. The movement defines itself as independent and an ally of the National Rally and wishes to stand alongside it in the regional and departmental elections in June. It obtained 14 regional advisers in eight regions.

== Election results ==
=== European Parliament ===
Election	Leader	Votes	%	Seats	+/–	EP Group
2024 (Note: Run in a joint list with RN.)	Jean-Philippe Tanguy	7,765,936	31.50 (#1)	0 / 81	New	–

== National Assembly ==
Deputies elected in 2022 (reelected in 2024)
Name	Constituency	Group
Alexandre Loubet	Moselle's 7th	National Rally group
Thomas Ménagé	Loiret's 4th constituency	National Rally group
Alexandre Sabatou	Oise's 3rd	National Rally group
Jean-Philippe Tanguy	Somme's 4th	National Rally group
Michaël Taverne	Nord's 12th	National Rally group

== Regional representation ==
LAF Regional Councilors elected in 2021
Name	Region	Group
Pascal Blaise	Bourgogne-Franche-Comté (Yonne)	Rassemblement national
Olivier Damien	Bourgogne-Franche-Comté (Nièvre)	Rassemblement national
Thomas Ménagé	Centre-Val de Loire (Loiret)	Rassemblement national et Alliés
Régine Flaunet	Centre-Val de Loire (Indre-et-Loire)	Rassemblement national et Alliés
Lionel Bejeau	Centre-Val de Loire (Indre-et-Loire)	Rassemblement national et Alliés
Anne-Sophie Frigout	Grand Est (Marne)	Rassemblement national et apparentés
Philippe Morenvillier	Grand Est (Meurthe-et-Moselle)	Rassemblement national et apparentés
Pascal Tschaen	Grand Est (Haut-Rhin)	Rassemblement national et apparentés
Jean-Philippe Tanguy	Hauts-de-France (Somme)	RN, indépendants et apparentés
Philippe Théveniaud	Hauts-de-France (Somme)	RN, indépendants et apparentés
Nadejda Rémy	Île-de-France (Val-d'Oise)	Rassemblement national Île-de-France
Olivier Pjanic	Normandy (Manche)	National Rally
Johanna Maurel	Occitania (Hérault)	Rassemblement national
Hervé Fabre-Aubrespy	Provence-Alpes-Côte d'Azur (Bouches-du-Rhône)	Construisons la région de demain
