= Somme's 4th constituency =

Constituency of the National Assembly of France

4th constituency of Somme
- inline Constituency of the National Assembly of France

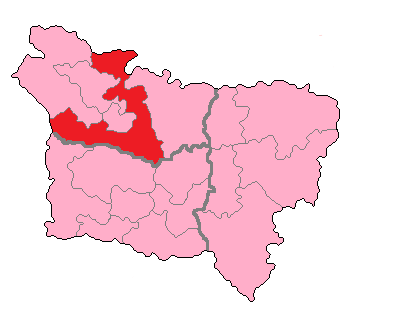
- Somme's 4th Constituency shown within Picardie
- Deputy: Jean-Philippe Tanguy; RN
- Department: Somme
- Cantons: Ailly-sur-Noye, Bernaville, Conty, Corbie, Doullens, Hornoy-le-Bourg, Montdidier, Moreuil, Poix-de-Picardie, Villers-Bocage
- Registered voters: 82,795

The 4th constituency of Somme is a French legislative constituency in the Somme département. Like the other 576 French constituencies, it elects one MP using the two-round system, with a run-off if no candidate receives over 50% of the vote in the first round.

== Description ==
The 4th constituency of the Somme was radically altered as a result of the 2010 redistricting of French legislative constituencies and as a result is now completely different from the seat which bore the same name between 1988 and 2012. The new seat is closer in composition to the now defunct Somme's 6th constituency.

The constituency runs through the centre of the department but also includes a strip of territory along its southern edge. In its centre the seats surrounds the city of Amiens on three sides.

Notably the seat has changed hands at every election since 1988.

== Historic Representation ==
| Election | Member | Party |
|---|---|---|
| 1958 | Max Lejeune | SFIO |
| 1962 | Max Lejeune | SFIO |
| 1967 | Max Lejeune | SFIO |
| 1968 | Max Lejeune | SFIO |
| 1973 | Max Lejeune | SFIO |
| 1978 | Chantal Leblanc | PCF |
| 1981 | Jacques Becq | PS |
| 1986 | Proportional representation – no election by constituency | |
| 1988 | Jacques Becq | PS |
| 1993 | Joël Hart | RPR |
| 1997 | Francis Hammel | PS |
| 2002 | Joël Hart | UMP |
| 2007 | Gilbert Mathon | PS |
| 2012 | Alain Gest | UMP |
| 2017 | Jean-Claude Leclabart | LREM |
| 2022 | Jean-Philippe Tanguy | RN |

== Election results ==
=== 2024 ===
Legislative Election 2024: Somme's 4th constituency
| Party | Candidate | Votes | % | ±% |
|---|---|---|---|---|
| LR | Vincent Jacques | 7,759 | 13.48 | N/A |
| RE (Ensemble) | Anthony Gest | 10,631 | 18.47 | −6.63 |
| LÉ–EELV (NFP) | Elodie Héren | 9,789 | 17.01 | −2.31 |
| LO | Guy Vitoux | 820 | 1.42 | N/A |
| RN | Jean-Philippe Tanguy | 28,559 | 49.62 | +17.17 |
| Turnout | | 57,558 | 97.26 | +46.59 |
| Registered electors | | 85,080 | | |
2nd round result
| RN | Jean-Philippe Tanguy | 31,468 | 57.48 | +2.89 |
| RE | Anthony Gest | 23,276 | 42.52 | −2.89 |
| Turnout | | 54,744 | 93.86 | +43.87 |
| Registered electors | | 85,101 | | |
| RN hold | | Swing | | |

=== 2022 ===
2022 French legislative election: Somme's 4th constituency
| Party | Candidate | Votes | % | ±% |
|---|---|---|---|---|
| RN | Jean-Philippe Tanguy | 13,575 | 32.45 | +11.24 |
| LREM (Ensemble) | Jean-Claude Leclabart | 10,497 | 25.10 | –7.61 |
| EELV (NUPÉS) | Elodie Héren | 8,081 | 19.32 | +1.46 |
| LMR (UDC) | Vincent Jacques | 6,066 | 14.50 | –7.65 |
| REC | Jacques Maguin | 1,259 | 3.01 | N/A |
| Others | N/A | 2,350 | - | − |
| Turnout | | 41,828 | 50.67 | –0.18 |
2nd round result
| RN | Jean-Philippe Tanguy | 21,136 | 54.59 | +12.63 |
| LREM (Ensemble) | Jean-Claude Leclabart | 17,584 | 45.41 | −12.63 |
| Turnout | | 38,720 | 49.99 | +7.98 |
| RN gain from LREM | | | | |

=== 2017 ===
Legislative Election 2017: Somme's 4th constituency
| Party | Candidate | Votes | % | ±% |
|---|---|---|---|---|
| LREM | Jean-Claude Leclabart | 13,977 | 32.71 | |
| FN | Eric Richermoz | 9,266 | 21.69 | |
| LR | Martin Domise | 7,726 | 18.08 | |
| LFI | Christophe Hertout | 5,540 | 12.97 | |
| EELV | Elodie Heren | 2,091 | 4.89 | |
| UDI | Christelle Hiver | 1,783 | 4.17 | |
| DLF | Patricia Wybo | 1,083 | 2.53 | |
| Others | N/A | 1,263 | | |
| Turnout | | 42,729 | 50.85 | |
2nd round result
| LREM | Jean-Claude Leclabart | 20,489 | 58.04 | |
| FN | Eric Richermoz | 14,811 | 41.96 | |
| Turnout | | 35,300 | 42.01 | |
| LREM gain from LR | | Swing | | |

=== 2012 ===
Legislative Election 2012: Somme's 4th constituency
| Party | Candidate | Votes | % | ±% |
|---|---|---|---|---|
| UMP | Alain Gest | 17,717 | 34.64 | |
| PS | Catherine Quignon | 16,738 | 32.73 | |
| FN | Valéry Le Douguet | 8,496 | 16.61 | |
| MoDem | Jean-Christophe Loric | 3,226 | 6.31 | |
| FG | Agnès Fruitier | 2,540 | 4.97 | |
| EELV | Christian Wyttynck | 1,051 | 2.05 | |
| Others | N/A | 1,378 | | |
| Turnout | | 51,146 | 61.77 | |
2nd round result
| UMP | Alain Gest | 25,351 | 50.55 | |
| PS | Catherine Quignon | 24,795 | 49.45 | |
| Turnout | | 50,146 | 60.57 | |
| UMP gain from PS | | | | |

=== 2007 ===
Legislative Election 2007: Somme's 4th constituency
| Party | Candidate | Votes | % | ±% |
|---|---|---|---|---|
| UMP | Joël Hart | 17,237 | 38.18 | |
| PS | Gilbert Mathon | 11,790 | 26.11 | |
| CPNT | Renaud Blondin | 3,648 | 8.08 | |
| FN | Alexandra Meriguet | 2,618 | 5.80 | |
| MoDem | François Vasseur | 2,487 | 5.51 | |
| DVG | Francis Hammel | 1,709 | 3.79 | |
| Far left | Laurent Van Elslande | 1,245 | 2.76 | |
| DVG | Patrick Sellier | 1,069 | 2.37 | |
| Others | N/A | 3,348 | | |
| Turnout | | 46,562 | 63.69 | |
2nd round result
| PS | Gilbert Mathon | 23,555 | 51.62 | |
| UMP | Joël Hart | 22,076 | 48.38 | |
| Turnout | | 47,732 | 65.30 | |
| PS gain from UMP | | | | |

=== 2002 ===
Legislative Election 2002: Somme's 4th constituency
| Party | Candidate | Votes | % | ±% |
|---|---|---|---|---|
| UMP | Joël Hart | 16,273 | 34.01 | |
| PS | Francis Hammel | 10,725 | 22.41 | |
| CPNT | Jean Pilniak | 6,364 | 13.30 | |
| FN | Jacqueline Bricour | 4,606 | 9.63 | |
| UDF | Regis Lecuyer | 3,797 | 7.93 | |
| PCF | Chantal Leblanc | 2,527 | 5.28 | |
| Others | N/A | 3,562 | | |
| Turnout | | 49,084 | 68.35 | |
2nd round result
| UMP | Joël Hart | 26,361 | 58.75 | |
| PS | Francis Hammel | 18,509 | 41.25 | |
| Turnout | | 47,202 | 65.74 | |
| UMP gain from PS | | | | |

=== 1997 ===
Legislative Election 1997: Somme's 4th constituency
| Party | Candidate | Votes | % | ±% |
|---|---|---|---|---|
| RPR | Joël Hart | 16,114 | 33.16 | |
| PS | Francis Hammel | 12,092 | 24.88 | |
| PCF | Chantal Leblanc | 7,812 | 16.07 | |
| FN | Raynald Brasseur | 6,364 | 13.09 | |
| DVD | Jean-Claude Padot | 1,577 | 3.24 | |
| LO | Paul Palacio | 1,367 | 2.81 | |
| Others | N/A | 3,273 | | |
| Turnout | | 51,550 | 74.63 | |
2nd round result
| PS | Francis Hammel | 27,948 | 54.18 | |
| RPR | Joël Hart | 23,631 | 45.82 | |
| Turnout | | 54,376 | 78.74 | |
| PS gain from RPR | | | | |

== Sources ==
Official results of French elections from 2002: "Résultats électoraux officiels en France" (in French).
