= 2018 Loiret's 4th constituency by-election =

← 2017	18 March 2018 (first round); 25 March 2018 (second round)	2022 →
- Turnout: 30.36% ▼18.60% (first round); 28.61% ▼14.76% (second round)
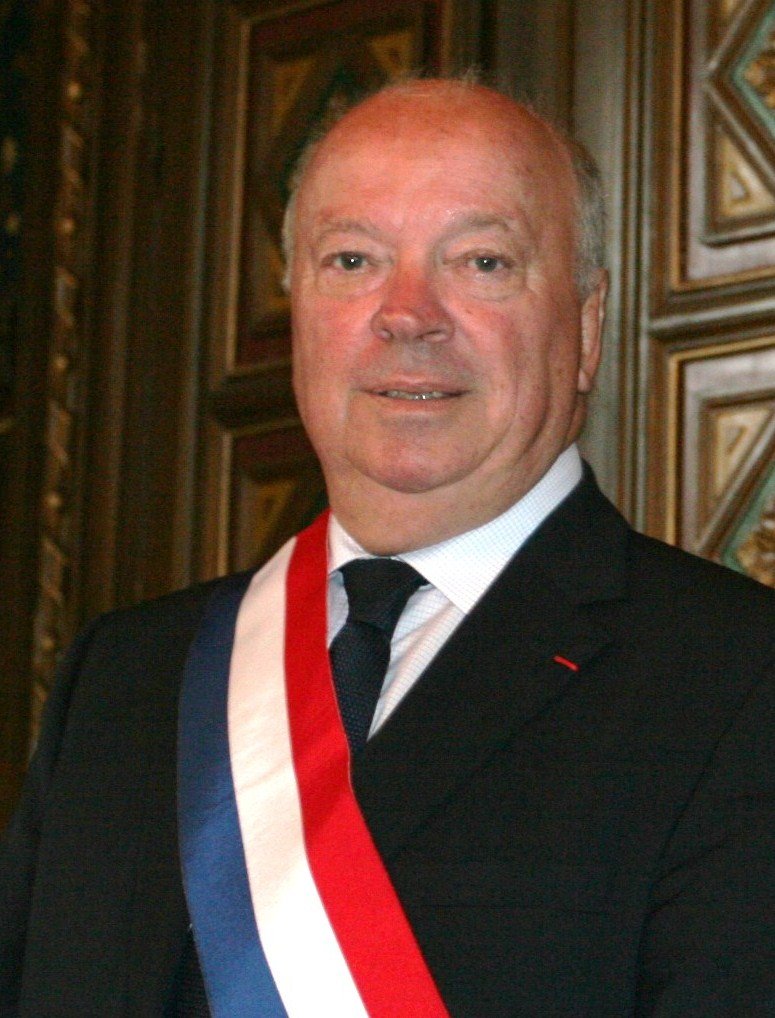

Nominee	Jean-Pierre Door	Mélusine Harlé	Ludovic Marchetti
Party	LR	LREM	FN
1st round %	8,330; 38.20% ▲14.41%	4,406; 20.20% ▼8.35%	3,026; 13.88% ▼6.91%
2nd round %	12,632; 67.08% ▲17.07%	6,199; 32.92% ▼17.07%	Eliminated
Nominee	Jalila Gaboret	Bruno Nottin	Luc Bucheton
Party	PS	PCF	DLF
1st round %	1,450; 6.65% ▲1.17%	1,300; 5.96% ▼5.64%	1,140; 5.23% ▲2.22%
2nd round %	Eliminated	Eliminated	Eliminated
Deputy before election
Jean-Pierre Door
LR
Elected deputy
Jean-Pierre Door
LR

A by-election was held in Loiret's 4th constituency on 18 March 2018, with a second round on 25 March as no candidate secured a majority of votes in the first round. The by-election was prompted by the invalidation of the election of Jean-Pierre Door, candidate of The Republicans (LR), in the June 2017 legislative elections by the Constitutional Council on 18 December 2017. In the second round of the 2017 legislative elections on 18 June, the result was the closest in the country, with Door winning by 8 votes before the election was annulled.

Door won the second round of the by-election with 67.08% of the vote against Mélusine Harlé, candidate of La République En Marche!, with 32.92%.

== Background ==
Following the second round of the 2017 legislative election in Loiret's 4th constituency on 18 June, Mélusine Harlé, candidate of La République En Marche! defeated by 8 votes in the closest contest of the year, filed an appeal with the Constitutional Council appealing the election of Jean-Pierre Door of The Republicans (LR).

On 18 December, the constitutional council annulled the election of Door, with the number of ballots in the commune of Préfontaines differing from the number of signatures, reducing the number of votes cast there from 166 to 165. In addition, article L. 49 of the electoral code prohibits candidates from distributing electoral materials starting from midnight the day before the election, and Harlé argued that a Facebook post made by Door depicting a speech in his capacities as mayor of Montargis commemorating the Appeal of 18 June, as well as a post made by deputy mayor Fabrice Bouscal noting that he voted for Door and inviting voters to "choose the experience faced with adventure", were in breach of the article. Given the extremely narrow margin between the two candidates at the fact that the Facebook posts were not private but public and made on the date of the election, the constitutional council ruled to annul the election of Door, triggering a by-election in the constituency.

The first and second rounds of the by-election were scheduled for 18 and 25 March 2018, with 119 polling stations in 69 communes open from 8:00 to 18:00 CET.

Candidates were required submit declarations of their candidacies between 19 and 23 February.

== Candidates ==
Incumbent deputy Jean-Pierre Door of The Republicans (LR), a 76-year-old cardiologist, stood in the by-election to attempt to maintain his seat. On 30 January 2018, the Union of Democrats and Independents (UDI) announced its support for Door, citing his support for the political line of Alain Juppé. Deputy and president of the Union of the Right and Centre group in the regional council of Centre-Val de Loire Guillaume Peltier visited the constituency to support Door on 8 March, followed by senator Jean-Noël Cardoux on 9 March, former minister Élisabeth Hubert on 13 March, LR president Laurent Wauquiez, president of The Republicans group in the National Assembly Christian Jacob, and deputy Antoine Savignat on 14 March, accompanied by UDI deputies Philippe Vigier and Maurice Leroy at a meeting attended by over 400 people, and Valérie Pécresse and Damien Abad between the two rounds on 20 March.

Mélusine Harlé, a 45-year-old CEO of a management company and candidate of La République En Marche!, launched her campaign on 13 January 2018 alongside party president Christophe Castaner, against the backdrop of motorcyclists protesting the government's reduction of speed limits on local roads from 90 km/h to 80 km/h. On 1 March, minister Jacqueline Gourault attended a public meeting in support of Harlé in Solterre, and Mounir Mahjoubi visited Ferrières-en-Gâtinais on 2 March. Deputies Aurore Bergé, Gilles Le Gendre, and Caroline Janvier also campaigned on behalf of Harlé at a public meeting on 9 March, and Olivier Dussopt subsequently visited the constituency on 16 March.

Ludovic Marchetti, a 31-year-old pastry chef, municipal councillor of Amilly, and departmental secretary of the National Front (FN) in Loiret, was again selected as the party's candidate in the constituency.

The section of the French Communist Party (PCF) based in the constituency argued for a common front on the left unifying the PCF, La France Insoumise, and supporters of Benoît Hamon behind a single antiliberal and ecologist candidate. Franck Demaumont of the PCF also initially intended to run, before reversing his decision and Bruno Nottin was nominated in his place, with Françoise Causse of La France Insoumise selected as his substitute. Nottin, a 43-year-old court clerk, received the support of Europe Ecology – The Greens (EELV), which was initially considered likely to present its own candidate. On 6 March, Pierre Laurent, national secretary of the PCF, visited Amilly to support Nottin.

Jérôme Schmitt, a 46-year-old employed in the nuclear sector, contested Loiret's 6th constituency in 2017 and stood as the candidate of La France Insoumise, which did not present a candidate in the constituency in June against PCF mayor of Châlette-sur-Loing Franck Demaumont in acknowledgment of his sponsorship of Jean-Luc Mélenchon for the presidential election. However, relations between the two movements deteriorated since then, though Schmitt did not rule out the possibility of an alliance with the PCF. Adrien Quatennens and François Ruffin visited the constituency in support of Schmitt on 1 March, followed by door-to-door campaigning by deputies Sabine Rubin and Éric Coquerel on 10 March, and Jean-Luc Mélenchon hosted a public meeting, introduced by Alexis Corbière, that was attended by some 200 people in Montargis on 13 March.

Jalila Gaboret, a 45-year-old secondary school teacher, was again announced as the candidate of the PS on 27 January, and received the support of Olivier Faure, leader of the New Left group in the National Assembly, at a public meeting in Ingré on 19 February.

Luc Bucheton, a 55-year-notary and departmental secretary of Debout la France (DLF), was again invested by the party, and received the support of DLF president Nicolas Dupont-Aignan in Cepoy on 14 March, and was also accompanied by FN regional councillor Alexandre Cuignache, who decided to leave the party to join Dupont-Aignan.

Dominique Clergue, a 52-year-old blue-collar worker, was again invested by Lutte Ouvrière (LO). Laurent Chaillou, a 46-year-old supervisor, was invested by the Popular Republican Union (UPR), and UPR founder François Asselineau visited the constituency in support of his party's candidate on 10 March. Nicolas Rousseaux, a 42-year-old executive, was invested under the banner of Force Nationale. Frédéric Chaouat, a 55-year-old English professor, stood as an independent candidate. Joël-Pierre Chevreux, a 62-year-old editor of an online publication, stood as the candidate of the Humans, Animals, Nature Movement (MHAN).

France Bleu Orléans and apostrophe45 broadcast a debate between Door and Harlé on 22 March at 19:00 CET.

== 2017 election result ==
First round results by commune

Second round results by commune

Candidate	Party	First round		Second round	
Candidate	Party	Votes	%	Votes	%
Mélusine Harlé	LREM	10,215	28.56	14,553	49.99
Jean-Pierre Door	LR	8,507	23.78	14,561	50.01
Ludovic Marchetti	FN	7,434	20.78		
Franck Demaumont	PCF	4,148	11.60		
Jalila Gaboret	PS	1,961	5.48		
Luc Bucheton	DLF	1,075	3.01		
Alphonse Proffit	DIV	849	2.37		
Massila Salemkour	EELV	813	2.27		
Dominique Clergue	LO	343	0.96		
Zoé Baron	UPR	234	0.65		
Christine Rochoux	DVD	191	0.53		
Votes		35,770	100.00	29,114	100.00
Valid votes		35,770	97.87	29,114	89.93
Blank votes		551	1.51	2,316	7.15
Null votes		226	0.62	944	2.92
Turnout		36,547	48.96	32,374	43.37
Abstentions		38,100	51.04	42,269	56.63
Registered voters		74,647		74,643	
Source: Ministry of the Interior, political parties * Incumbent deputy

== 2018 by-election result ==
First round results by commune

Second round results by commune

Candidate	Party	First round			Second round		
Candidate	Party	Votes	%	+/–	Votes	%	+/–
Jean-Pierre Door	LR	8,330	38.20	+14.41	12,632	67.08	+17.07
Mélusine Harlé	LREM	4,406	20.20	–8.35	6,199	32.92	–17.07
Ludovic Marchetti	FN	3,026	13.88	–6.91			
Jalila Gaboret	PS	1,450	6.65	+1.17			
Bruno Nottin	PCF	1,300	5.96	–5.64			
Luc Bucheton	DLF	1,140	5.23	+2.22			
Jérôme Schmitt	LFI	1,081	4.96	+4.96			
Joël-Pierre Chevreux	ECO	427	1.96	+1.96			
Dominique Clergue	LO	349	1.60	+0.64			
Laurent Chaillou	UPR	177	0.81	+0.16			
Nicolas Rousseaux	EXD	93	0.43	+0.43			
Frédéric Chaouat	DIV	29	0.13	+0.13			
Votes		21,808	100.00	–	18,831	100.00	–
Valid votes		21,808	96.97	–0.90	18,831	88.88	–1.05
Blank votes		442	1.97	+0.46	1,492	7.04	–0.11
Null votes		239	1.06	+0.44	865	4.08	+1.17
Turnout		22,489	30.36	–18.60	21,188	28.61	–14.76
Abstentions		51,574	69.64	+18.60	52,866	71.39	+14.76
Registered voters		74,063			74,054		
Source: Préfecture du Loiret
