= Thomas Ménagé =

French politician and activist (born 1992)

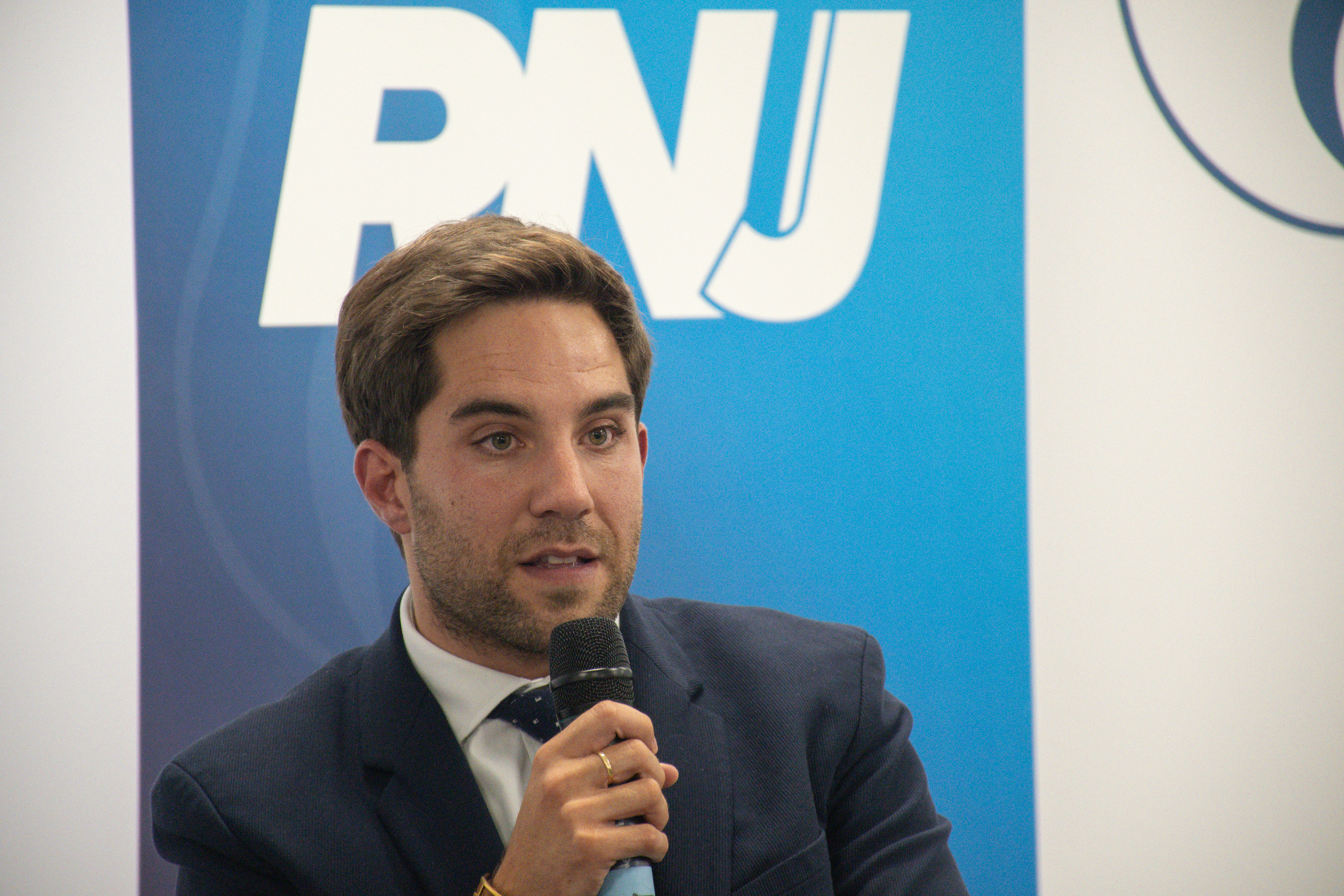

Member of the National Assembly for Loiret's 4th constituency
- Incumbent
- Assumed office 22 June 2022
- Preceded by: Jean-Pierre Door

Member of the Regional Council of Centre-Val de Loire
- Incumbent
- Assumed office 2 July 2021
- President: François Bonneau

Personal details
- Born: 6 January 1992 (age 34) Blois, France
- Party: French Future (2021–present)
- Other political affiliations: Union for a Popular Movement (formerly); Debout la France (2014–2019); National Rally (affiliated non-member, 2021-present)
- Education: University of Tours; Panthéon-Sorbonne University

Thomas Ménagé (born 6 January 1992) is a French politician who has represented the 4th constituency of the Loiret department in the National Assembly since 2022.

Ménagé was a member of Debout la France (DLF) before he joined other former members in 2021 in founding their own political movement, French Future (LAF). In the 2022 legislative election, the movement formed an alliance with the National Rally (RN) and contested the election on a unified ticket.

Prior to his service in the National Assembly, Ménagé served as Deputy Mayor of Ouchamps from 2014 to 2020. In 2021, he was elected to the Regional Council of Centre-Val de Loire.

== Biography ==
=== Early life ===
Ménagé grew up in Ouchamps, Loir-et-Cher. He completed his secondary studies at the Lycée de Pontlevoy. He then obtained a law degree from the University of Tours in 2013 and a master's degree in public law from Panthéon-Sorbonne University in 2015. In 2013–2014, he was the spokesman of La Manif pour tous in Loir-et-Cher.

After graduating he worked in property law and as a construction and real-estate manager.

=== Debout la France ===
Politically, Ménagé identifies as a Gaullist. He initially supported the Union for a Popular Movement during the 2007 presidential campaign of Nicolas Sarkozy before joining Debout la France in 2014. He served as Deputy Mayor of Ouchamps for Urbanism from 2014 to 2020.

He served as chief of staff to Nicolas Dupont-Aignan and as a managing director of Debout la France from 2017 to 2019. Ahead of the second round of the 2017 presidential election he facilitated the negotiation of an agreement between Nicolas Dupont-Aignan and Marine Le Pen in which Le Pen would appoint Dupont-Aignan as Prime Minister should she win the election.

He mulled a run for the National Assembly in the 1st constituency of Loir-et-Cher in 2017 but eventually withdrew.

=== French Future and National Rally ===
Ménagé resigned from Debout la France in 2019, citing strategic disagreements between with the party leadership. With other former Debout la France members he founded a new conservative movement, French Future (L'Avenir français), which he claimed would be conceptionally close to the ideas of the National Rally.

In the 2021 regional election, he was elected as a regional councillor of Centre-Val de Loire, sitting with the National Rally group.

In the 2022 legislative election, he was announced as a candidate in the 4th constituency of Loiret, standing affiliated to the National Rally's ticket despite not being a member of the party. In the first round, he defeated Education Minister Jean-Michel Blanquer of La République En Marche!, who ran under the Ensemble alliance and, in the second round, won with 63.3% of the vote against the French Communist Party candidate Bruno Nottin, who ran under the New Ecological and Social People's Union alliance. In the National Assembly, Ménagé sits with the National Rally group.

== Personal life ==
In 2013-2014, Ménagé opposed same-sex marriage as a member of La Manif pour tous. He came out as gay in 2024.
