= Mathilde Paris =

French politician (born 1985)

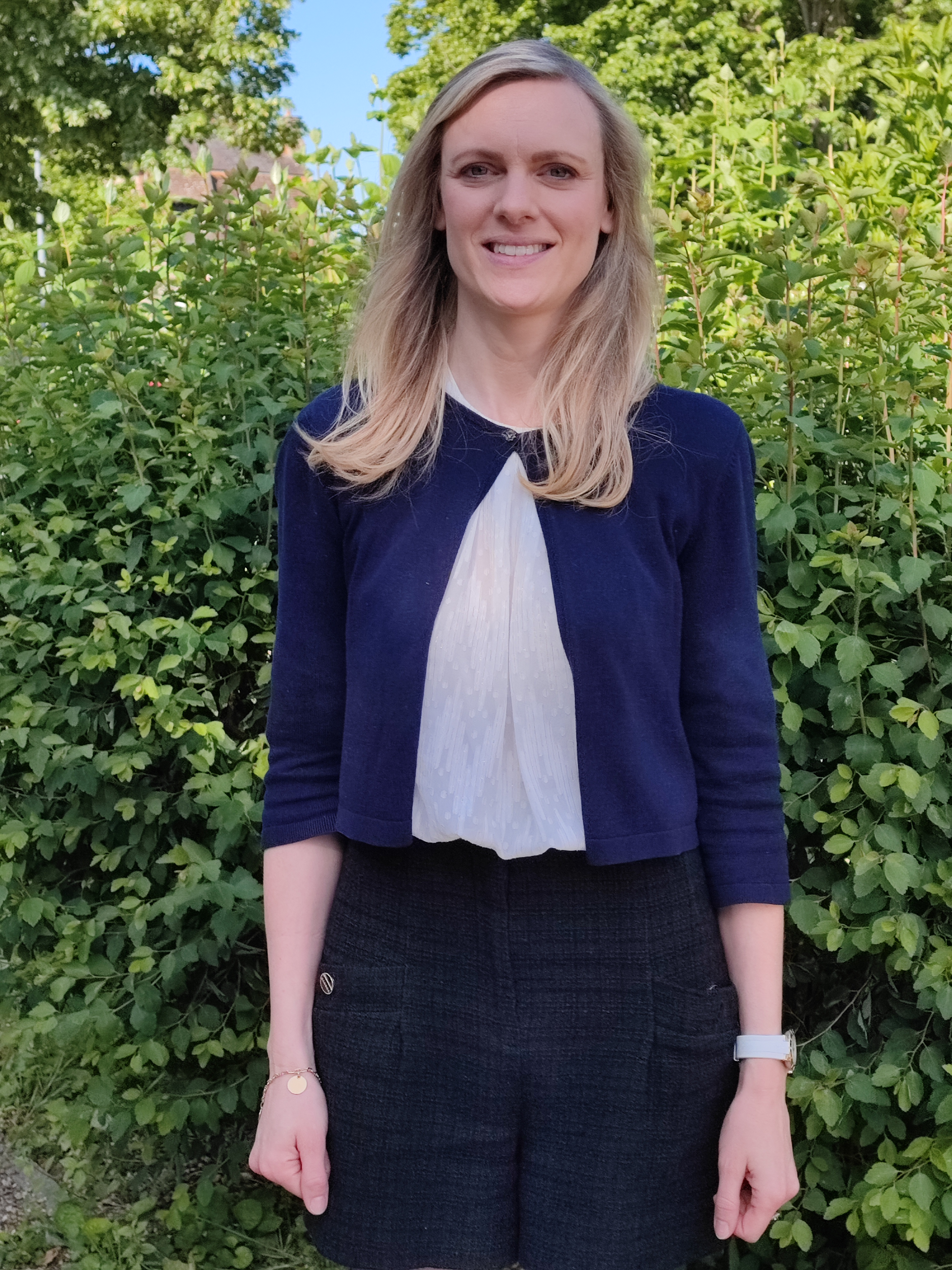

Member of the National Assembly for Loiret's 3rd constituency
- In office 22 June 2022 – 9 June 2024
- Preceded by: Claude de Ganay
- Succeeded by: Constance de Pélichy

Member of the Regional Council of Centre-Val de Loire
- Incumbent
- Assumed office 4 January 2016

Personal details
- Born: 14 January 1985 (age 41) Épinay-sur-Seine, France
- Party: National Rally
- Other political affiliations: Movement for France (before 2011)

Mathilde Paris (French pronunciation: [matild paʁi]; born 14 January 1985) is a French politician who represented the 3rd constituency of the Loiret department in the National Assembly from 2022 to 2024. A member of the National Rally (RN), she has also held a seat in the Regional Council of Centre-Val de Loire since 2016, following her election in 2015.

== Biography ==
Mathilde Paris was born and grew up in the northern Parisian suburb of Épinay-sur-Seine. She worked to further tourism development at the Château de Chambord before founding an interior design business in the city of Blois, Loir-et-Cher. Paris was initially a member and supporter of the Movement for France (MPF) before joining the National Rally (then National Front, FN) in 2011. In 2014, she was elected for the first time to the municipal council of Blois; in 2015 she was elected a regional councillor in Centre-Val de Loire.

In the 2022 legislative election, Paris contested the 3rd constituency of Loiret seat, when she was elected to Parliament in the second round, defeating La République En Marche! (LREM) candidate Karine Barbier-Beauregard. Paris had contested the 2nd constituency of Loir-et-Cher seat in 2017, placing third in the first round.
