= Constance de Pélichy =

French politician (born 1986)

Member of the French National Assembly for Loiret's 3rd constituency
- Incumbent
- Assumed office 18 July 2024
- Preceded by: Mathilde Paris

Personal details
- Born: 1 April 1986 (age 40)
- Party: The Republicans (2015–2022)
- Other political affiliations: Miscellaneous right (2022–present); Union for a Popular Movement (until 2015)

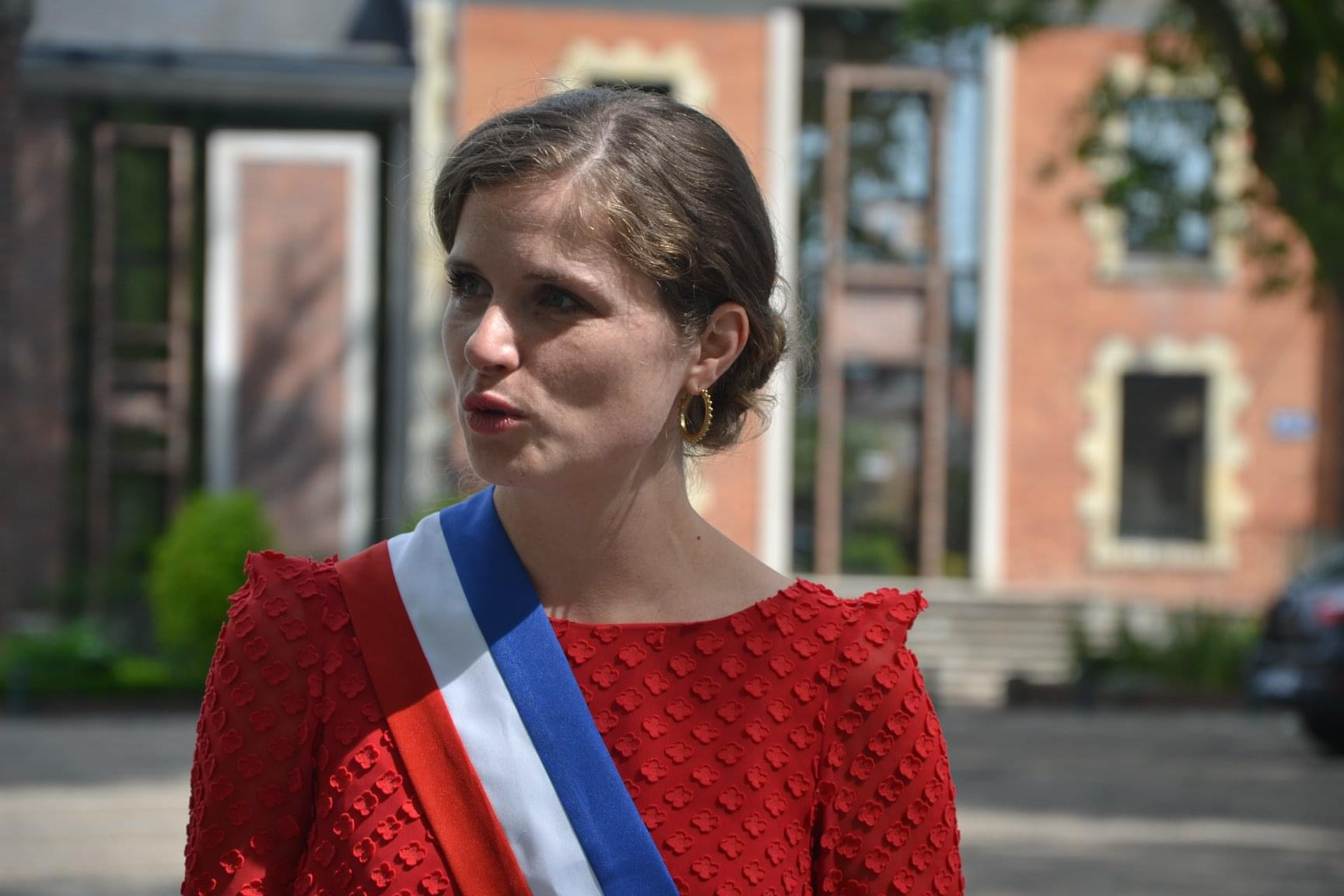
Constance de Pélichy in public

Constance de Pélichy (born 1 April 1986) is a French politician who was elected member of the National Assembly for Loiret's 3rd constituency in 2024. She has served as mayor of La Ferté-Saint-Aubin since 2014, and as a member of the Regional Council of Centre-Val de Loire since 2021. A former member of The Republicans, she left the party in 2022 after Éric Ciotti was elected as its president. She supported Nathalie Kosciusko-Morizet in the party's 2016 presidential primary.
