= Loiret's 3rd constituency =

Constituency of the National Assembly of France

3rd constituency of Loiret
- inline Constituency of the National Assembly of France

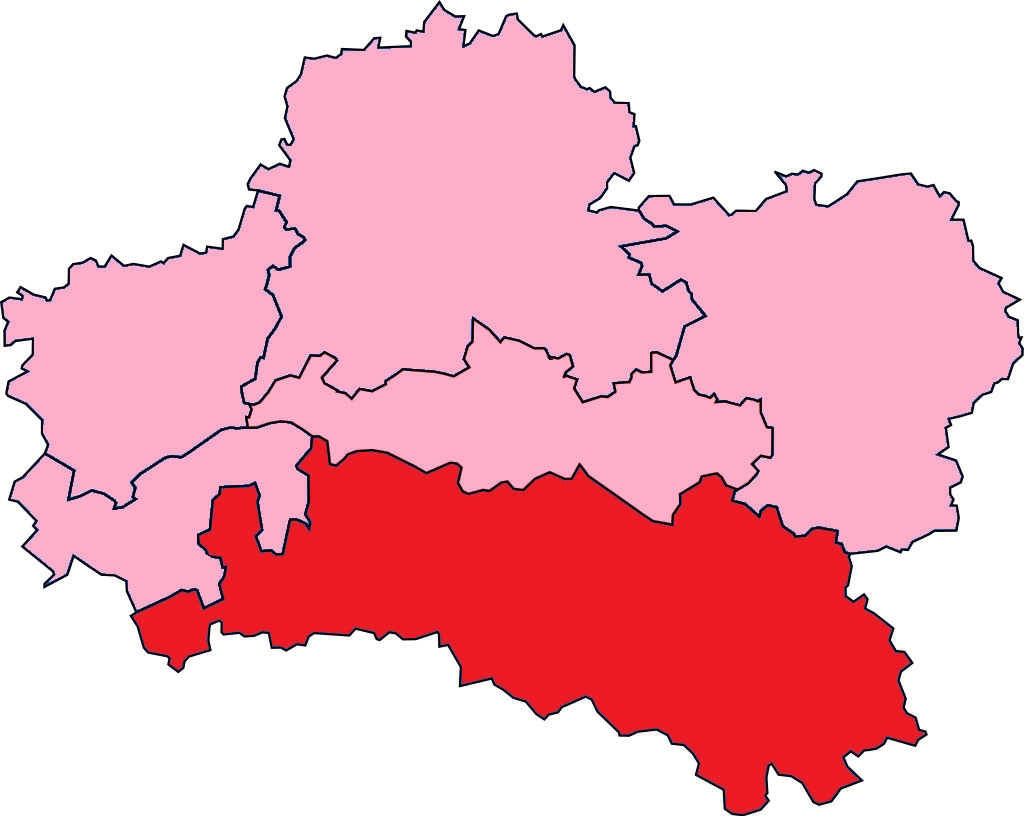
- Loiret's 3rd Constituency shown within Loiret
- Deputy: Constance de Pélichy; DVD
- Department: Loiret
- Cantons: Briare, Châtillon-sur-Loire, La Ferté-Saint-Aubin, Gien, Jargeau, Ouzouer-sur-Loire, Sully-sur-Loire
- Registered voters: 70836

The 3rd constituency of the Loiret (French: Troisième circonscription du Loiret) is a French legislative constituency in the Loiret département. Like the other 576 French constituencies, it elects one MP using a two round electoral system.

== Description ==
The 3rd Constituency of the Loiret lies in the south of the department covering a largely rural area including the town of Sully-sur-Loire upstream on the Loire from Orléans.

With the exception of the 1988 this constituency has continually supported candidates from the centre right. At the 2017 election incumbent Claude de Ganay held off the En Marche! surge by just 59 votes. However, the seat was gained by the far-right RN in 2022.

== Assembly Members ==
Election	Member	Party
1988	Jean-Pierre Lapaire	PS
1993	Jean-Louis Bernard	UDF
1997	Jean-Louis Bernard	UDF
2002	Jean-Louis Bernard	UMP
2007	Jean-Louis Bernard	UMP
2012	Claude de Ganay	UMP
2017	Claude de Ganay	LR
2022	Mathilde Paris	RN
2024	Constance De Pélichy	DVD

== Election results ==
=== 2024 ===
Candidate	Party	Alliance	First round			Second round		
Candidate	Party	Alliance	Votes	%	+/–	Votes	%	+/–
Mathilde Paris	RN		21,373	45.53	+14.71	22,827	48.89	-3.33
Constance De Pélichy	DVD		15,041	32.04	new	23,863	51.11	new
Clément Verde	LFI	NFP	9,089	19.36	+0.15	withdrew		
Thomas Maurice	REC		792	1.69	-1.79			
Michel Naulin	LO		648	1.38	+0.07			
Votes			46,943	100.00		4,690	100.00	
Valid votes			46,943	97.13	-0.69	46,690	96.03	+4.00
Blank votes			1,005	2.08	+0.51	1,427	2.94	-3.23
Null votes			382	0.79	+0.18	501	1.03	-0.77
Turnout			48,330	68.61	+17.45	48,618	69.00	+19.54
Abstentions			22,115	31.39	-17.45	21,841	31.00	-19.54
Registered voters			70,445			70,459		
Result			DVD GAIN FROM RN					

=== 2022 ===
Legislative Election 2022: Loiret's 3rd constituency
Party	Candidate	Votes	%	±%
RN	Mathilde Paris	10,931	30.82	+11.21
MoDem (Ensemble)	Carine Barbier	7,420	20.92	-14.45
LFI (NUPÉS)	Kévin Merlot	6,814	19.21	+1.96
LR	Claude De Ganay	4,502	12.69	−10.94
UDI	Jean-Luc Riglet	3,289	9.27	N/A
REC	Isabelle Lamarque	1,235	3.48	N/A
Others	N/A	1,274	-	−
Turnout		35,465	51.16	+1.20
2nd round result
RN	Mathilde Paris	16,846	52.22	N/A
MoDem (Ensemble)	Carine Barbier	15,416	47.78	−2.12
Turnout		32,262	49.46	+9.26
RN gain from LR				

=== 2017 ===
Legislative Election 2017: Loiret's 3rd constituency
Party	Candidate	Votes	%	±%
LREM	Jihan Chelly	12,519	35.37	
LR	Claude De Ganay	8,364	23.63	
FN	Charles De Gevigney	6,941	19.61	
LFI	Kevin Merlot	3,590	10.14	
EELV	Cédric Petit	1,676	4.74	
PCF	Monique Barret	839	2.37	
Others	N/A	1,462		
Turnout		35,391	49.96	
2nd round result
LR	Claude De Ganay	14,269	50.10	
LREM	Jihan Chelly	14,210	49.90	
Turnout		28,479	40.20	
LR hold				

=== 2012 ===
Legislative Election 2012: Loiret's 3rd constituency
Party	Candidate	Votes	%	±%
PS	Philippe Froment	13,561	31.61	
UMP	Claude De Ganay	12,508	29.16	
FN	Etienne Trapp	7,799	18.18	
DIV	Jean-Pierre Hurtiger	4,957	11.56	
FG	Sylvie Vauvilliers	2,121	4.94	
Others	N/A	1,952		
Turnout		42,898	60.33	
2nd round result
UMP	Claude De Ganay	21,378	52.72	
PS	Philippe Froment	19,170	47.28	
Turnout		40,548	57.02	
UMP hold				

=== 1997 ===
Legislative Election 1993: Loiret's 3rd constituency
Party	Candidate	Votes	%	±%
PRV (UDF)	Jean-Louis Bernard	16,437	32.57	-11.11
PS	Jean-Pierre Lapaire	14,194	28.12	+7.60
FN	Willy Lebrard	8,386	16.62	+2.85
PCF	Sylvie Prat	3,400	6.74	+0.08
DIV	Philippe Clément	1,980	3.92	N/A
LDI	Jean-Charles Benaich	1,796	3.56	N/A
LO	Abdelkrim Saadini	1,281	2.54	+1.09
GE	Pascal Bouclet	1,094	2.17	N/A
Others	N/A	1,901	3.76	N/A
Turnout		53,163	68.02	−3.30
Registered electors		78,158		
2nd round result
PRV (UDF)	Jean-Louis Bernard	27,987	52.64	-8.63
PS	Jean-Pierre Lapaire	25,180	47.36	+8.63
Turnout		56,759	72.62	+2.01
Registered electors		78,156		
PRV hold				

=== 1993 ===
Legislative Election 1993: Loiret's 3rd constituency
Party	Candidate	Votes	%	±%
UDF	Jean-Louis Bernard	22,596	43.68	
PS	Jean-Pierre Lapaire	10,617	20.52	
FN	Michel Rothe	7,122	13.77	
LV	Nicole Bouilly	4,595	8.88	
PCF	Marcel Thomas	3,446	6.66	
NERNA	Francois Lacaille	1,742	3.37	
EXG	Jack Foucher	865	1.67	
LO	Abdelkrim Saadani	749	1.45	
Turnout		54,576	71.32	
Registered electors		76,523		
2nd round result
UDF	Jean-Louis Bernard	30,813	61.27	
PS	Jean-Pierre Lapaire	19,480	38.73	
Turnout		54,028	70.61	
Registered electors		76,521		
UDF gain from PS				
