= Francis Hammel =

French politician (1950–2021)

Deputy of Somme's 4th constituency
- In office 12 June 1997 – 18 June 2002
- Preceded by: Joël Hart
- Succeeded by: Joël Hart

Personal details
- Born: 11 December 1950 Saint-Valery-sur-Somme, France
- Died: 6 January 2021 (aged 70)
- Party: PS; MRC; UMP; LREM

Francis Hammel (11 December 1950 – 6 January 2021) was a French politician.

== Biography ==
An agricultural director and educator, Hammel first became a Deputy in 1997, succeeding Joël Hart. In 2002, he lost his seat to Hart, and tried in vain in 2007 to regain the seat. He also served on the municipal council of Abbeville, running with the Union for a Popular Movement. However, he resigned from his position after only a few days.

Francis Hammel died on 6 January 2021 at the age of 70.
