= Jean-Philippe Tanguy =

French politician (born 1986)

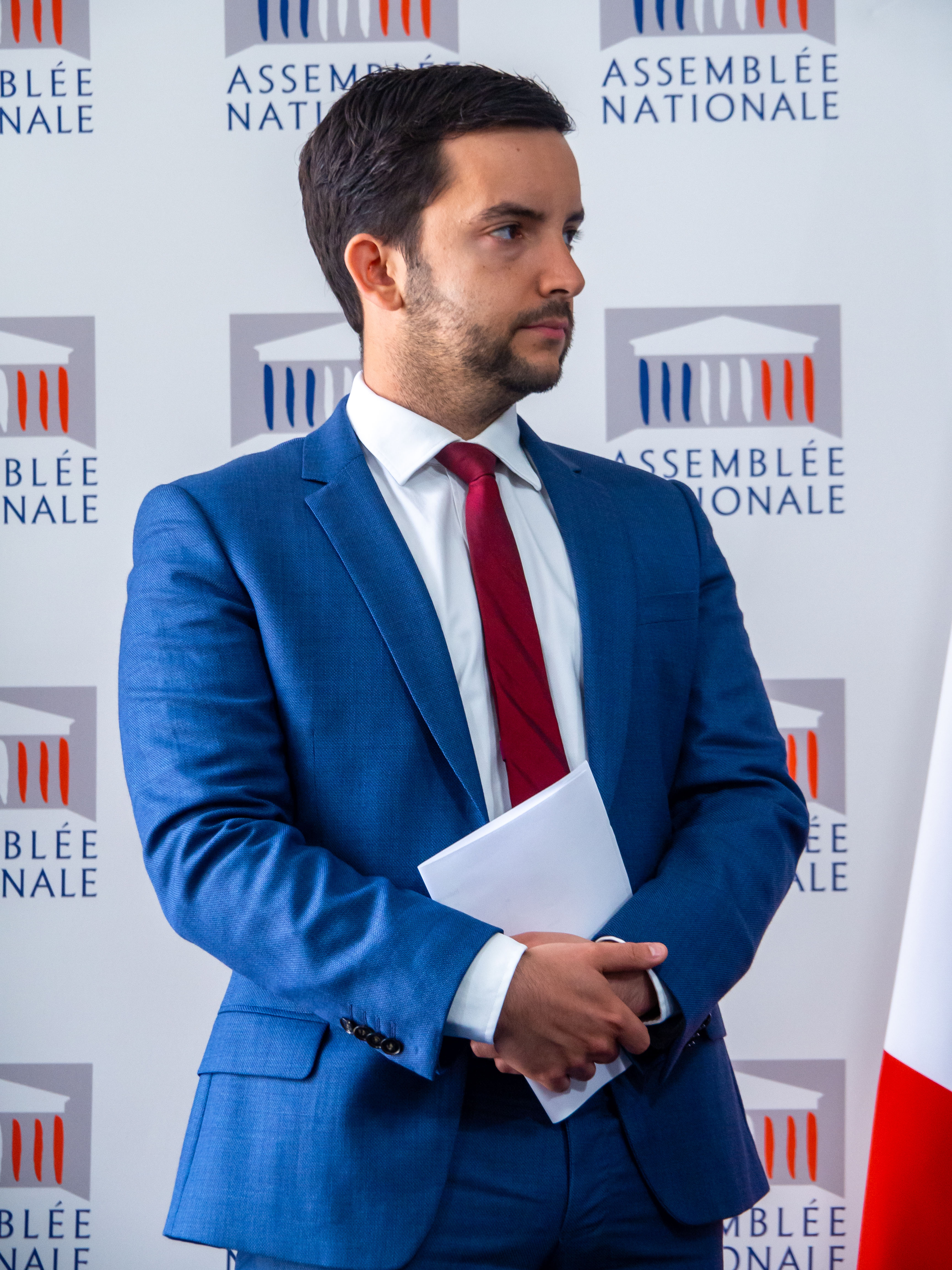

Member of the National Assembly for Somme's 4th constituency
- Incumbent
- Assumed office 22 June 2022
- Preceded by: Jean-Claude Leclabart

Personal details
- Born: 25 March 1986 (age 40) Boulogne-sur-Mer, France
- Party: National Rally (2020–present)
- Other political affiliations: Debout la France (2012–2020)
- Education: Lycée Henri-IV
- Alma mater: ESSEC Business School; Sciences Po

Jean-Philippe Tanguy (French pronunciation: [ʒɑ̃filip tɑ̃ɡi]; born 25 March 1986) is a French politician who has represented the 4th constituency of the Somme department in the National Assembly since 2022. He is a member of the National Rally (RN).

== Biography ==
=== Early life and education ===
Tanguy was born in 1986 in Boulogne-sur-Mer. His mother is a secretary and his father is an industrial site manager.

He received his Baccalauréat at the Lycée Henri-IV and began studies at the École Spéciale Militaire de Saint-Cyr military academy but dropped out and studied degrees at ESSEC Business School and Sciences Po in Paris earning a Master of Public Affairs. He then worked as a specialist in the industrial and energy sectors.

=== Political career ===
Tanguy joined Debout la France and unsuccessfully contested for the party during the 2015 regional elections in Nord-Pas-de-Calais-Picardie. He worked on Nicolas Dupont-Aignan's campaign during the 2017 French presidential election and according to Mediapart tried to forge an alliance between Dupont-Aignan and Marine Le Pen.

He joined the National Rally in 2020 and during the 2022 French presidential election was a deputy campaign manager for Marine Le Pen. For the 2022 French legislative election he contested Somme's 4th constituency and defeated outgoing deputy Jean-Claude Leclabart. He was re-elected in the early parliamentary elections of 2024 with 57.47% of the vote.
