= Chantal Leblanc =

French politician

Chantal Leblanc (2 February 1945 in Lille – 29 April 2015 in Abbeville) was a French politician and communist. A member of the French Communist Party, she was the first female MP to wear trousers in the National Assembly chambers.

She was elected to the French National Assembly in 1978, serving as députée for the Somme's 4th constituency. She would serve as a députée until 1981.

From 1983 to 2008, she served as a municipal councillor in Abbeville, including a stint as deputy mayor from 1989 to 1995. From 1986 to 2004, she additionally served as a regional councillor for Picardie.

After her death in 2015, a square in Abbeville was renamed in her honour.
