= Claude de Ganay =

French politician

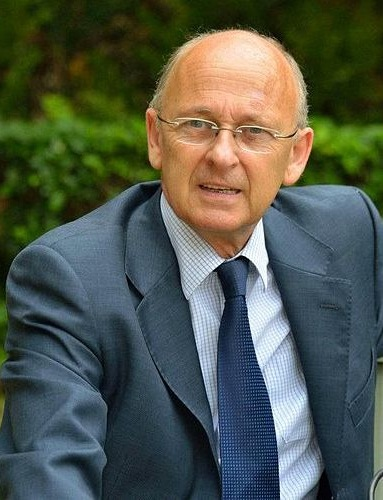

Member of the National Assembly for Loiret's 3rd constituency
- In office 20 June 2012 – 22 June 2022
- Preceded by: Jean-Louis Bernard
- Succeeded by: Mathilde Paris

Personal details
- Born: 5 September 1953 (age 72) Paris, France
- Party: The Republicans

Claude de Ganay (born 5 September 1953) is a French politician representing The Republicans. He was elected to the French National Assembly on 18 June 2017, representing Loiret's 3rd constituency.

== Political career ==
In parliament, De Ganay serves on the Defence Committee. In addition to his committee assignments, he is a member of the French-Mauritanian Parliamentary Friendship Group. In the Republicans' 2016 presidential primaries, De Ganay endorsed Bruno Le Maire as the party's candidate for the office of President of France. Ahead of the 2022 presidential elections, he publicly declared his support for Michel Barnier as the Republicans’ candidate.

He lost his seat in the first round of the 2022 French legislative election.

== See also ==
- 2017 French legislative election
