= Loiret's 6th constituency =

Constituency of the National Assembly of France

6th constituency of Loiret
- inline Constituency of the National Assembly of France

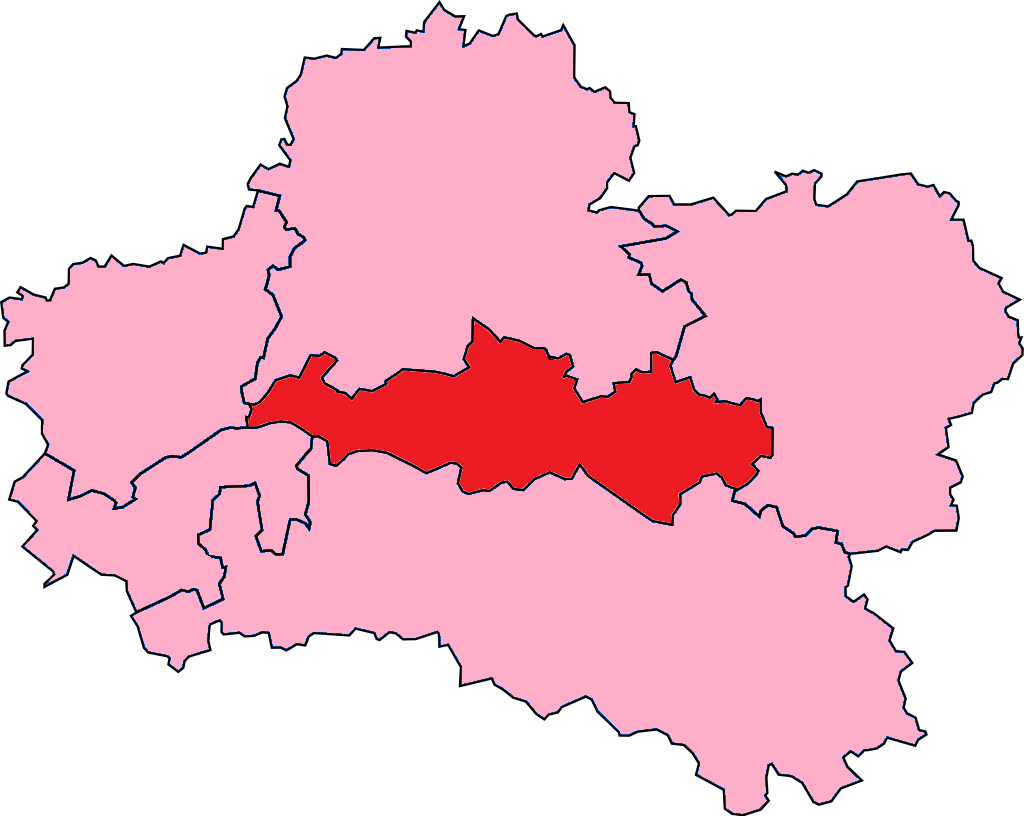
- Loiret's 6th Constituency shown within Loiret
- Deputy: Richard Ramos; MoDem
- Department: Loiret
- Cantons: Châteauneuf-sur-Loire, Chécy, Lorris, Orléans-Bourgogne, Orléans-Saint-Marc-Argonne, Saint-Jean-de-Braye
- Registered voters: 71880

The 6th constituency of the Loiret (French: Sixième circonscription du Loiret) is a French legislative constituency in the Loiret département. Like the other 576 French constituencies, it elects one MP using a two round electoral system.

== Description ==
The 6th Constituency of the Loiret was created as a result of the 2010 redistricting of French legislative constituencies. The seat includes the eastern parts of Orléans as well as a large part of the rural centre of the department.

This constituency was the only one in Loiret to elect a left wing candidate at the 2012 election before opting for the centrist MoDem as part of the Emmanuel Macron supporting coalition in 2017.

== Assembly Members ==
Election	Member	Party
2012	Valérie Corre	PS
2017	Richard Ramos	MoDem
2022	Richard Ramos	MoDem
2024	Richard Ramos	MoDem

== Election results ==
=== 2024 ===
Candidate	Party	Alliance	First round			Second round		
Candidate	Party	Alliance	Votes	%	+/–	Votes	%	+/–
Anthony Zeller	RN		16,253	31.81	+12.27	18,392	36.69	new
Richard Ramos	MoDEM	Ensemble	15,635	30.60	-1.78	31,737	63.31	+6.04
Christophe Lavialle	PS	NFP	15,176	29.70	+4.18	withdrew		
Jean-Luc Poisson	LR	UDC	2,239	4.38	-5.30			
Isabelle Lamarque	REC		664	1.30	-2.21			
Annie Berthault-Korzhyk	DIV		595	1.16	new			
David Choquel	LO		528	1.03	+0.08			
Votes			51,090	100.00		50,129	100.00	
Valid votes			51,090	97.69	-0.09	50,129	95.78	+4.30
Blank votes			867	1.66	+0.06	1,676	3.20	-2.92
Null votes			340	0.65	+0.03	530	1.01	-1.39
Turnout			52,297	68.74	+18.95	52,335	68.77	+20.88
Abstentions			23,787	31.26	-18.95	23,769	31.23	-20.88
Registered voters			76,084			76,104		
Result			MoDEM HOLD					

=== 2022 ===
Legislative Election 2022: Loiret's 6th constituency
Party	Candidate	Votes	%	±%
MoDem (Ensemble)	Richard Ramos	11,851	32.38	-3.05
LFI (NUPÉS)	Olivier Hicter	9,339	25.52	+3.42
RN	Carla Boubekeur	7,152	19.54	+8.87
LR (UDC)	Chrystel de Filippi	3,542	9.68	−7.28
REC	Anna Khelil	1,283	3.51	N/A
DIV	Gaël Baumgartner	1,260	3.44	N/A
Others	N/A	2,168	-	−
Turnout		36,595	49.79	+0.64
2nd round result
MoDem (Ensemble)	Richard Ramos	18,865	57.27	+4.58
LFI (NUPÉS)	Olivier Hicter	14,073	42.73	N/A
Turnout		32,938	47.89	+9.92
MoDem hold				

=== 2017 ===
Legislative Election 2017: Loiret's 6th constituency
Party	Candidate	Votes	%	±%
MoDem	Richard Ramos	12,841	35.43	
UDI	Alexandrine Leclerc	6,149	16.96	
PS	Valérie Corre	5,794	15.99	
FN	Myriam Bachir	4,229	11.67	
LFI	Jérôme Schmitt	3,585	9.89	
Others	N/A	3,648		
Turnout		36,246	50.43	
2nd round result
MoDem	Richard Ramos	14,379	52.69	
UDI	Alexandrine Leclerc	12,911	47.31	
Turnout		27,290	37.97	
MoDem gain from PS				

=== 2012 ===
Legislative Election 2012: Loiret's 6th constituency
Party	Candidate	Votes	%	±%
PS	Valérie Corre	14,386	35.64	
UMP	Charles-Eric Lemaignen	10,659	26.41	
FN	Elizabeth Alagnoux	6,509	16.13	
NM	Florent Montillot	4,194	10.39	
FG	Olivier Hicter	2,162	5.36	
MoDem	Laurence Duval	1,363	3.38	
Others	N/A	1,090		
Turnout		40,363	58.30	
2nd round result
PS	Valérie Corre	19,541	50.14	
UMP	Charles-Eric Lemaignen	19,430	49.86	
Turnout		38,971	56.31	
PS win (new seat)				
