= Loiret's 4th constituency =

Constituency of the National Assembly of France

- inline Constituency of the National Assembly of France

- constituency in department

- Loiret in France
- Member: Thomas Ménagé; RN
- Department: Loiret
- Cantons: Amilly, Châlette-sur-Loing, Château-Renard, Châtillon-Coligny, Courtenay, Ferrières, Montargis
- Registered voters: 74,643 (2017)

Loiret's 4th constituency is a French legislative constituency in Loiret.

A by-election was held in the constituency in 2018 after the election of Jean-Pierre Door was annulled. Door was re-elected at the by-election.

== Deputies ==
| Election | Deputy | Party |
|---|---|---|
| 1988 | Xavier Deniau | RPR |
| 1993 | Xavier Deniau | RPR |
| 1997 | Xavier Deniau | RPR |
| 2002 | Jean-Pierre Door | UMP |
| 2007 | Jean-Pierre Door | UMP |
| 2012 | Jean-Pierre Door | UMP |
| 2017 | Jean-Pierre Door | LR |
| 2018 | Jean-Pierre Door | LR |
| 2022 | Thomas Ménagé | RN |
| 2024 | Thomas Ménagé | RN |

== Election results ==
=== 2024 ===
| Candidate | Party | Alliance | First round | | | Second round | | |
| Candidate | Party | Alliance | Votes | % | +/– | Votes | % | +/– |
|---|---|---|---|---|---|---|---|---|
| Thomas Ménagé | RN | | 23,231 | 49.65 | +18.20 | 26,947 | 62.59 | -0.77 |
| Bruno Nottin | PCF | NFP | 9,889 | 21.14 | +1.71 | 16,104 | 37.41 | +0.77 |
| Mélusine Harlé | RE | Ensemble | 7,029 | 15.02 | -3.87 | | | |
| Ariel Lévy | LR | UDC | 5,537 | 11.83 | -2.51 | | | |
| Dominique Clergue | LO | | 551 | 1.18 | -0.03 | | | |
| Georges Loubert | REC | | 535 | 1.14 | -2.20 | | | |
| Françoise Roche | DIV | | 13 | 0.03 | new | | | |
| Votes | | | 46,785 | 100.00 | | 43,051 | 100.00 | |
| Valid votes | | | 46,785 | 97.38 | -0.33 | 43,051 | 90.60 | +3.20 |
| Blank votes | | | 955 | 1.99 | +0.34 | 3,419 | 7.20 | -2.14 |
| Null votes | | | 305 | 0.63 | -0.01 | 1,047 | 2.20 | -1.06 |
| Turnout | | | 48,045 | 64.84 | +17.05 | 47,517 | 64.11 | +18.06 |
| Abstentions | | | 26,054 | 35.16 | -17.05 | 26,596 | 35.89 | -18.06 |
| Registered voters | | | 74,099 | | | 74,113 | | |
| Result | | | RN HOLD | | | | | |

=== 2022 ===
Legislative Election 2022: Loiret's 4th constituency
| Party | Candidate | Votes | % | ±% |
|---|---|---|---|---|
| RN | Thomas Ménagé | 10,986 | 31.45 | +17.57 |
| PCF (NUPÉS) | Bruno Nottin | 6,789 | 19.43 | +1.86 |
| LREM (Ensemble) | Jean-Michel Blanquer | 6,600 | 18.89 | −1.31 |
| LR (UDC) | Ariel Lévy | 5,008 | 14.34 | −23.86 |
| LMR | Philippe Moreau | 1,707 | 4.89 | N/A |
| DIV | Olivier Rohaut | 1,178 | 3.37 | N/A |
| REC | Alexandre Cuignache | 1,166 | 3.34 | N/A |
| Others | N/A | 1,500 | - | − |
| Turnout | | 34,934 | 47.79 | +17.43 |
2nd round result
| RN | Thomas Ménagé | 19,087 | 63.36 | N/A |
| PCF (NUPÉS) | Bruno Nottin | 11,037 | 36.64 | N/A |
| Turnout | | 30,124 | 46.05 | +17.44 |
| RN gain from LR | | | | |

=== 2018 by-election ===
2018 by-election First round results by commune

2018 by-election Second round results by commune

| Candidate | Party | First round | | | Second round | | |
| Candidate | Party | Votes | % | +/– | Votes | % | +/– |
|---|---|---|---|---|---|---|---|
| Jean-Pierre Door | LR–UDI | 8,330 | 38.20 | +14.41 | 12,632 | 67.08 | +17.07 |
| Mélusine Harlé | REM | 4,406 | 20.20 | –8.35 | 6,199 | 32.92 | –17.07 |
| Ludovic Marchetti | FN | 3,026 | 13.88 | –6.91 | | | |
| Jalila Gaboret | PS | 1,450 | 6.65 | +1.17 | | | |
| Bruno Nottin | PCF–EELV | 1,300 | 5.96 | –5.64 | | | |
| Luc Bucheton | DLF | 1,140 | 5.23 | +2.22 | | | |
| Jérôme Schmitt | FI | 1,081 | 4.96 | +4.96 | | | |
| Joël-Pierre Chevreux | ECO | 427 | 1.96 | +1.96 | | | |
| Dominique Clergue | LO | 349 | 1.60 | +0.64 | | | |
| Laurent Chaillou | UPR | 177 | 0.81 | +0.16 | | | |
| Nicolas Rousseaux | EXD | 93 | 0.43 | +0.43 | | | |
| Frédéric Chaouat | SE | 29 | 0.13 | +0.13 | | | |
| Votes | | 21,808 | 100.00 | – | 18,831 | 100.00 | – |
| Valid votes | | 21,808 | 96.97 | –0.90 | 18,831 | 88.88 | –1.05 |
| Blank votes | | 442 | 1.97 | +0.46 | 1,492 | 7.04 | –0.11 |
| Null votes | | 239 | 1.06 | +0.44 | 865 | 4.08 | +1.17 |
| Turnout | | 22,489 | 30.36 | –18.60 | 21,188 | 28.61 | –14.76 |
| Abstentions | | 51,574 | 69.64 | +18.60 | 52,866 | 71.39 | +14.76 |
| Registered voters | | 74,063 | | | 74,054 | | |
Source: Préfecture du Loiret

=== 2017 ===
| Candidate | Label | First round | | Second round | |
| Candidate | Label | Votes | % | Votes | % |
|---|---|---|---|---|---|
| Mélusine Harlé | REM | 10,215 | 28.56 | 14,553 | 49.99 |
| Jean-Pierre Door | LR | 8,507 | 23.78 | 14,561 | 50.01 |
| Ludovic Marchetti | FN | 7,434 | 20.78 | | |
| Franck Demaumont | PCF | 4,148 | 11.60 | | |
| Jalila Gaboret | PS | 1,961 | 5.48 | | |
| Luc Bucheton | DLF | 1,075 | 3.01 | | |
| Alphonse Proffit | DIV | 849 | 2.37 | | |
| Massila Salemkour | ECO | 813 | 2.27 | | |
| Dominique Clergue | EXG | 343 | 0.96 | | |
| Zoé Baron | DIV | 234 | 0.65 | | |
| Christine Rochoux | DVD | 191 | 0.53 | | |
| Votes | | 35,770 | 100.00 | 29,114 | 100.00 |
| Valid votes | | 35,770 | 97.87 | 29,114 | 89.93 |
| Blank votes | | 551 | 1.51 | 2,316 | 7.15 |
| Null votes | | 226 | 0.62 | 944 | 2.92 |
| Turnout | | 36,547 | 48.96 | 32,374 | 43.37 |
| Abstentions | | 38,100 | 51.04 | 42,269 | 56.63 |
| Registered voters | | 74,647 | | 74,643 | |
Source: Ministry of the Interior

=== 2012 ===
Legislative Election 2012: Loiret's 4th constituency
| Party | Candidate | Votes | % | ±% |
|---|---|---|---|---|
| UMP | Jean-Pierre Door | 16,824 | 38.54 | |
| PS | Jalila Gaboret | 11,107 | 25.44 | |
| FN | Bernard Chauvet | 9,083 | 20.81 | |
| FG | Franck Demaumont | 4,477 | 10.26 | |
| Others | N/A | 2,164 | | |
| Turnout | | 43,655 | 58.20 | |
2nd round result
| UMP | Jean-Pierre Door | 23,478 | 57.81 | |
| PS | Jalila Gaboret | 17,133 | 42.19 | |
| Turnout | | 40,611 | 54.14 | |
| UMP hold | | | | |

=== 2007 ===
Legislative Election 2007: Loiret's 4th constituency
| Party | Candidate | Votes | % | ±% |
|---|---|---|---|---|
| UMP | Jean-Pierre Door | 28,469 | 51.14 | +6.37 |
| PS | François Bonneau | 11,974 | 21.51 | ±0.00 |
| FN | Bernard Chauvet | 3,888 | 6.98 | −8.93 |
| MoDem | Monique Bosset | 3,272 | 5.88 | N/A |
| PCF | Sylvie Vauvillers | 2,312 | 4.15 | −2.58 |
| LV | Franck Thieblemont | 1,294 | 2.32 | N/A |
| Others | N/A | 4,457 | 8.02 | N/A |
| Turnout | | 56,666 | 60.51 | −4.27 |
| Registered electors | | 93,646 | | |
| UMP hold | | | | |

=== 2002 ===
Legislative Election 2002: Loiret's 4th constituency
| Party | Candidate | Votes | % | ±% |
|---|---|---|---|---|
| UMP | Jean-Pierre Door | 25,126 | 44.77 | +23.86 |
| PS | Liliane Berthelier | 12,071 | 21.51 | +3.72 |
| FN | Bernard Chauvet | 8,929 | 15.91 | −3.40 |
| PCF | Jacques Reboul | 3,747 | 6.68 | −8.47 |
| CPNT | Jean-Michel François | 1,873 | 3.34 | N/A |
| MNR | Maurice Etienne | 1,419 | 2.53 | N/A |
| LO | Dominique Clergue | 1,215 | 2.17 | −0.62 |
| LCR | Françoise Leclercq | 876 | 1.56 | N/A |
| MPF | Bernard Lhomme | 863 | 1.54 | −0.88 |
| Turnout | | 57,372 | 64.78 | −4.13 |
| Registered electors | | 88,569 | | |
2nd round result
| UMP | Jean-Pierre Door | 31,664 | 63.36 | −2.38 |
| PS | Liliane Berthelier | 18,314 | 36.64 | +2.38 |
| Turnout | | 52,364 | 59.13 | −9.32 |
| Registered electors | | 88,562 | | |
| UMP hold | | | | |

=== 1997 ===
Legislative Election 1997: Loiret's 4th constituency
| Party | Candidate | Votes | % | ±% |
|---|---|---|---|---|
| RPR | Xavier Deniau | 11,818 | 20.91 | −16.41 |
| FN | Maurice Etieene | 10,916 | 19.31 | +5.05 |
| PS | François Bonneau | 10,058 | 17.79 | +7.73 |
| PCF | Max Nublat | 8,562 | 15.15 | +0.48 |
| RPR | Jean-Charles Paré* | 7,334 | 12.97 | N/A |
| FD (UDF) | Frédéric Bauche** | 1,631 | 2.89 | N/A |
| LO | Annie Cassin | 1,578 | 2.79 | +0.88 |
| LDI | Muriel Mercadier-Girardin | 1,370 | 2.42 | N/A |
| GE | Martine Paudex | 1,249 | 2.21 | N/A |
| LV | Jean-Luc Burgunder | 1,222 | 2.16 | −0.16 |
| MEI | Thierry Lavoux | 568 | 1.00 | N/A |
| DVD | Jacques-Eric Tazartes | 222 | 0.39 | N/A |
| Turnout | | 59,397 | 68.91 | −2.61 |
| Registered electors | | 86,196 | | |
2nd round result
| RPR | Xavier Deniau | 32,378 | 65.74 | +2.30 |
| FN | Maurice Etieene | 16,877 | 34.26 | N/A |
| Turnout | | 58,986 | 68.45 | −0.64 |
| Registered electors | | 86,179 | | |
| RPR hold | | | | |

* RPR dissident without the support of their party
** FD/UDF dissident without the support of their party or alliance

=== 1993 ===
Legislative Election 1993: Loiret's 4th constituency
| Party | Candidate | Votes | % | ±% |
|---|---|---|---|---|
| RPR | Xavier Deniau | 21,791 | 37.32 | |
| PCF | Max Nubalt | 8,566 | 14.67 | |
| FN | Maurice Etienne | 8,328 | 14.26 | |
| DVD | Jean-Charles Pare | 7,436 | 12.73 | |
| PS | Albert Mimoun | 5,877 | 10.06 | |
| LV | Jean-Luc Burgunder | 3,266 | 5.59 | |
| NERNA | Anne-Marie Ernst | 1,356 | 2.32 | |
| LO | Annie Cassin | 1,115 | 1.91 | |
| EXG | Christine Lander | 656 | 1.12 | |
| Turnout | | 61,237 | 71.52 | |
| Registered electors | | 85,624 | | |
2nd round result
| RPR | Xavier Deniau | 34,547 | 63.44 | |
| PCF | Max Nubalt | 19,910 | 36.56 | |
| Turnout | | 59,146 | 69.09 | |
| Registered electors | | 85,605 | | |
| RPR hold | | | | |
