= Richard Ramos =

French politician (born 1968)

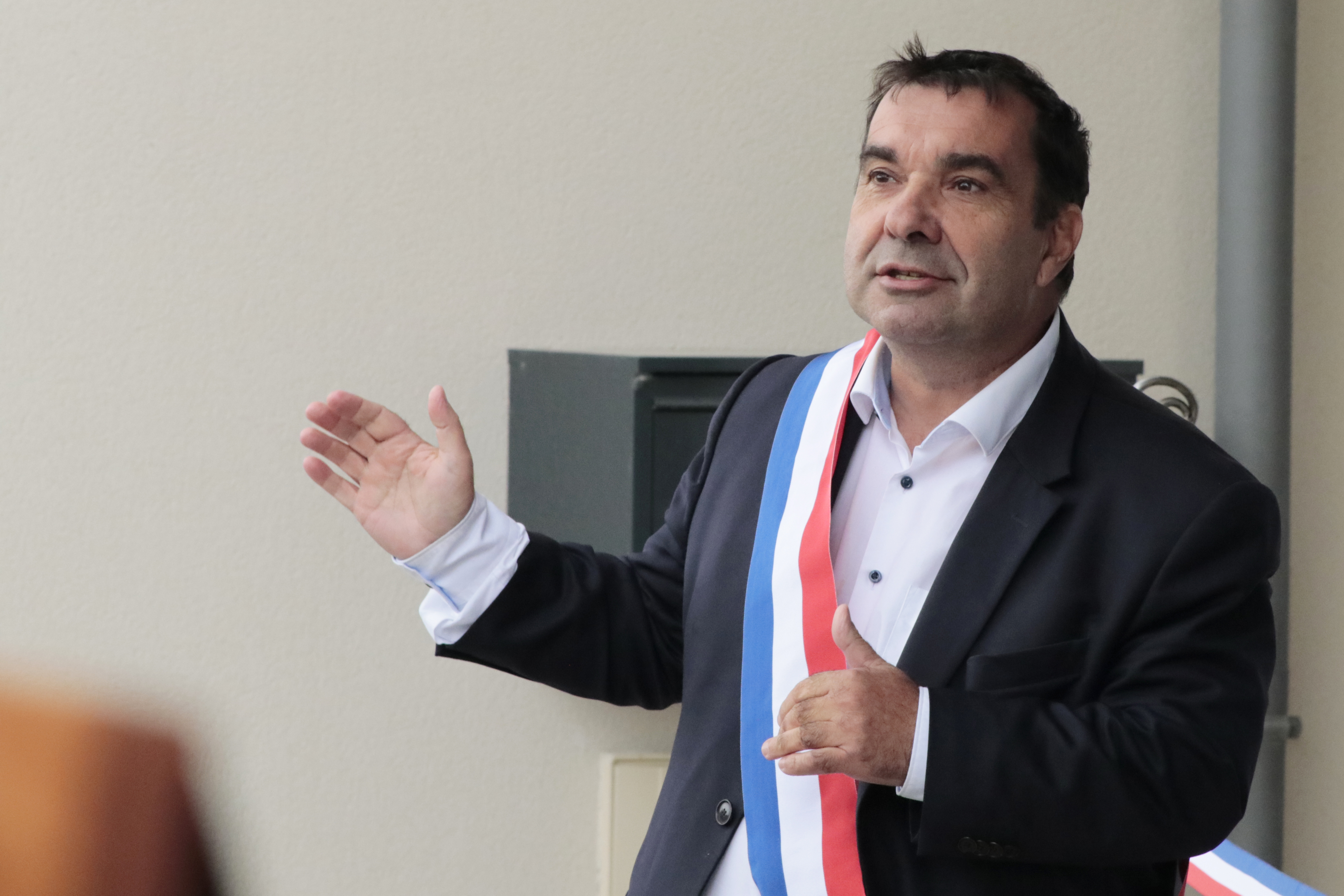

Member of the National Assembly for Loiret's 6th constituency
- Incumbent
- Assumed office 21 June 2017
- Preceded by: Valérie Corre

Personal details
- Born: 21 March 1968 (age 58) Blois, France
- Party: Democratic Movement

Richard Ramos (French pronunciation: [ʁiʃaʁ ʁamɔs]; born 21 March 1968) is a French restaurant critic and politician of the Democratic Movement (MoDem) who has represented the 6th constituency of Loiret in the National Assembly since 2017.

== Early career ==
Before entering politics full-time, Ramos worked as restaurant critic for France 3.

== Political career ==
Ramos has been a member of the Democratic Movement since 2008. He started his political career as a municipal councillor of Fay-aux-Loges from 2008 to 2020.

He was elected to the National Assembly in the 6th constituency of Loiret in the 2017 with the support of La République En Marche! (LREM). He was re-elected in 2022 and 2024, both times under the Ensemble coalition. In 2024 he placed second in the first round, then defeated National Rally (RN) candidate Anthony Zeller in the second round.

In Parliament, Ramos serves as a member of the Committee on Economic Affairs. In addition to his committee assignments, he was part of the French-Algerian Parliamentary Friendship Group and the French-Moroccan Parliamentary Friendship Group. In 2024, he became the inaugural president of the French-Palestinian Parliamentary Friendship Group.

== Political positions ==
In July 2019, Ramos voted against the French ratification of the European Union's Comprehensive Economic and Trade Agreement (CETA) with Canada.

In January 2023, he called the 2023 French pension reform law "unjust" and said he would oppose it.

In September 2024, amid the 2024–2025 French political crisis, Ramos criticised President Emmanuel Macron heavily, stating: "There are two things the French hate: political parties and the President of the Republic". In October 2025 he called him "crazy" and said he had a "personal psyche problem".

== Bibliography ==
- "Le coup de gueule des députés artificiers", in Hallier, tout feu tout flamme, Jean-Pierre Thiollet, Neva Editions, 2023, p. 51-57. ISBN 978-2-35055-309-2
