= Jean-Pierre Door =

French politician

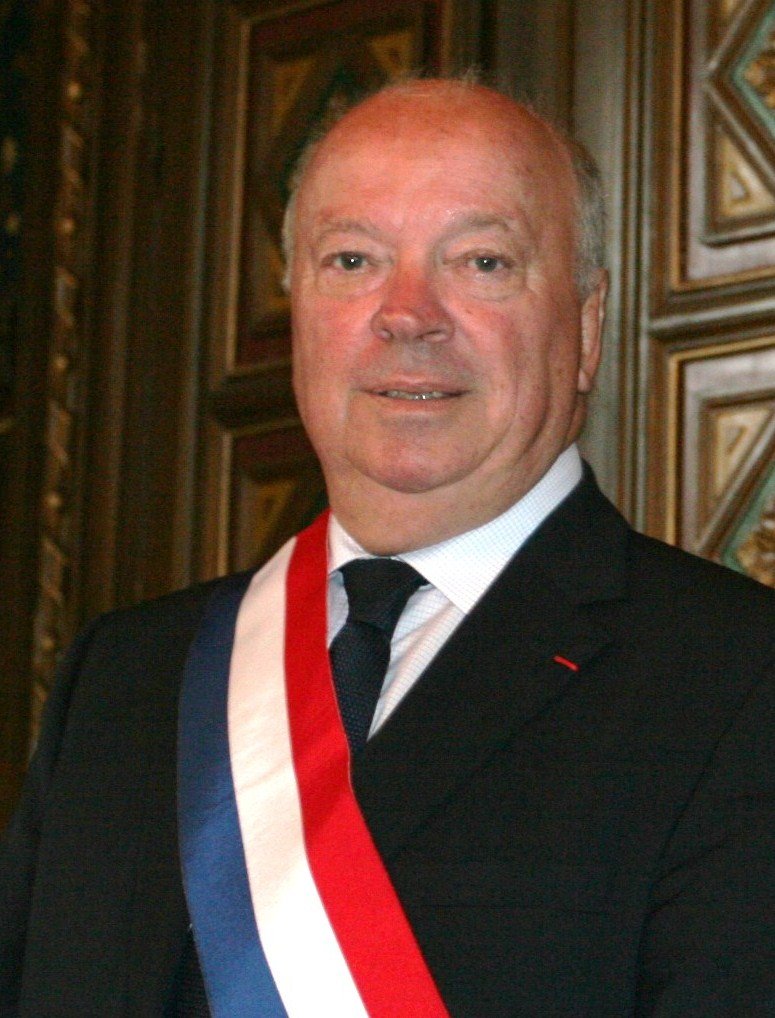

Member of the National Assembly for Loiret's 4th constituency
- In office 26 March 2018 – 21 June 2022
- Succeeded by: Thomas Ménagé
- In office 2002–2017
- Preceded by: Xavier Deniau

Personal details
- Born: 1 April 1942 (age 84) Sully-sur-Loire, France
- Party: The Republicans
- Profession: Cardiologist

Jean-Pierre Door (born 1 April 1942, in Sully-sur-Loire) is a member of the National Assembly of France. He represents the Loiret department, and is a member of The Republicans.

He won the 2018 Loiret's 4th constituency by-election.
