= Virginie Klès =

French politician

Virginie Klès (born 18 August 1961) is a former member of the Senate of France. She represented the Ille-et-Vilaine department, and is related to the Socialist Party.

== Biography ==
Toxicological veterinarian by profession, Virginia Klès was elected mayor of Châteaubourg (Ille-et-Vilaine) following the municipal elections of 2001 in a three-way race against the exiting mayor and a socialist candidate. She was re-elected in 2008. She then became vice-president of the Communauté d'agglomération de Vitré-Communauté. She was elected senator on September 21, 2008 and did not run for reelection in 2014.
