= Jean-Louis Bernard =

French politician (1938–2020)

Mayor of Orléans
- In office 1 October 1988 – 19 March 1989
- Preceded by: Jacques Douffiagues
- Succeeded by: Jean-Pierre Sueur

Member of the National Assembly for Loiret's 3rd constituency
- In office 1993–2012
- Preceded by: Jean-Pierre Lapaire
- Succeeded by: Claude de Ganay

Personal details
- Born: 31 March 1938 Saulieu, France
- Died: 25 March 2020 (aged 81) Orléans, France
- Party: UMP
- Profession: Surgeon

Jean-Louis Bernard (31 March 1938 – 25 March 2020) was a member of the National Assembly of France. and represented the Loiret department. He was born in Saulieu, Côte-d'Or, and was a member of the Radical Party and worked in association with the Union for a Popular Movement. He was the mayor of Orléans from 1988 to 1989.
