= François Bonneau =

French politician (born 1953)

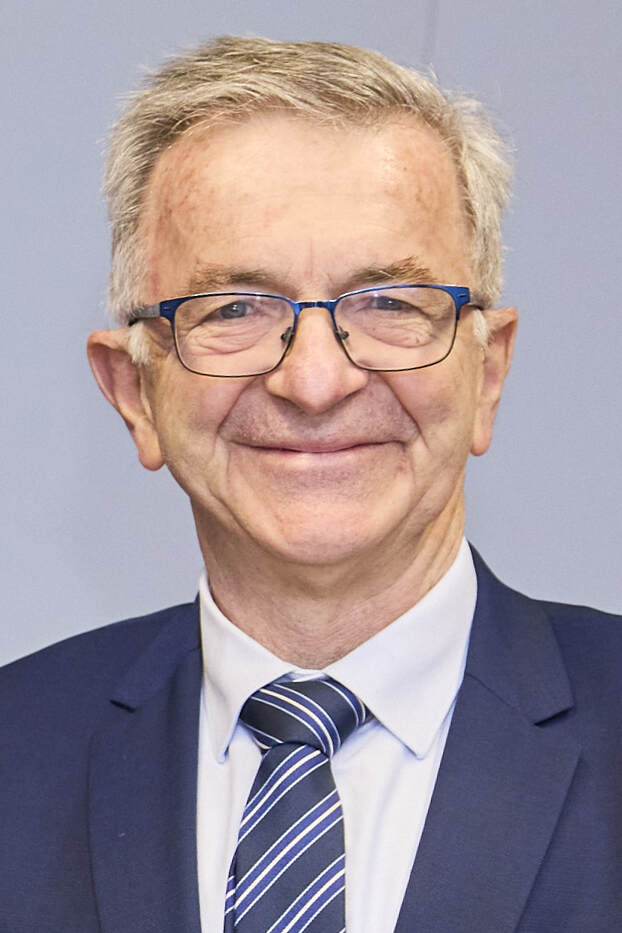
- Bonneau in 2025

President of the Regional Council of Centre-Val de Loire
- Incumbent
- Assumed office 7 September 2007
- Preceded by: Michel Sapin

Personal details
- Born: 12 October 1953 (age 73) Amilly, France
- Party: Socialist Party
- Education: University of Orléans

François Bonneau (French pronunciation: [fʁɑ̃swa bɔno]; born 12 October 1953) is a French educationalist, politician, and incumbent President of the Regional Council of Centre-Val de Loire. He is a member of the Socialist Party.

He has served as

- a representative member of the Montargis municipal council (1983–2008)
- a representative member of the Centre-Val de Loire regional council (since 1998)
- vice-president of the regional council (2004–2007),
- president of the council since 2007 (taking over from Michel Sapin following the resignation of the latter, then being elected for a full term in that role in his own right in March 2010).

In the Socialist Party's 2011 primaries, Bonneau endorsed Martine Aubry as the party's candidate for the 2012 presidential election.

In January 2025, François Bonneau wrote a report on the state of relations between Africa and France. In this report entitled "Seeing Africa in all its States". They also made 20 proposals for the future and invited the French government in particular to demonstrate "strategic patience" in the Sahel.
