= Jean-Jacques Mirassou =

French politician (born 1952)

Jean-Jacques Mirassou (born 1 November 1952 in Toulouse) is a former member of the Senate of France, representing the Haute-Garonne department from 2008 to 2014. He is a member of the Socialist Party.

== Bibliography ==
- Page on the Senate website (in French)
