= Yves Chastan =

French politician (born 1948)

Yves Chastan (born 20 April 1948 in Dieulefit, Drôme) was a member of the Senate of France from 2008 to 2014. He represented the Ardèche department as a member of the Socialist Party.
