= Bertrand Auban =

French politician (born 1947)

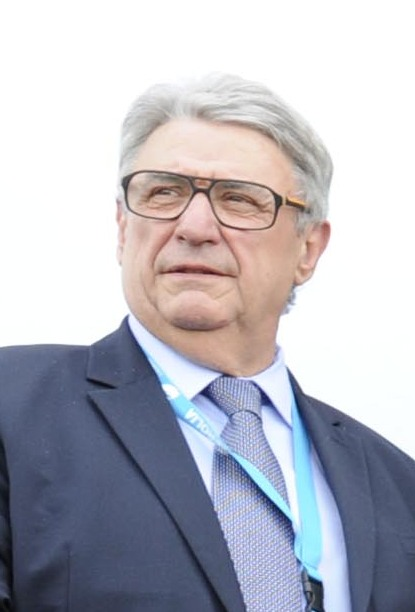
Bertrand Auban

Bertrand Auban (born 18 January 1947) is a former member of the Senate of France, representing the Haute-Garonne department from 1998 to 2014. He is a member of the Socialist Party.

== Bibliography ==
- Page on the Senate website (in French)
