= Gilbert Mathon =

French politician

Gilbert Mathon (born 7 May 1941 in Vitry-en-Artois) is a member of the National Assembly of France. He represents the Somme department, and is a member of the Socialiste, radical, citoyen et divers gauche.
