= Alain Gest =

French politician

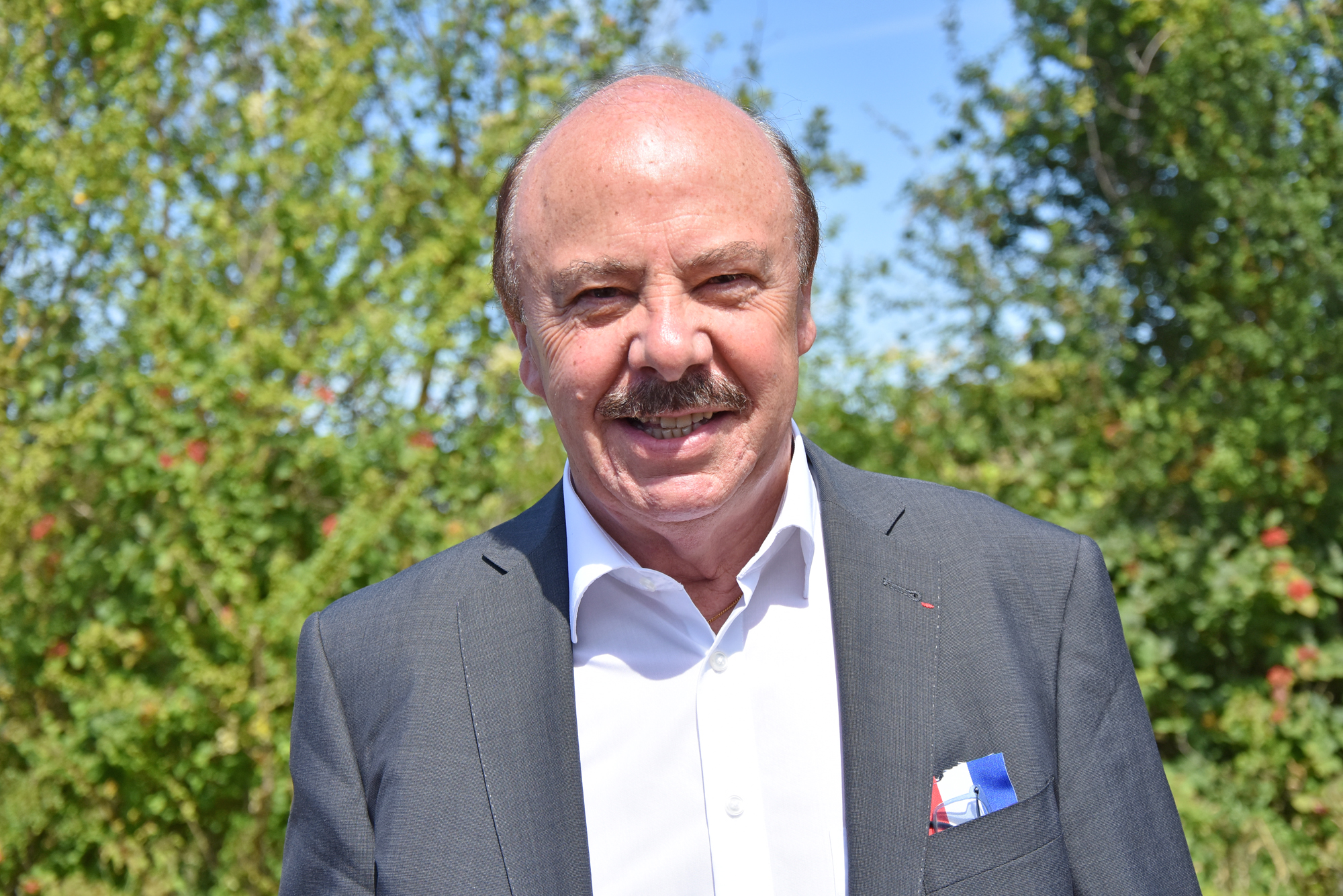
Alain Gest in July 2019

Alain Gest (born 27 December 1950 in Amiens, Somme) is a French politician. He was elected on 16 June 2002 to the 12th French National Assembly, representing the sixth district of Somme. He was reelected on 17 June 2007 to the 13th French National Assembly. He is a member of the Union for a Popular Movement party.
