= Jean-Claude Leclabart =

French politician

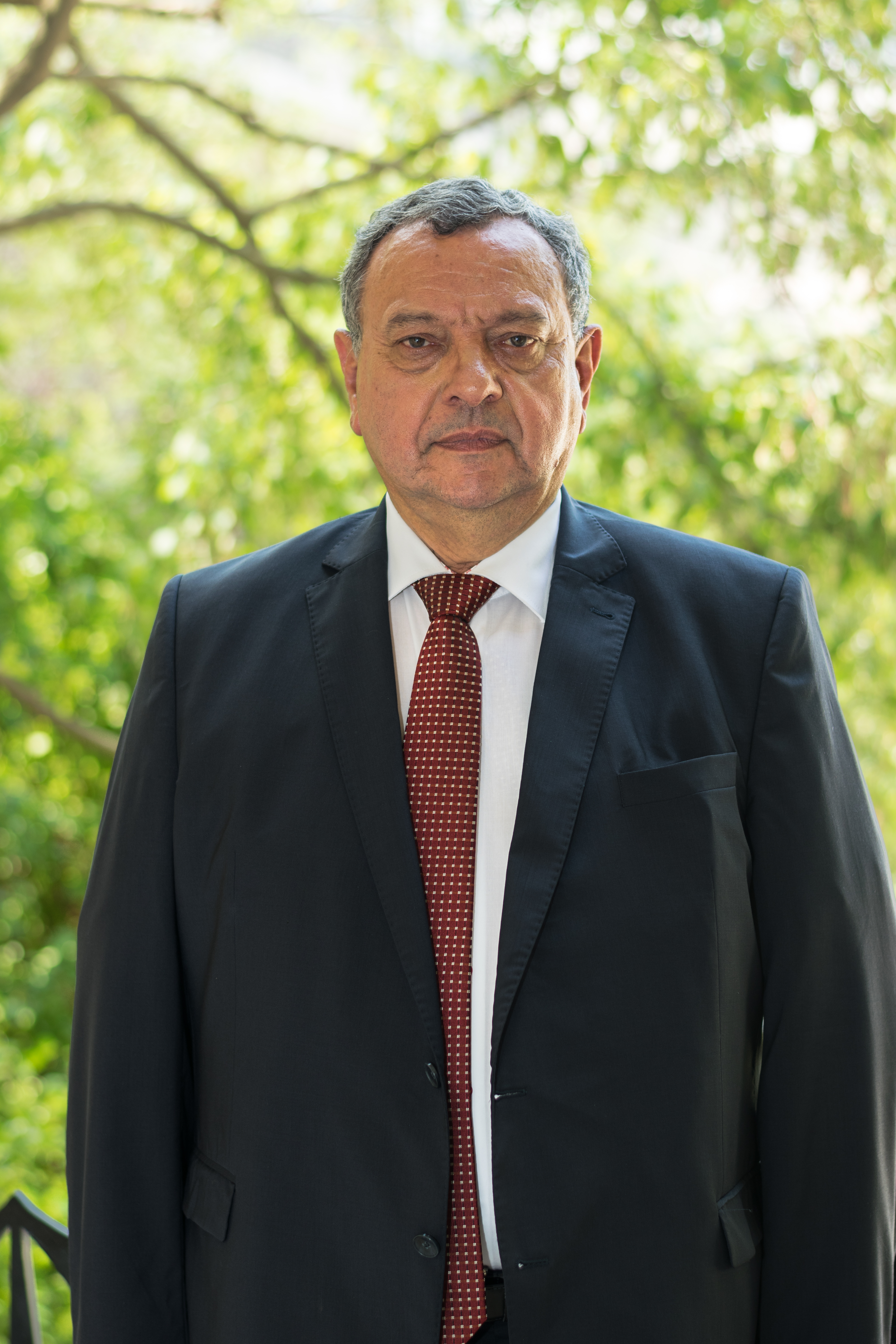
Jean-Claude Leclabart (2017).

Jean-Claude Leclabart is a French politician representing La République En Marche! He was elected to the French National Assembly on 18 June 2017, representing the department of Somme.

== See also ==
- 2017 French legislative election
