= Regional Council of Centre-Val de Loire =

Regional council

Regional Council of Centre-Val de Loire Conseil régional du Centre-Val de Loire

Type
- Type: Regional council
- Chambers: 1

Leadership
- President: François Bonneau, (PS) since 7 September 2007

Structure
- Seats: 77
- Political groups: Majority (42): Socialist Party (24) (Note: PS (19); PR (2); Miscellaneous Left (2); PRG (1)); The Ecologists – La France Insoumise (12) (Note: LÉ (5); Miscellaneous Environmentalists (4); LFI (2); G.s (1)); French Communist Party (6); Opposition (35): The Republicans (13) (Note: LR (11); UDI (2)); National Rally (13) (Note: RN (10); LAF (3)); Ensemble Citoyens (9) (Note: MoDem (4); Ind (3); RE (1); Miscellaneous Right (1))

Elections
- Last election: 20 and 27 June 2021
- Next election: 2028

The Regional Council of Centre-Val de Loire (French: conseil régional du Centre-Val de Loire) is a deliberative assembly composed of 77 councillors, elected to six-year terms. As a whole, the body represents the region of Centre-Val de Loire, France. The current president of the council is François Bonneau of the Socialist Party (PS). A position he has held since 7 September 2007 and the resignation of fellow party member Michel Sapin. The regional council meets at the hôtel de région in Orléans, Loiret department. The building is located at 9, rue Saint-Pierre Lentin.

== Composition ==
=== Allocation of seats ===
Council seats are allocated by department, as follows:

- 19 councillors for Loiret
- 18 councillors for Indre-et-Loire
- 12 councillors for Eure-et-Loir
- 10 councillors for Cher
- 10 councillors for Loir-et-Cher
- 8 councillors for Indre

=== Political groups ===
The current council is composed of six political groups:

- The Socialists, radicals, citizens (PS - PRG) (24)
- The Union of the right, the centre and the independents (LR - UDI) (13)
- The National Rally and allies (RN) (13)
- Ecology and solidarity (EÉLV - FI) (12)
- Center, Democrat, Republican and Citizen (MoDem - REM) (9)
- Communist and republican (PCF) (6)

== Executive ==
=== Presidents ===
The current council president is François Bonneau of the Socialist Party (PS), first elected to the position in 2007.

List of previous council presidents
| President | Party | Term start | Term end | Notes |
Region Centre (1974—2015)
| Raymond Boisdé | FNRI | 1974 | 1976 | |
| Pierre Sudreau | MR | 1976 | 1979 | Changed political affiliation while in office. |
| Pierre Sudreau | UDF | 1976 | 1979 | Changed political affiliation while in office. |
| Jean Delaneau | UDF-PR | 1979 | 1983 | |
| Daniel Bernardet | UDF | 1983 | 17 March 1985 | |
| Maurice Dousset | UDF-PR | 17 March 1985 | 15 March 1998 | |
| Bernard Harang | UDF-DL | 15 March 1998 | | Resigned after being elected with support of the Front National |
| Lydie Gerbaud | RPR | 15 March 1998 | | Acting as doyenne d'âge |
| Michel Sapin | PS | 15 March 1998 | 27 March 2000 | Resigned upon entry into government. |
| Jean Germain | PS | 27 March 2000 | | Acting as 1st Vice-President. |
| Alain Rafesthain | PS | 27 March 2000 | 2 April 2004 | |
| Michel Sapin | PS | 2 April 2004 | 7 September 2007 | Resigned upon being elected to the National Assembly. |
| Jean Germain | PS | 7 September 2007 | | Acting as 1st Vice-President. |
| François Bonneau | PS | 7 September 2007 | 17 January 2015 | |
Region Centre-Val de Loire (2015—)
| François Bonneau | PS | 17 January 2015 | Present | |

=== Vice-presidents ===
Currently, the regional council executive is also composed of 13 vice presidents.

| Title | Name | Party | Delegate for | Other mandates | Department |
|---|---|---|---|---|---|
| 1st vice president | Marc Gricourt | PS | Finance, European funds, and personnel | Mayor of Blois | Loir-et-Cher |
| 2nd vice president | Cathy Munsch-Masset | PS | Education and apprentenship | | Indre-et-Loire |
| 3rd vice president | Benoît Faucheux | EÉLV | Environment and energy transition | | Indre-et-Loire |
| 4th vice president | Isabelle Gaudron | PS | Professional development, insertion, and orientation | 1st deputy mayor of Amboise | Indre-et-Loire |
| 5th vice president | Harold Huwart | PRG | Economic development, social and solidarity economic and agriculture | Municipal councillor of Nogent-le-Rotrou | Eure-et-Loir |
| 6th vice president | Anne Leclercq | PS | Health & social training and health | 1st deputy mayor of Ouzouer-sur-Trézée | Loiret |
| 7th vice president | Dominique Roullet | PS | Regional planning and digital governance | 1st deputy mayor of Issoudun | Indre |
| 8th vice president | Agnès Sinsoulier | PS | Culture | | Cher |
| 9th vice president | Philippe Fournié | PS | Transportation and intermodality | Deputy mayor of Vierzon | Cher |
| 10th vice president | Anne Besnier | PS | Higher education and research | Vice president of the Communauté de communes des Loges, municipal councillor of Fay-aux-Loges, deputy senator for Jean-Pierre Sueur | Loiret |
| 11th vice president | Charles Fournier | EÉLV | Democracy, citizen initiatives, rural development, cooperation, and equality | | Loir-et-Cher |
| 12th vice president | Christelle de Crémiers | EÉLV | Tourism, terroirs, and food | Opposition municipal councillor of Gien | Loiret |
| 13th vice president | Mohamed Moulay | PS | Sports | Municipal councillor of Joué-lès-Tours | Indre-et-Loire |
