= Results of the 2022 French legislative election by constituency =

Results of a legislative election held in France

2022 French legislative election by constituency
12 June 2022 (1st round); 19 June 2022 (2nd round)

All 577 seats in the National Assembly 289 seats needed for a majority
- Turnout: 47.5% (1st round)
- The results of the first round shows which group led in each seat.
Prime Minister before election
Élisabeth Borne
LREM
Elected Prime Minister
Élisabeth Borne
LREM

Following the 2022 French presidential election in April, in which Emmanuel Macron secured a second term and beat Marine Le Pen, the 2022 French legislative election was held to elect the 577 seats of the National Assembly. The first round took place on 12 June, and the second round took place on 19 June.

== By constituency ==
The incumbent deputy at dissolution, whether elected in 2017 or replaced through a later by-election, is listed, and the party to whom they belong reflects the 2022 blocs. Individual candidates who exceeded 10% of the vote in the first round but are not in one of the four largest alliances are mentioned in the "Other" column.

One candidate (in 1st Lot-et-Garonne) who qualified for the 2nd round as a third candidate withdrew.

=== Metropolitan France ===
Constituency		Incumbent	Party	Elected deputy	Party	Votes	%	First round results									
Constituency		Incumbent	Party	Elected deputy	Party	Votes	%	Ensemble		NUPES		RN		UDC		Other	
								Votes	%	Votes	%	Votes	%	Votes	%	Other Candidate 1	Other Candidate 2
Ain	1st	Xavier Breton	UDC	Xavier Breton	UDC	24,407	63.22%	8,071	19.30%	9,982	23.87%	8,971	21.46%	10,599	25.35%		
Ain	2nd	Charles de la Verpillière*	UDC	Romain Daubié	Ensemble	24,960	58.34%	12,916	26.42%	12,428	25.42%	11,354	23.23%	71,92	14.71%		
Ain	3rd	Olga Givernet	Ensemble	Olga Givernet	Ensemble	18,398	58.72%	10,704	29.96%	7,990	22.36%	4,993	13.97%	6,425	17.98%		
Ain	4th	Stéphane Trompille	Ensemble	Jérôme Buisson	RN	22,601	62.27%	7,317	16.34%	7,786	17.38%	11,116	24.82%	7,198	16.07%		
Ain	5th	Damien Abad	Ensemble	Damien Abad	Ensemble	17,687	57.86%	12,034	33.38%	8,485	23.54%	7,110	19.72%	3,580	9.93%		
Aisne	1st	Aude Bono-Vandorme	Ensemble	Nicolas Dragon	RN	17,058	54.56%	7,938	23.39%	6,463	19.05%	11,245	33.14%	3,853	11.35%		
Aisne	2nd	Julien Dive	UDC	Julien Dive	UDC	17,463	58.17%	3,755	11.52%	5,757	17.66%	9,331	28.63%	11,704	35.91%		
Aisne	3rd	Jean-Louis Bricout	NUPES	Jean-Louis Bricout	NUPES	15,586	54.84%	–	–	13,518	45.88%	9,518	32.31%	3,584	12.17%		
Aisne	4th	Marc Delatte	Ensemble	José Beaurain	RN	17,587	57.15%	7,632	22.77%	7,461	22.26%	11,971	35.72%	4,300	12.83%		
Aisne	5th	Jacques Krabal*	Ensemble	Jocelyn Dessigny	RN	20,589	62.41%	6,213	16.12%	7,264	18.85%	13,572	35.22%	1,873	4.86%	Sébastien Eugène (PRV dissident) with 6,093 votes (15.81%)	
Allier	1st	Jean-Paul Dufrègne*	NUPES	Yannick Monnet	NUPES	21,832	55.51%	8,634	19.44%	13,578	30.57%	8,615	19.40%	5,476	12.33%		
Allier	2nd	Laurence Vanceunebrock-Mialon	Ensemble	Jorys Bovet	RN	16,116	50.22%	6,796	17.02%	8,719	21.84%	7,642	19.14%	4,468	11.19%	Bernard Pozzoli (miscellaneous left) with 4,186 votes (10.49%)	
Allier	3rd	Bénédicte Peyrol	Ensemble	Nicolas Ray	UDC	19,296	60.98%	9,219	23.27%	7,737	19.53%	8,047	20.31%	9,594	24.22%		
Alpes-de-Haute-Provence	1st	Delphine Bagarry	NUPES	Christian Girard	RN	14,791	51.20%	7,008	22.43%	8,744	27.99%	8,910	28.52%	–	–		
Alpes-de-Haute-Provence	2nd	Christophe Castaner	Ensemble	Léo Walter	NUPES	16,063	51.49%	10,232	30.16%	9,940	29.30%	7,905	23.30%	1,288	3.80%		
Hautes-Alpes	1st	Pascale Boyer	Ensemble	Pascale Boyer	Ensemble	13,767	50.36%	7,543	24.90%	8,562	28.27%	6,552	21.63%	3,803	12.56%		
Hautes-Alpes	2nd	Claire Bouchet	Ensemble	Joel Giraud	Ensemble	15,058	56.59%	10,889	38.04%	8,365	29.22%	4,996	17.45%	1,549	5.41%		
Alpes-Maritimes	1st	Éric Ciotti	UDC	Éric Ciotti	UDC	17,737	56.33%	9,215	25.92%	7,260	20.42%	4,729	13.30%	11,271	31.70%		
Alpes-Maritimes	2nd	Loïc Dombreval	Ensemble	Lionel Tivoli	RN	18,557	51.65%	9,547	23.67%	7,591	18.82%	9,639	23.90%	5,686	14.10%		
Alpes-Maritimes	3rd	Cédric Roussel*	Ensemble	Philippe Pradal	Ensemble	19,043	57.44%	10,113	26.04%	8,524	21.95%	6,668	17.17%	4,973	12.81%	Reconquête with 4,217 votes (10.86%)	
Alpes-Maritimes	4th	Alexandra Valetta-Ardisson	Ensemble	Alexandra Masson	RN	19,487	56.20%	8,464	22.37%	5,803	15.33%	10,925	28.87%	5,494	14.52%	Reconquête with 4,036 votes (10.66%)	
Alpes-Maritimes	5th	Marine Brenier	Ensemble	Christelle d’Intorni	UDC	19,814	57.54%	10,400	26.14%	7,052	17.73%	7,560	19.00%	8,943	22.48%		
Alpes-Maritimes	6th	Laurence Trastour-Isnart	UDC	Bryan Masson	RN	17,564	51.35%	8,489	22.99%	4,910	13.30%	9,349	25.32%	7,450	20.18%		
Alpes-Maritimes	7th	Éric Pauget	UDC	Éric Pauget	UDC	22,496	58.84 %	10,814	23.78%	7,086	15.58%	7,675	16.88%	12,031	26.46%		
Alpes-Maritimes	8th	Bernard Brochand	UDC	Alexandra Martin	UDC	21,547	69.27%	7,080	19.47%	4,506	12.39%	6,766	18.61%	12,144	33.40%		
Alpes-Maritimes	9th	Michèle Tabarot	UDC	Michèle Tabarot	UDC	19,998	63.20%	5,538	15.11%	5,395	14.72%	7,518	20.51%	10,605	28.94%		
Ardèche	1st	Hervé Saulignac	NUPES	Hervé Saulignac	NUPES	21,550	60.05%	6,757	17.12%	15,107	38.28%	9,202	23.32%	4,081	10.34%		
Ardèche	2nd	Michèle Victory*	NUPES	Olivier Dussopt	Ensemble	25,684	58.86%	15,014	30.04%	11,785	23.58%	9,512	19.03%	8,941	17.89%		
Ardèche	3rd	Fabrice Brun	UDC	Fabrice Brun	UDC	24,896	57.11%	5,913	13.16%	11,989	26.68%	6,964	15.50%	11,217	24.96%	Laurent Ughetto (PS dissident) with 5,934 votes (13.21%)	
Ardennes	1st	Bérengère Poletti	UDC	Lionel Vuibert	Ensemble	14,861	50.34%	6,602	20.47%	5,960	18.48%	8,835	27.40%	6,338	19.65%		
Ardennes	2nd	Pierre Cordier	UDC	Pierre Cordier	UDC	15,977	69.39%	3,309	12.69%	4,970	19.06%	5,485	21.04%	10,685	40.98%		
Ardennes	3rd	Jean-Luc Warsmann	UDC	Jean-Luc Warsmann	UDC	15,575	67.75%	2,235	8.64%	3,822	14.78%	5,758	22.27%	12,332	47.69%		
Ariège	1st	Bénédicte Taurine	NUPES	Bénédicte Taurine	NUPES	14,746	55.31%	6,237	19.96%	10,347	33.12%	6,229	19.94%	–	–	Martine Froger (PS dissident) with 5,646 votes (18.07%)	
Ariège	2nd	Michel Larive	NUPES	Laurent Panifous	DVG	16,225	56.71%	4,237	13.06%	9,424	29.05%	6,686	20.61%	–	–	Laurent Panifous (PS dissident) with 7,068 votes (21.79%)	
Aube	1st	Grégory Besson-Moreau	Ensemble	Jordan Guitton	RN	16,093	53.89%	7,615	24.24%	4,558	14.51%	11,406	36.31%	5,093	16.21%		
Aube	2nd	Valérie Bazin-Malgras	UDC	Valérie Bazin-Malgras	UDC	19,730	59.51%	6,130	16.80%	6,164	16.89%	9,989	27.38%	10,425	28.57%		
Aube	3rd	Gérard Menuel*	UDC	Angélique Ranc	RN	13,913	51.65%	6,546	21.57%	6,430	21.19%	8,958	29.52%	4,507	14.85%		
Aude	1st	Danièle Hérin	Ensemble	Christophe Barthès	RN	23,914	53.56%	10,636	21.98%	13,620	28.15%	15,871	32.80%	2,501	5.17%		
Aude	2nd	Alain Péréa	Ensemble	Frédéric Falcon	RN	20,719	52.53%	9,666	21.99%	9,204	20.94%	12,365	28.13%	3,706	8.43%		
Aude	3rd	Mireille Robert	Ensemble	Julien Rancoule	RN	22,725	53.32%	10,624	21.84%	12,547	25.80%	13,838	28.45%	1,573	3.23%		
Aveyron	1st	Stéphane Mazars	Ensemble	Stéphane Mazars	Ensemble	23,137	63.83%	17,580	42.46%	8,922	21.55%	5,391	13.02%	5,436	13.13%		
Aveyron	2nd	Anne Blanc	Ensemble	Laurent Alexandre	NUPES	17,354	50.99%	8,568	22.60%	10,534	27.78%	4,865	12.83%	5,907	15.58%		
Aveyron	3rd	Sébastien David*	UDC	Jean-François Rousset	Ensemble	18,834	53.71%	9,741	25.14%	10,493	27.09%	6,017	15.53%	6,818	17.60%		
Bouches-du-Rhône	1st	Julien Ravier*	UDC	Sabrina Agresti-Roubache	Ensemble	15,459	50.79%	8,487	25.42%	8,092	24.23%	9,103	27.26%	2,230	6.68%		
Bouches-du-Rhône	2nd	Claire Pitollat	Ensemble	Claire Pitollat	Ensemble	22,005	61.64%	12,026	29.85%	10,101	25.07%	6,561	16.29%	5,262	13.06%		
Bouches-du-Rhône	3rd	Alexandra Louis	Ensemble	Gisèle Lelouis	RN	14,300	54.96%	6,056	21.87%	7,678	27.73%	7,016	25.34%	995	3.59%		
Bouches-du-Rhône	4th	Jean-Luc Mélenchon	NUPES	Manuel Bompard	NUPES	17,118	73.92%	3,683	14.88%	13,871	56.04%	2,396	9.68%	1,176	4.75%		
Bouches-du-Rhône	5th	Cathy Racon-Bouzon	Ensemble	Hendrik Davi	NUPES	17,295	56.64%	7,841	23.41%	13,496	40.30%	5,131	15.32%	1,346	4.02%		
Bouches-du-Rhône	6th	Guy Teissier*	UDC	Lionel Royer-Perreaut	Ensemble	16,646	57.89%	9,725	29.75%	7,179	21.96%	7,810	23.89%	2,744	8.39%		
Bouches-du-Rhône	7th	Saïd Ahamada	Ensemble	Sébastien Delogu	NUPES	11,960	64.68%	2,879	15.80%	6,904	37.88%	4,226	23.19%	294	1.61%		
Bouches-du-Rhône	8th	Jean-Marc Zulesi	Ensemble	Jean-Marc Zulesi	Ensemble	22,823	53.17%	13,166	27.78%	9,197	19.41%	12,004	25.33%	7,074	14.93%		
Bouches-du-Rhône	9th	Bernard Deflesselles*	UDC	Joëlle Mélin	RN	23,757	58.64%	9,306	20.52%	9,776	21.56%	11,256	24.82%	7,061	15.57%		
Bouches-du-Rhône	10th	François-Michel Lambert*	LEF	José Gonzalez	RN	27,463	59.62%	10,739	20.64%	11,271	21.67%	15,165	29.15%	7,016	13.49%		
Bouches-du-Rhône	11th	Mohamed Laqhila	Ensemble	Mohamed Laqhila	Ensemble	20,753	55.19%	10,598	25.43%	9,362	22.47%	9,679	23.23%	4,399	10.56%		
Bouches-du-Rhône	12th	Éric Diard	UDC	Franck Allisio	RN	19,175	51.37%	–	–	7,339	19.12%	13,921	36.28%	11,419	29.78%		
Bouches-du-Rhône	13th	Pierre Dharréville	NUPES	Pierre Dharréville	NUPES	20,105	52.01%	6,180	15.42%	14,361	35.83%	12,430	31.01%	1,205	3.01%		
Bouches-du-Rhône	14th	Anne-Laurence Petel	Ensemble	Anne-Laurence Petel	Ensemble	24,245	56.85%	14,250	29.99%	12,256	25.80%	7,961	16.76%	5,741	12.08%		
Bouches-du-Rhône	15th	Bernard Reynès	UDC	Romain Baubry	RN	25,640	53.85%	11,458	22.16%	9,715	18.78%	15,269	29.52%	7,456	14.42%		
Bouches-du-Rhône	16th	Monica Michel*	Ensemble	Emmanuel Tache de la Pagerie	RN	20,820	54.94%	9,970	24.97%	10,673	26.73%	12,324	30.86%	–	–		
Calvados	1st	Fabrice Le Vigoureux	Ensemble	Fabrice Le Vigoureux	Ensemble	18,496	50.27%	11,507	30.25%	13,622	35.81%	4,048	10.64%	5,275	13.87%		
Calvados	2nd	Laurence Dumont*	NUPES	Arthur Delaporte	NUPES	18,963	59.86%	8,138	24.35%	14,040	42.01%	5,091	15.23%	2,449	7.33%		
Calvados	3rd	Nathalie Porte	UDC	Jérémie Patrier-Leitus	Ensemble	18,546	53.50%	8,531	22.42%	8,160	21.44%	9,229	24.25%	8,311	21.84%		
Calvados	4th	Christophe Blanchet	Ensemble	Christophe Blanchet	Ensemble	28,922	61.08%	19,101	36.44%	11,865	22.64%	9,849	18.79%	6,583	12.56%		
Calvados	5th	Bertrand Bouyx	Ensemble	Bertrand Bouyx	Ensemble	24,237	55.68%	13,514	27.85%	11,255	23.19%	9,240	19.04%	8,733	17.99%		
Calvados	6th	Alain Tourret*	Ensemble	Élisabeth Borne	Ensemble	23,437	52.46%	16,491	34.32%	11,785	24.53%	10,447	21.74%	–	–		
Cantal	1st	Vincent Descœur	UDC	Vincent Descœur	UDC	18,165	69.02%	7,338	22.25%	6,104	18.51%	3,695	11.21%	13,299	40.33%		
Cantal	2nd	Jean-Yves Bony	UDC	Jean-Yves Bony	UDC	15,443	70.65%	4,848	17.46%	4,534	16.33%	3,861	13.90%	10,472	37.71%	Louis Toty (SE, miscellaneous right) with 2,967 votes (10.68%)	
Charente	1st	Thomas Mesnier	Ensemble	Thomas Mesnier	Ensemble	18,854	50.03%	12,336	30.45%	11,152	27.53%	6,503	16.05%	2,122	5.24%	Jean-François Dauré (PS dissident) with 5,934 votes (12.50%)	
Charente	2nd	Sandra Marsaud	Ensemble	Sandra Marsaud	Ensemble	19,965	55.16 %	11,568	28.77%	8,244	20.50%	9,245	22.99%	4,920	12.24%		
Charente	3rd	Jérôme Lambert	MDC	Caroline Colombier	RN	19,980	50.24%	9,286	20.43%	8,851	19.48%	10,475	23.05%	1,914	4.21%	Jérôme Lambert (MDC) with 8,142 votes (17.92%)	
Charente-Maritime	1st	Olivier Falorni	PRG	Olivier Falorni	PRG	34,576	66.11%	12,656	22.99%	12,875	23.39%	5,253	9.54%	–	–	Olivier Falorni (PRG) with 15,976 votes (29.02%)	
Charente-Maritime	2nd	Frédérique Tuffnell*	Ensemble	Anne-Laure Babault	Ensemble	25,863	51.76%	15,246	28.09%	14,928	27.50%	11,049	20.36%	6,680	12.31%		
Charente-Maritime	3rd	Jean-Philippe Ardouin	Ensemble	Jean-Philippe Ardouin	Ensemble	18,295	51.18%	10,111	24.53%	8,685	21.07%	9,192	22.30%	2,826	6.86%		
Charente-Maritime	4th	Raphaël Gérard	Ensemble	Raphaël Gérard	Ensemble	21,447	50.90%	12,743	27.59%	9,114	19.73%	11,900	25.77%	6,828	14.78%		
Charente-Maritime	5th	Didier Quentin	UDC	Christophe Plassard	Ensemble	28,233	51.74%	14,245	23.83%	11,886	19.88%	15,404	25.76%	10,519	17.59%		
Cher	1st	François Cormier-Bouligeon	Ensemble	François Cormier-Bouligeon	Ensemble	17,117	57.14%	11,113	32.14%	8,370	24.20%	7,591	21.95%	4,669	13.50%		
Cher	2nd	Nadia Essayan	Ensemble	Nicolas Sansu	NUPES	14,433	54.37%	7,193	22.60%	10,300	32.36%	7,317	22.99%	3,912	12.29%		
Cher	3rd	Loïc Kervran	Ensemble	Loïc Kervran	Ensemble	20,435	54.93%	13,299	32.60%	8,901	21.82%	11,226	27.52%	3,171	7.77%		
Corrèze	1st	Christophe Jerretie	Ensemble	Francis Dubois	UDC	25,825	53.80%	10,095	19.32%	13,271	25.40%	7,905	15.13%	10,772	20.62%		
Corrèze	2nd	Frédérique Meunier	UDC	Frédérique Meunier	UDC	25,881	58.40%	9,947	20.56%	10,239	21.16%	8,490	17.55%	11,262	23.28%		
Corse-du-Sud	1st	Jean-Jacques Ferrara*	UDC	Laurent Marcangeli	Ensemble	12,013	51.76%	7,972	33.70%	1,281	5.41%	3,003	12.69%	–	–	Romain Colonna (FaC) with 4,135 votes (17.48%)	Jean-Paul Carrolaggi (PNC) with 3,002 votes (12.69%)
Corse-du-Sud	2nd	Paul-André Colombani	PNC	Paul-André Colombani	PNC	14,746	57.61%	7,084	27.62%	1,046	4.08%	3,787	14.77%	–	–	Paul-André Colombani (PNC) with 9,549 votes (37.24%)	
Haute-Corse	1st	Michel Castellani	FaC	Michel Castellani	FaC	13,724	63.01%	2,944	11.96%	1,533	6.23%	2,996	12.17%	–	–	Michel Castellani (FaC) with 8,316 votes (33.77%)	Julien Morganti (SE, miscellaneous centre) with 3,352 votes (13.61%)
Haute-Corse	2nd	Jean-Félix Acquaviva	FaC	Jean-Félix Acquaviva	FaC	16,777	50.23%	–	–	1,879	5.89%	3,658	11.47%	9,267	29.06%	Jean-Félix Acquaviva (FaC) with 10,670 votes (33.46%)	Lionel Mortini (Corsica Libera) with 5,736 votes (17.99%)
Côte-d'Or	1st	Didier Martin	Ensemble	Didier Martin	Ensemble	19,473	58.03%	11,622	31.16%	9,558	25.63%	4,558	12.22%	5,521	14.80%		
Côte-d'Or	2nd	Rémi Delatte*	UDC	Benoît Bordat	Ensemble	15,714	51.70%	9,347	27.04%	10,116	29.27%	7,151	20.69%	3,952	11.43%		
Côte-d'Or	3rd	Fadila Khattabi	Ensemble	Fadila Khattabi	Ensemble	14,900	50.11%	8,701	25.65%	8,610	25.38%	7,704	22.71%	2,853	8.41%		
Côte-d'Or	4th	Yolaine de Courson	Ensemble	Hubert Brigand	UDC	19,332	60.68%	5,869	16.05%	6,448	17.63%	7,733	21.14%	6,660	18.21%		
Côte-d'Or	5th	Didier Paris	Ensemble	Didier Paris	Ensemble	20,031	54.24%	11,326	26.83%	8,299	19.66%	10,005	23.70%	5,620	13.31%		
Côtes-d'Armor	1st	Bruno Joncour	Ensemble	Mickaël Cosson	Ensemble	24,043	52.39%	11,817	24.81%	13,092	27.49%	5,904	12.40%	–	–		
Côtes-d'Armor	2nd	Hervé Berville	Ensemble	Hervé Berville	Ensemble	29,411	55.83%	20,946	36.91%	14,659	25.83%	9,340	16.46%	–	–		
Côtes-d'Armor	3rd	Marc Le Fur	UDC	Marc Le Fur	UDC	30,012	64.87%	9,049	18.67%	10,980	22.66%	5,693	11.75%	20,203	41.69%		
Côtes-d'Armor	4th	Yannick Kerlogot	Ensemble	Murielle Lepvraud	NUPES	21,700	53.42%	11,296	25.93%	11,852	27.21%	7,027	16.13%	2,964	6.80%		
Côtes-d'Armor	5th	Éric Bothorel	Ensemble	Éric Bothorel	Ensemble	29,496	52.49%	18,543	30.93%	15,851	26.44%	7,999	13.34%	4,038	6.74%		
Creuse	1st	Jean-Baptiste Moreau	Ensemble	Catherine Couturier	NUPES	21,752	51.44%	12,368	25.99%	12,545	26.59%	8,118	17.06%	–	–	Jean Auclair (miscellaneous right) with 8,383 votes (17.62%)	
Dordogne	1st	Philippe Chassaing	Ensemble	Pascale Martin	NUPES	18,366	51.85%	8,692	21.48%	9,845	24.33%	8,209	20.29%	4,915	12.15%	Floran Vadillo (PS dissident) with 4,360 votes (10.78%)	
Dordogne	2nd	Michel Delpon	Ensemble	Serge Muller	RN	18,891	50.44%	9,591	22.05%	9,214	21.19%	10,338	23.77%	2,961	6.81%	Christophe Cathus (PS dissident) with 6,384 votes (14.68%)	
Dordogne	3rd	Jean-Pierre Cubertafon	Ensemble	Jean-Pierre Cubertafon	Ensemble	14,284	36.52%	8,796	23.31%	8,937	23.68%	8,477†	22.46%	2,160	5.72%		
Dordogne	4th	Jacqueline Dubois	Ensemble	Sébastien Peytavie	NUPES	24,233	55.52%	–	–	12,787	26.08%	8,624	17.59%	6,102	12.45%	Jacqueline Dubois (LREM dissident) with 9,958 votes (20.31%)	Christian Teillac (PS dissident) with 6,671 votes (13.61%)
Doubs	1st	Fannette Charvier*	Ensemble	Laurent Croizier	Ensemble	17,465	51.88%	9,901	26.75%	11,022	29.78%	6,597	17.82%	4,070	11.00%		
Doubs	2nd	Éric Alauzet	Ensemble	Éric Alauzet	Ensemble	19,255	52.26%	12,647	31.36%	13,112	32.51%	7,055	17.49%	4,354	10.80%		
Doubs	3rd	Denis Sommer*	Ensemble	Nicolas Pacquot	Ensemble	13,754	50.83%	6,919	22.81%	6,202	20.45%	7,819	25.78%	2,506	8.26%	Valère Nedey (LR dissident) with 4,223 votes (13.92%)	
Doubs	4th	Frédéric Barbier	Ensemble	Géraldine Grangier	RN	13,357	50.99%	7,878	27.37%	5,791	20.12%	8,738	30.36%	3,098	10.76%		
Doubs	5th	Annie Genevard	UDC	Annie Genevard	UDC	22,681	72.06%	7,825	19.49%	7,516	18.72%	5,869	14.61%	16,893	42.07%		
Drôme	1st	Mireille Clapot	Ensemble	Mireille Clapot	Ensemble	17,769	54.42%	7,353	20.45%	10,058	27.98%	5,638	15.68%	6,996	19.46%		
Drôme	2nd	Alice Thourot	Ensemble	Lisette Pollet	RN	21,566	57.12%	8,731	20.07%	10,398	23.91%	11,585	26.64%	5,561	12.79%		
Drôme	3rd	Célia de Lavergne	Ensemble	Marie Pochon	NUPES	29,636	52.22%	14,782	23.50%	22,321	35.49%	10,001	15.90%	9,986	15.88%		
Drôme	4th	Emmanuelle Anthoine	UDC	Emmanuelle Anthoine	UDC	27,077	57.90%	7,791	15.99%	14,858	30.50%	9,801	20.12%	12,579	25.82%		
Eure	1st	Séverine Gipson	Ensemble	Christine Loir	RN	18,629	50.62%	10,583	26.74%	7,609	19.22%	11,830	29.89%	3,219	8.13%		
Eure	2nd	Fabien Gouttefarde	Ensemble	Katiana Levavasseur	RN	17,990	51.10%	9,994	25.71%	8,171	21.02%	11,508	29.61%	3,945	10.15%		
Eure	3rd	Marie Tamarelle-Verhaeghe	Ensemble	Kévin Mauvieux	RN	21,161	54.05%	9,849	23.18%	8,124	19.12%	13,474	31.72%	6,937	16.33%		
Eure	4th	Bruno Questel	Ensemble	Philippe Brun	NUPES	19,825	50.44%	10,727	24.67%	12,078	27.78%	12,598	28.97%	3,104	7.14%		
Eure	5th	Claire O'Petit*	Ensemble	Timothée Houssin	RN	19,654	50.96%	11,912	27.73%	8,959	20.86%	12,555	29.23%	3,497	8.14%		
Eure-et-Loir	1st	Guillaume Kasbarian	Ensemble	Guillaume Kasbarian	Ensemble	22,530	58.10%	13,838	31.32%	10,087	22.83%	8,270	18.72%	3,892	8.81%		
Eure-et-Loir	2nd	Olivier Marleix	UDC	Olivier Marleix	UDC	17,957	62.33%	5,271	16.39%	5,998	18.65%	7,880	24.50%	9,124	28.37%		
Eure-et-Loir	3rd	Luc Lamirault	Ensemble	Luc Lamirault	Ensemble	16,055	53.96%	9,505	28.87%	6,283	19.08%	8,086	24.56%	2,934	8.91%		
Eure-et-Loir	4th	Philippe Vigier	Ensemble	Philippe Vigier	Ensemble	17,671	60.17%	14,050	42.66%	5,079	15.42%	8,072	24.51%	2,468	7.49%		
Finistère	1st	Annaïg Le Meur	Ensemble	Annaïg Le Meur	Ensemble	25,447	53.89%	17,432	35.49%	15,760	32.08%	5,339	10.87%	3,615	7.36%		
Finistère	2nd	Jean-Charles Larsonneur	Ensemble	Jean-Charles Larsonneur	Ensemble	18,127	50.16%	5,159	13.57%	12,135	31.91%	3,815	10.03%	1,356	3.57%	Jean-Charles Larsonneur (LREM dissident) with 5,936 votes (15.61%)	
Finistère	3rd	Didier Le Gac	Ensemble	Didier Le Gac	Ensemble	25,169	57.90%	19,442	41.37%	13,712	29.18%	5,989	12.74%	2,997	6.38%		
Finistère	4th	Sandrine Le Feur	Ensemble	Sandrine Le Feur	Ensemble	22,872	54.40%	15,295	34.78%	13,625	30.98%	5,181	11.78%	5,078	11.55%		
Finistère	5th	Graziella Melchior	Ensemble	Graziella Melchior	Ensemble	25,585	54.58%	15,555	31.26%	14,444	29.03%	6,591	13.25%	8,484	17.05%		
Finistère	6th	Richard Ferrand	Ensemble	Mélanie Thomin	NUPES	23,948	50.85%	16,526	33.56%	15,345	31.16%	7,146	14.51%	5,218	10.60%		
Finistère	7th	Liliane Tanguy	Ensemble	Liliane Tanguy	Ensemble	22,266	52.25%	14,001	31.23%	13,443	29.99%	5,589	12.47%	5,416	12.08%		
Finistère	8th	Erwan Balanant	Ensemble	Erwan Balanant	Ensemble	23,292	52.43%	16,270	34.87%	14,772	31.66%	7,522	16.12%	3,104	6.65%		
Gard	1st	Françoise Dumas	Ensemble	Yoann Gillet	RN	17,564	52.01%	9,200	25.21%	8,731	23.93%	11,547	31.65%	2,125	5.82%		
Gard	2nd	Nicolas Meizonnet	RN	Nicolas Meizonnet	RN	22,595	56.65%	10,050	23.05%	9,502	21.79%	15,434	35.39%	3,802	8.72%		
Gard	3rd	Anthony Cellier	Ensemble	Pascale Bordes	RN	21,619	51.32%	12,274	26.77%	9,474	20.66%	13,796	30.08%	3,087	6.73%		
Gard	4th	Annie Chapelier*	NUPES	Pierre Meurin	RN	22,289	54.49%	9,637	21.58%	11,870	26.58%	13,648	30.56%	1,400	3.13%		
Gard	5th	Catherine Daufès-Roux	Ensemble	Michel Sala	NUPES	23,001	53.00%	10,399	21.16%	16,451	33.48%	11,582	23.57%	3,834	7.80%		
Gard	6th	Philippe Berta	Ensemble	Philippe Berta	Ensemble	16,921	52.17%	9,107	24.38%	9,582	25.65%	9,018	24.14%	3,439	9.21%		
Haute-Garonne	1st	Pierre Cabaré*	Ensemble	Hadrien Clouet	NUPES	22,113	54.22%	12,314	28.05%	17,468	39.79%	4,279	9.75%	1,637	3.73%		
Haute-Garonne	2nd	Jean-Luc Lagleize	Ensemble	Anne Stambach-Terrenoir	NUPES	26,895	52.90%	14,807	26.81%	20,570	37.25%	7,245	13.12%	3,174	5.75%		
Haute-Garonne	3rd	Corinne Vignon	Ensemble	Corinne Vignon	Ensemble	23,780	55.71%	13,614	29.27%	14,695	31.60%	4,080	8.77%	7,488	16.10%		
Haute-Garonne	4th	Mickaël Nogal	Ensemble	François Piquemal	NUPES	19,467	59.26%	8,273	23.59%	16,321	46.54%	2,512	7.16%	3,084	8.80%		
Haute-Garonne	5th	Jean-François Portarrieu	Ensemble	Jean-François Portarrieu	Ensemble	23,948	51.89%	15,174	28.91%	14,615	27.85%	12,931	24.64%	1,743	3.32%		
Haute-Garonne	6th	Monique Iborra	Ensemble	Monique Iborra	Ensemble	27,570	50.00%	18,437	30.27%	17,904	29.39%	10,231	16.80%	2,658	4.36%		
Haute-Garonne	7th	Élisabeth Toutut-Picard	Ensemble	Christophe Bex	NUPES	23,644	51.17%	13,968	26.53%	16,149	30.68%	12,531	23.80%	16,50	3.13%		
Haute-Garonne	8th	Joël Aviragnet	NUPES	Joël Aviragnet	NUPES	24,191	60.39%	9,281	20.60%	12,920	28.67%	9,843	21.84%	–	–	Annabelle Fauvernier (EELV dissident) with 7,900 votes (17.53%)	
Haute-Garonne	9th	Sandrine Mörch	Ensemble	Christine Arrighi	NUPES	21,748	58.55%	10,265	25.25%	16,167	39.77%	5,781	14.22%	242	4.81%		
Haute-Garonne	10th	Sébastien Nadot	EDD	Dominique Faure	Ensemble	27,118	50.20%	17,720	30.08%	19,535	33.16%	8,947	15.19%	3,088	5.24%		
Gers	1st	Jean-René Cazeneuve	Ensemble	Jean-René Cazeneuve	Ensemble	18,822	52.51%	12,648	31.49%	10,219	25.44%	8,202	20.42%				
Gers	2nd	Gisèle Biémouret*	NUPES	David Taupiac	DVG	22,203	62.98%	7,889	19.41%	7,124	17.53%	6,976	17.16%	4,874	11.99%	David Taupiac (miscellaneous left) with 9,816 votes (24.15%)	
Gironde	1st	Dominique David*	Ensemble	Thomas Cazenave	Ensemble	28,292	59.11%	19,604	38.23%	14,006	27.31%	4,929	9.61%	4,116	8.03%		
Gironde	2nd	Catherine Fabre	Ensemble	Nicolas Thierry	NUPES	19,433	53.34%	12,407	32.83%	17,054	45.12%	1,970	5.21%	2,799	7.41%		
Gironde	3rd	Loïc Prud'homme	NUPES	Loïc Prud'homme	NUPES	24,066	59.27%	12,947	29.46%	19,730	44.89%	4,748	10.80%				
Gironde	4th	Alain David	NUPES	Alain David	NUPES	22,876	59.73%	10,431	24.00%	17,628	40.55%	9,191	21.14%				
Gironde	5th	Benoît Simian	Ensemble	Grégoire de Fournas	RN	26,263	53.28%	14,876	25.47%	15,134	25.92%	16,672	28.55%	2,485	4.26%		
Gironde	6th	Eric Poulliant	Ensemble	Eric Poulliant	Ensemble	26,893	51.85%	19,258	34.83%	18,765	33.93%	8,222	14.87%	2,815	5.09%		
Gironde	7th	Bérangère Couillard	Ensemble	Bérangère Couillard	Ensemble	20,964	52.71%	15,252	36.27%	14,513	34.51%	4,914	11.68%	2,864	6.81%		
Gironde	8th	Sophie Panonacle	Ensemble	Sophie Panonacle	Ensemble	31,442	60.00%	20,943	35.02%	11,269	18.84%	11,798	19.73%	5,964	9.97%		
Gironde	9th	Sophie Mette	Ensemble	Sophie Mette	Ensemble	22,950	50.49%	14,732	28.75%	12,415	24.23%	12,008	23.44%	2,802	5.47%		
Gironde	10th	Florent Boudié	Ensemble	Florent Boudié	Ensemble	19,581	53.26%	13,565	32.70%	9,705	23.40%	11,628	28.03%	–	–		
Gironde	11th	Véronique Hammerer	Ensemble	Edwige Diaz	RN	25,092	58.70%	11,230	23.72%	10,768	22.75%	18,662	39.42%	940	1.99%		
Gironde	12th	Christelle Dubos*	Ensemble	Pascal Lavergne	Ensemble	20,365	50.23%	11,366	24.58%	12,455	26.94%	9,375	20.28%	2,101	4.54%		
Hérault	1st	Patricia Mirallès	Ensemble	Patricia Mirallès	Ensemble	19,338	52.55%	10,087	24.83%	10,943	26.94%	8,360	20.58%	1,466	3.61%		
Hérault	2nd	Muriel Ressiguier	NUPES	Nathalie Oziol	NUPES	17,008	63.33%	5,282	18.52%	11,513	40.37%	2,490	8.73%	476	1.97%	Fatima Bellaredj (PS dissident) with 3,406 votes (11.94%)	
Hérault	3rd	Coralie Dubost*	Ensemble	Laurence Cristol	Ensemble	22,907	53.10%	12,457	26.68%	12,416	26.59%	8,080	17.30%	2,603	5.57%		
Hérault	4th	Jean-François Eliaou	Ensemble	Sébastien Rome	NUPES	26,291	50.65%	12,527	20.87%	16,841	28.06%	13,633	22.71%	1,724	2.87%		
Hérault	5th	Philippe Huppé	Ensemble	Stéphanie Galzy	RN	23,695	54.24%	8,378	17.07%	11,932	24.32%	13,806	28.13%	1,364	2.78%	Aurélien Manenc (PS dissident) with 7,713 votes (15.72%)	
Hérault	6th	Emmanuelle Ménard	RN	Emmanuelle Ménard	RN	26,255	69.83%	6,530	15.62%	7,131	17.05%	–	–	936	2.24%	Emmanuelle Ménard (SE supported by RN) with 19,136 votes (45.76%)	
Hérault	7th	Christophe Euzet	Ensemble	Aurélien Lopez Liguori	RN	27,378	59.19%	10,031	19.35%	11,278	21.75%	16,079	31.01%	5,328	10.28%		
Hérault	8th	Nicolas Démoulin	Ensemble	Sylvain Carrière	NUPES	19,483	50.59%	10,453	24.28%	12,634	29.35%	10,729	24.92%	1,570	3.65%		
Hérault	9th	Patrick Vignal	Ensemble	Patrick Vignal	Ensemble	19,520	54.37%	11,307	28.37%	11,033	27.69%	10,058	25.24%	2,267	5.69%		
Ille-et-Vilaine	1st	Vacant seat		Frédéric Mathieu	NUPES	25,205	52.62%	15,992	32.67%	19,220	39.27%	4,679	9.56%	1,902	3.89%		
Ille-et-Vilaine	2nd	Laurence Maillart-Méhaignerie	Ensemble	Laurence Maillart-Méhaignerie	Ensemble	28,165	51.82%	22,630	41.41%	21,596	39.51%	4,598	8.41%	–	–		
Ille-et-Vilaine	3rd	Claudia Rouaux	NUPES	Claudia Rouaux	NUPES	23,784	51.53%	15,317	32.53%	16,822	35.72%	6,998	14.86%	4,015	8.53%		
Ille-et-Vilaine	4th	Gaël Le Bohec	Ensemble	Mathilde Hignet	NUPES	22,856	50.36%	14,035	29.78%	15,371	32.61%	8,245	17.49%	3,715	7.88%		
Ille-et-Vilaine	5th	Christine Cloarec	Ensemble	Christine Cloarec	Ensemble	29,688	58.66%	18,595	34.43%	14,069	26.05%	7,248	13.42%	9,067	16.79%		
Ille-et-Vilaine	6th	Thierry Benoit	Ensemble	Thierry Benoit	Ensemble	26,431	61.69%	21,513	46.88%	11,762	25.63%	7,618	16.60%	1,825	3.98%		
Ille-et-Vilaine	7th	Gilles Lurton	UDC	Jean-Luc Bourgeaux	UDC	23,705	52.23%	15,330	28.37%	11,486	21.26%	6,861	12.70%	13,736	25.42%		
Ille-et-Vilaine	8th	Florian Bachelier	Ensemble	Mickaël Bouloux	NUPES	28,262	57.97%	15,950	32.26%	22,610	45.72%	3,399	6.87%	1,088	2.20%		
Indre	1st	François Jolivet	Ensemble	François Jolivet	Ensemble	18,158	56.02%	10,152	27.53%	8,313	22.54%	8,225	22.30%	6,705	18.18%		
Indre	2nd	Nicolas Forissier	UDC	Nicolas Forissier	UDC	22,507	58.19%	8,192	18.36%	9,815	22.00%	10,545	23.64%	11,386	25.52%		
Indre-et-Loire	1st	Philippe Chalumeau	Ensemble	Charles Fournier	NUPES	17,457	53.51%	9,545	27.38%	13,803	39.60%	3,251	9.33%	4,129	11.85%		
Indre-et-Loire	2nd	Daniel Labaronne	Ensemble	Daniel Labaronne	Ensemble	22,663	54.71%	15,175	32.38%	12,128	25.88%	10,262	21.90%	3,639	7.77%		
Indre-et-Loire	3rd	Sophie Métadier	UDC	Henri Alfandari	Ensemble	25,792	57.16%	12,686	25.26	12,127	24.15%	9,836	19.59%	10,448	20.81%		
Indre-et-Loire	4th	Fabienne Colboc	Ensemble	Fabienne Colboc	Ensemble	21,185	50.52%	13,666	29.99%	13,461	29.55%	9,044	19.85%	4,349	9.55%		
Indre-et-Loire	5th	Sabine Thillaye	Ensemble	Sabine Thillaye	Ensemble	22,055	59.06%	12,543	29.15%	8,339	19.38%	9,069	21.08%	5,788	13.45%		
Isère	1st	Camille Galliard-Minier*	Ensemble	Olivier Véran	Ensemble	25,512	55.53%	19,543	40.50%	17,785	36.86%	3,407	7.06%	3,217	6.67%		
Isère	2nd	Jean-Charles Colas-Roy	Ensemble	Cyrielle Chatelain	NUPES	16,992	52.13%	10,188	28.45%	12,003	33.52%	6,474	18.08%	1,732	4.84%		
Isère	3rd	Émilie Chalas	Ensemble	Élisa Martin	NUPES	15,326	57.48%	7,112	24.60%	12,284	42.49%	3,424	11.84%	2,049	7.09%		
Isère	4th	Marie-Noëlle Battistel	NUPES	Marie-Noëlle Battistel	NUPES	24,016	58.06%	10,697	23.24%	19,437	42.22%	7,618	16.55%	3,391	7.37%		
Isère	5th	Catherine Kamowski	Ensemble	Jérémie Iordanoff	NUPES	25,010	50.43%	16,651	30.80%	17,457	32.29%	9,909	18.33%	–	–		
Isère	6th	Cendra Motin	Ensemble	Alexis Jolly	RN	18,667	50.92%	10,561	26.17%	8,740	21.66%	12,100	29.98%	5,424	13.44%		
Isère	7th	Monique Limon*	Ensemble	Yannick Neuder	UDC	23,678	59.59%	9,155	19.79%	9,694	20.95%	10,935	23.63%	11,492	24.84%		
Isère	8th	Caroline Abadie	Ensemble	Caroline Abadie	Ensemble	18,251	53.63%	9,113	23.18%	8,995	22.88%	9,007	22.91%	8,213	20.89%		
Isère	9th	Élodie Jacquier-Laforge	Ensemble	Élodie Jacquier-Laforge	Ensemble	24,427	53.80%	14,981	29.96%	15,271	30.54%	9,626	19.25%	6,135	12.27%		
Isère	10th	Marjolaine Meynier-Millefert	Ensemble	Marjolaine Meynier-Millefert	Ensemble	20,282	52.51%	11,347	25.92%	10,485	23.95%	11,817	27.00%	3,861	8.82%		
Jura	1st	Danielle Brulebois	Ensemble	Danielle Brulebois	Ensemble	16,833	56.22%	12,247	36.73%	9,467	28.40%	7,301	21.90%	2,556	7.67%		
Jura	2nd	Marie-Christine Dalloz	UDC	Marie-Christine Dalloz	UDC	15,380	62.10%	5,047	18.60%	6,651	24.51%	4,628	17.06%	8,147	30.03%		
Jura	3rd	Jean-Marie Sermier*	UDC	Justine Gruet	UDC	19,397	58.46%	5,349	14.99%	8,865	24.84%	8,264	23.15%	9,144	25.62%		
Landes	1st	Fabien Lainé*	Ensemble	Geneviève Darrieussecq	Ensemble	27,123	55.81%	18,633	33.39%	12,805	22.95%	11,241	20.15%	3,516	6.30%		
Landes	2nd	Lionel Causse	Ensemble	Lionel Causse	Ensemble	30,305	51.94%	21,175	33.73%	19,015	30.29%	10,116	16.11%	3,008	4.79%		
Landes	3rd	Boris Vallaud	NUPES	Boris Vallaud	NUPES	28,998	59.93%	13,656	24.86%	22,057	40.16%	10,317	18.78%	2,849	5.19%		
Loir-et-Cher	1st	Vacant seat		Marc Fesneau	Ensemble	20,249	56.47%	12,986	31.97%	9,873	24.31%	9,073	22.34%	3,015	7.42%		
Loir-et-Cher	2nd	Guillaume Peltier	REC	Roger Chudeau	RN	18,107	51.07%	8,009	20.28%	6,703	16.97	9,493	24.04%	6,824	17.28%	Guillaume Peltier (Reconquête) with 5,523 votes (13.99%)	
Loir-et-Cher	3rd	Pascal Brindeau	UDC	Christophe Marion	Ensemble	21,161	55.21%	10,357	24.54%	8,144	19.30%	10,141	24.03%	9,161	21.71%		
Loire	1st	Régis Juanico*	NUPES	Quentin Bataillon	Ensemble	13,231	52.10%	6,746	23.50%	6,487	22.60	5,203	18.13%	1,288	4.49%	Pierrick Courbon (PS dissident) with 6,292 votes (21.92%)	
Loire	2nd	Jean-Michel Mis	Ensemble	Andrée Taurinya	NUPES	10,488	50.63%	6,161	27.36%	7,738	34.37%	3,454	15.34%	1,938	8.61%		
Loire	3rd	Valéria Faure-Muntian*	Ensemble	Emmanuel Mandon	Ensemble	18,807	57.32%	9,621	25.70%	8,858	23.66%	7,890	21.08%	5,060	13.52%		
Loire	4th	Dino Cinieri	UDC	Dino Cinieri	UDC	27,847	61.61%	8,224	16.84	11,501	23.56%	10,555	21.62%	12,601	25.81%		
Loire	5th	Nathalie Sarles	Ensemble	Antoine Vermorel-Marques	UDC	24,575	61.72%	11,842	23.41%	10,292	20.35%	9,623	19.03%	13,031	25.77%		
Loire	6th	Julien Borowczyk	Ensemble	Jean-Pierre Taite	UDC	25,050	55.74%	14,590	26.43%	10,482	18.99%	11,527	20.88%	14,001	25.36%		
Haute-Loire	1st	Isabelle Valentin	UDC	Isabelle Valentin	UDC	32,478	70.22%	7,459	14.24%	9,933	18.96%	7,458	14.23%	23,714	45.26%		
Haute-Loire	2nd	Jean-Pierre Vigier	UDC	Jean-Pierre Vigier	UDC	25,621	68.35%	4,764	11.54%	8,166	19.79%	5,618	13.61%	18,850	45.68%		
Loire-Atlantique	1st	François de Rugy*	Ensemble	Mounir Belhamiti	Ensemble	20,367	52.08%	13,067	31.48%	15,343	36.97%	2,652	6.39%	5,212	12.56%		
Loire-Atlantique	2nd	Valérie Oppelt	Ensemble	Andy Kerbrat	NUPES	26,851	55.80%	14,350	28.44%	23,524	46.62%	2,520	4.99%	4,717	9.35%		
Loire-Atlantique	3rd	Anne-France Brunet	Ensemble	Ségolène Amiot	NUPES	24,837	55.70%	13,662	29.30%	19,990	42.87%	4,622	9.91%	2,686	5.76%		
Loire-Atlantique	4th	Aude Amadou	Ensemble	Julie Laernoes	NUPES	26,411	58.03%	13,908	29.35%	20,291	42.82%	4,838	10.21%	2,737	5.78%		
Loire-Atlantique	5th	Luc Geismar*	Ensemble	Sarah El Haïry	Ensemble	33,834	54.41%	24,235	37.45%	21,174	32.72%	7,475	11.55%	2,741	4.24%		
Loire-Atlantique	6th	Yves Daniel*	Ensemble	Jean-Claude Raux	NUPES	26,874	52.84%	13,649	25.19%	17,755	32.77%	9,324	17.21%	5,179	9.56%		
Loire-Atlantique	7th	Sandrine Josso	Ensemble	Sandrine Josso	Ensemble	31,074	57.06%	13,108	22.48%	14,147	24.26%	9,309	15.96%	7,712	13.22%		
Loire-Atlantique	8th	Audrey Dufeu-Schubert	Ensemble	Matthias Tavel	NUPES	21,596	54.45%	11,341	27.05%	13,432	32.04%	6,443	15.37%	1,901	4.53%	Xavier Perrin (PS dissident) with 5,174 votes (12.34%)	
Loire-Atlantique	9th	Yannick Haury	Ensemble	Yannick Haury	Ensemble	31,625	53.12%	16,449	25.59%	18,384	28.60%	11,358	17.67%	3,792	5.90%	Paul Brounais (Horizons dissident) with 7,341 votes (11.42%)	
Loire-Atlantique	10th	Sophie Errante	Ensemble	Sophie Errante	Ensemble	32,852	56.52%	19,638	31.50%	18,699	29.99%	7,011	11.24%	9,377	15.04%		
Loiret	1st	Stéphanie Rist	Ensemble	Stéphanie Rist	Ensemble	20,163	57.21%	13,988	36.49%	10,989	28.67%	5,842	15.24%	4,621	12.06%		
Loiret	2nd	Caroline Janvier	Ensemble	Caroline Janvier	Ensemble	20,535	55.78%	11,978	29.10%	10,338	25.12%	7,911	19.22%	4,811	11.69%		
Loiret	3rd	Claude de Ganay	UDC	Mathilde Paris	RN	16,846	52.22%	7,420	20.92%	6,814	19.21%	10,931	30.82%	4,502	12.69%		
Loiret	4th	Jean-Pierre Door*	UDC	Thomas Ménagé	RN	19,087	63.36%	6,600	18.89%	6,789	19.43%	10,986	31.45%	5,008	14.34%		
Loiret	5th	Marianne Dubois*	UDC	Anthony Brosse	Ensemble	15,747	50.02%	7,597	21.74%	6,594	18.87%	9,741	27.87%	6,520	18.66%		
Loiret	6th	Richard Ramos	Ensemble	Richard Ramos	Ensemble	18,865	57.27%	11,851	32.38%	9,339	25.52%	7,152	19.54%	3,542	9.68%		
Lot	1st	Aurélien Pradié	UDC	Aurélien Pradié	UDC	25,616	64.63%	–	–	9,474	22.26%	3,844	9.03%	19,352	45.46%	Rémi Branco (PS dissident) with 7,118 votes (16.72%)	
Lot	2nd	Huguette Tiegna	Ensemble	Huguette Tiegna	Ensemble	12,745	34.14%	9,103	23.70%	9,116	23.73%	4,735	12.33%	3,119	8.12%	Christophe Proença (PS dissident) with 8,896 votes (23.16%) †	
Lot-et-Garonne	1st	Michel Lauzzana	Ensemble	Michel Lauzzana	Ensemble	20,328	51.48%	13,309	29.64%	11,772†‡	26.21%	12,514	27.87%	2,542	5.66%		
Lot-et-Garonne	2nd	Alexandre Freschi	Ensemble	Hélène Laporte	RN	16,516	39.44%	10,259†	25.62%	10,423	26.03%	12,233	30.55%	2,339	5.84%		
Lot-et-Garonne	3rd	Olivier Damaisin	Ensemble	Annick Cousin	RN	18,747	56.97%	7,802	20.15%	8,871	22.91%	9,664	24.96%	5,361	13.84%		
Lozère	1st	Pierre Morel-À-L'Huissier	UDC	Pierre Morel-À-L'Huissier	UDC	17,355	54.28%	5,996	17.64	8,637	25.41%	3,704	10.90%	6,371	18.74%	Patrice Saint-Leger (miscellaneous right) with 4,663 votes (13.72%)	
Maine-et-Loire	1st	Matthieu Orphelin*	NUPES	François Gernigon	Ensemble	22,724	55.52%	15,381	34.90%	13,163	29.87%	5,484	12.44%	4,508	10.23%		
Maine-et-Loire	2nd	Stella Dupont	Ensemble	Stella Dupont	Ensemble	25,005	56.76%	18,583	39.72%	13,659	29.27%	5,735	12.29&	2,833	6.075		
Maine-et-Loire	3rd	Anne-Laure Blin	UDC	Anne-Laure Blin	UDC	19,020	60.65%	7,290	21.65%	7,803	23.18%	7,411	22.01%	8,328	24.73%		
Maine-et-Loire	4th	Laëtitia Saint-Paul	Ensemble	Laëtitia Saint-Paul	Ensemble	19,913	60.33%	14,298	38.63%	8,544	23.09%	7,308	19.75%	2,598	7.02%		
Maine-et-Loire	5th	Denis Masséglia	Ensemble	Denis Masséglia	Ensemble	19,395	60.76%	11,073	31.63%	8,039	22.96	4,588	13.10%	–	–	Jacquelin Ligot (miscellaneous right) with 6,472 votes (18.48%)	
Maine-et-Loire	6th	Nicole Dubré-Chirat	Ensemble	Nicole Dubré-Chirat	Ensemble	24,616	57.60%	14,074	31.04%	12,596	27.78%	7,229	15.94%	1,894	4.18%	Bernadette Humeau (miscellaneous centre) with 5,550 votes (12.24%)	
Maine-et-Loire	7th	Philippe Bolo	Ensemble	Philippe Bolo	Ensemble	20,865	55.56%	16,333	40.81%	12,136	30.32%	6,039	15.09%	–	–		
Manche	1st	Philippe Gosselin	UDC	Philippe Gosselin	UDC	27,166	68.78%	7,421	17.46%	8,265	19.44%	7,045	16.57	16,786	39.48%		
Manche	2nd	Bertrand Sorre	Ensemble	Bertrand Sorre	Ensemble	28,279	64.44%	20,620	42.62%	8,948	18.50%	8,700	17.98%	3,860	7.98%		
Manche	3rd	Stéphane Travert	Ensemble	Stéphane Travert	Ensemble	27,829	56.13%	18,678	33.77%	13,088	23.66%	10,274	18.58%	7,992	14.45%		
Manche	4th	Sonia Krimi	Ensemble	Anna Pic	NUPES	20,482	51.61%	12,664	30.14%	13,280	31.61%	7,120	16.95%	4,720	11.23%		
Marne	1st	Valérie Beauvais	UDC	Xavier Albertini	Ensemble	15,897	55.91%	9,120	28.51%	7,737	24.19%	6,485	20.28%	4,975	15.55%		
Marne	2nd	Aina Kuric	Ensemble	Anne-Sophie Frigout	RN	14,655	54.82%	6,964	21.23%	7,369	22.46%	7,213	21.98%	3,565	10.87%	Aina Kuric (Horizons dissident) with 4,103 votes (12.51%)	
Marne	3rd	Éric Girardin	Ensemble	Éric Girardin	Ensemble	16,836	51.43%	10,841	30.77%	6,302	17.88%	10,215	28.99%	3,169	8.99%		
Marne	4th	Lise Magnier	Ensemble	Lise Magnier	Ensemble	17,294	55.33%	11,329	33.20%	6,411	18.79%	9,533	27.93%	3,461	10.14%		
Marne	5th	Charles de Courson	UDC	Charles de Courson	UDC	21,325	63.03%	3,268	8.91%	4,066	11.09%	9,989	27.24%	16,329	44.54%		
Haute-Marne	1st	Sylvain Templier*	Ensemble	Christophe Bentz	RN	16,201	51.25%	7,342	21.15%	5,622	16.20%	9,479	27.31%	4,660	13.42%	Théo Caviezel (miscellaneous) with 3,635 votes (10.47%)	
Haute-Marne	2nd	François Cornut-Gentille	UDC	Laurence Robert-Dehault	RN	13,877	51.70%	3,122	11.31%	3,438	12.46%	10,928	39.60%	7,686	27.85%		
Mayenne	1st	Guillaume Garot	NUPES	Guillaume Garot	NUPES	20,178	63.22%	8,415	23.61%	17,684	49.62%	4,744	13.31%	2,317	6.50%		
Mayenne	2nd	Géraldine Bannier	Ensemble	Géraldine Bannier	Ensemble	19,812	58.62%	10,019	27.10%	8,834	23.89%	5,966	16.14%	2,804	7.58%	Christophe Langouet (LREM dissident) with 7,053 votes (19.08%)	
Mayenne	3rd	Yannick Favennec Becot	Ensemble	Yannick Favennec Becot	Ensemble	19,187	57.13%	19,187	57.13%	6,491	19.33%	5,335	15.88%	–	–		
Meurthe-et-Moselle	1st	Carole Grandjean	Ensemble	Carole Grandjean	Ensemble	19,520	53.43%	13,159	33.69%	12,822	32.83%	5,669	14.51%	2,995	7.67%		
Meurthe-et-Moselle	2nd	Pascale César*	Ensemble	Emmanuel Lacresse	Ensemble	15,689	50.26%	10,448	31.60%	12,101	36.59%	4,427	13.39%	2,753	8.33%		
Meurthe-et-Moselle	3rd	Xavier Paluszkiewicz	Ensemble	Martine Étienne	NUPES	13,886	51.94%	7,429	25.16%	7,345	24.88%	7,061	23.92%	1,814	6.14%		
Meurthe-et-Moselle	4th	Thibault Bazin	UDC	Thibault Bazin	UDC	24,952	62.18%	7,170	15.76%	8,727	19.18%	11,825	25.99%	14,239	31.29%		
Meurthe-et-Moselle	5th	Dominique Potier	NUPES	Dominique Potier	NUPES	21,782	63.12%	5,268	14.13%	–	–	10,216	27.40%	1,735	4.65%	Dominique Potier (DVG) with 16,393 votes (43.97%)	
Meurthe-et-Moselle	6th	Caroline Fiat	NUPES	Caroline Fiat	NUPES	16,133	50.23%	6,705	18.19%	11,048	29.97%	10,501	28.48%	3,570	9.68%		
Meuse	1st	Bertrand Pancher	UDC	Bertrand Pancher	UDC	19,028	55.40%	4,797	13.38%	6,272	17.49%	10,914	30.43%	–	–	Bertrand Pancher (miscellaneous right) with 10,826 votes (30.19%)	
Meuse	2nd	Émilie Cariou	NUPES	Florence Goulet	RN	13,269	53.50%	5,101	19.17%	4,318	16.23%	8,695	32.68%	3,588	13.49%		
Morbihan	1st	Hervé Pellois*	Ensemble	Anne Le Hénanff	Ensemble	34,382	59.25%	21,004	34.05%	15,432	25.01%	7,145	11.58%	5,009	8.12%		
Morbihan	2nd	Jimmy Pahun	Ensemble	Jimmy Pahun	Ensemble	32,026	58.60%	19,426	32.94%	14,667	24.87%	9,054	15.35%	3,009	5.10%		
Morbihan	3rd	Nicole Le Peih	Ensemble	Nicole Le Peih	Ensemble	24,283	56.64%	13,902	29.13%	10,744	22.51%	8,938	18.73%	8,113	17.00%		
Morbihan	4th	Paul Molac	DVG	Paul Molac	DVG	37,678	73.43%	10,624	18.26%	10,589	18.20%	9,377	16.12%	1,293	2.22%	Paul Molac (miscellaneous left) with 21,900 votes (37.65%)	
Morbihan	5th	Gwendal Rouillard*	Ensemble	Lysiane Metayer	Ensemble	19,666	51.35%	9,423	22.96%	12,916	31.47%	5,307	12.93%	–	–	Ronan Loas (Horizons dissident) with 8,785 votes (21.41%)	
Morbihan	6th	Jean-Michel Jacques	Ensemble	Jean-Michel Jacques	Ensemble	23,925	54.81%	16,452	34.79%	12,335	26.08%	10,213	21.60%	1,724	3.65%		
Moselle	1st	Belkhir Belhaddad	Ensemble	Belkhir Belhaddad	Ensemble	17,532	53.59%	8,983	24.29%	8,714	23.56%	9,385	25.37%	4,022	10.87%		
Moselle	2nd	Ludovic Mendes	Ensemble	Ludovic Mendes	Ensemble	16,764	56.41%	8,005	23.88%	7,188	21.44%	6,871	20.49%	4,852	14.47%		
Moselle	3rd	Richard Lioger	Ensemble	Charlotte Leduc	NUPES	14,012	51.46%	5,012	14.87%	8,178	24.27%	6,192	18.37%	3,550	10.53%	Marie-Jo Zimmermann (Hor dissident) with 4,540 votes (13.47%)	
Moselle	4th	Fabien Di Filippo	UDC	Fabien Di Filippo	UDC	22,655	69.30%	4,973	13.44%	4,912	13.28%	7,853	21.22%	17,014	45.98%		
Moselle	5th	Nicole Gries-Trisse	Ensemble	Vincent Seitlinger	UDC	16,413	59.12%	6,802	23.48%	4,216	14.55%	7,498	25.88%	7,108	24.53%		
Moselle	6th	Christophe Arend	Ensemble	Kevin Pfeffer	RN	12,368	56.96%	5,122	22.13%	4,009	17.32%	7,077	30.58%	2,263	9.78%		
Moselle	7th	Hélène Zannier	Ensemble	Alexandre Loubet	RN	18,424	55.41%	7,851	22.08%	7,013	19.72%	12,018	33.80%	5,671	15.95%		
Moselle	8th	Brahim Hammouche	Ensemble	Laurent Jacobelli	RN	15,176	52.43%	7,455	23.49%	8,750	27.57%	11,167	35.18%	1,120	3.53%		
Moselle	9th	Isabelle Rauch	Ensemble	Isabelle Rauch	Ensemble	20,048	55.03%	13,406	32.56%	9,126	22.16%	8,918	21.66%	2,798	6.80%		
Nièvre	1st	Perrine Goulet	Ensemble	Perrine Goulet	Ensemble	16,554	54.43%	11,287	32.71%	8,863	25.69%	9,205	26.68%	1,770	5.13%		
Nièvre	2nd	Patrice Perrot	Ensemble	Patrice Perrot	Ensemble	15,577	36.59%	11,010	26.83%	10,004†	24.38%	11,438	27.87%	4,450	10.84%		
Nord	1st	Adrien Quatennens	NUPES	Adrien Quatennens	NUPES	17,428	65.24%	6,071	21.07%	15,000	52.05%	2,960	10.27%	1,984	6.88%		
Nord	2nd	Ugo Bernalicis	NUPES	Ugo Bernalicis	NUPES	21,740	58.00%	9,823	24.82%	17,212	43.49%	5,328	13.46%	3,106	7.85%		
Nord	3rd	Christophe Di Pompeo	Ensemble	Benjamin Saint-Huile	DVG	18,448	51.70%	5,455	15.02%	5,510	15.17%	11,323	31.18%	4,246	11.69%	Benjamin Saint-Huile (miscellaneous left) with 6,806 votes (18.74%)	
Nord	4th	Brigitte Liso	Ensemble	Brigitte Liso	Ensemble	25,447	56.05%	14,658	30.15%	13,440	27.65%	6,780	13.95%	3,051	6.28%	Jacques Houssin (Miscellaneous right) with 5,893 votes (12.12%)	
Nord	5th	Sébastien Huyghe	UDC	Victor Catteau	RN	20,658	51.14%	12,012	24.56%	12,213	24.98%	12,211	24.97%	8,562	17.51%		
Nord	6th	Charlotte Lecocq	Ensemble	Charlotte Lecocq	Ensemble	27,387	63.32%	16,307	33.60%	9,679	19.94%	9,614	19.81%	6,876	14.17%		
Nord	7th	Valérie Six	UDC	Félicie Gérard	Ensemble	16,600	55.47%	8,596	26.77%	8,483	26.41%	5,141	16.01%	5,758	17.93%		
Nord	8th	Catherine Osson	Ensemble	David Guiraud	NUPES	12,585	59.94%	5,267	24.16%	8,684	39.83%	4,346	19.93%	1,264	5.80%		
Nord	9th	Valérie Petit*	Ensemble	Violette Spillebout	Ensemble	23,990	59.10%	13,889	31.92%	11,841	27.22%	4,190	9.63%	8,897	20.45%		
Nord	10th	Vincent Ledoux*	Ensemble	Gérald Darmanin	Ensemble	16,193	63.60%	11,950	39.08%	7,059	23.08%	6,709	21.94%	934	3.05%		
Nord	11th	Florence Morlighem	Ensemble	Roger Vicot	NUPES	22,143	56.27%	10,953	25.57%	15,178	35.43%	7,355	17.17%	3,765	8.79%		
Nord	12th	Anne-Laure Cattelot	Ensemble	Michaël Taverne	RN	20,415	52.82%	11,055	27.31%	7,945	19.63%	13,727	33.91%	3,268	8.07%		
Nord	13th	Christian Hutin*	MDC	Christine Decodts	Ensemble	16,524	52.37%	11,317	32.56%	8,394	24.15%	10,506	30.23%	1,390	4.00%		
Nord	14th	Paul Christophe	Ensemble	Paul Christophe	Ensemble	22,916	53.21%	15,582	33.75%	7,861	17.03%	13,032	28.23%	4,931	10.68%		
Nord	15th	Jennifer de Temmerman*	NUPES	Pierrick Berteloot	RN	21,367	54.09%	8,804	17.60%	9,200	20.03%	12,133	26.42%	4,910	10.69%		
Nord	16th	Alain Bruneel	NUPES	Matthieu Marchio	RN	16321	50.34%	5,245	15.15%	11,632	33.59%	12,416	35.86%	1,838	5.31%		
Nord	17th	Dimitri Houbron	Ensemble	Thibaut Francois	RN	15,408	53.57%	7,636	24.13%	7,250	22.91%	10,414	32.91%	1,688	5.33%		
Nord	18th	Guy Bricout	UDC	Guy Bricout	UDC	19,211	50.58%	4,980	12.32%	6,207	15.35%	12,074	29.86%	8,835	21.85%		
Nord	19th	Sébastien Chenu	RN	Sébastien Chenu	RN	17,451	57.15%	5,839	17.55%	8,532	25.64%	14,758	44.35%	1,106	3.32%		
Nord	20th	Fabien Roussel	NUPES	Fabien Roussel	NUPES	16,439	54.50%	4,654	14.69%	10,819	34.15%	10,334	32.62%	–	–		
Nord	21st	Béatrice Descamps	UDC	Béatrice Descamps	UDC	17,199	57.12%	–	–	7,798	23.48%	9,508	28.62%	11,769	35.43%		
Oise	1st	Victor Habert-Dassault	UDC	Victor Habert-Dassault	UDC	20,480	58.34%	5,019	12.84%	7,281	18.62%	10,780	27.57%	12,692	32.46%		
Oise	2nd	Agnès Thill	UDC	Philippe Ballard	RN	21,451	55.83%	8,900	21.53%	6,536	15.81%	14,440	34.92%	3,545	8.57%		
Oise	3rd	Pascal Bois	Ensemble	Alexandre Sabatou	RN	14,066	52.42%	6,415	21.41%	7,885	26.31%	9,031	30.14%	3,184	10.63%		
Oise	4th	Éric Woerth	Ensemble	Éric Woerth	Ensemble	21,201	54.35%	12,044	27.00%	7,883	17.67%	10,772	24.15%	5,950	13.34%		
Oise	5th	Pierre Vatin	UDC	Pierre Vatin	UDC	18,430	59.78%	6,860	20.05%	7,298	21.33%	8,362	24.44%	7,935	23.19%		
Oise	6th	Carole Bureau-Bonnard	Ensemble	Michel Guiniot	RN	17,135	52.55%	7,875	21.84%	6,475	17.95%	10,322	28.62%	5,133	14.23%		
Oise	7th	Maxime Minot	UDC	Maxime Minot	UDC	18,442	56.74%	4,845	13.88%	9,275	26.56%	8,745	25.05%	9,191	26.32%		
Orne	1st	Chantal Jourdan	NUPES	Chantal Jourdan	NUPES	14,776	50.20%	7,572	23.17%	8,448	25.85%	6,723	20.57%	6,231	19.06%		
Orne	2nd	Véronique Louwagie	UDC	Véronique Louwagie	UDC	18 118	60.80%	4,562	13.87%	5,318	16.17%	8,067	24.53%	10,759	32.72%		
Orne	3rd	Jérôme Nury	UDC	Jérôme Nury	UDC	21,603	69.66%	4,787	13.71%	6,090	17.44%	6,135	17.57%	13,050	37.38%		
Pas-de-Calais	1st	Bruno Duvergé	Ensemble	Emmanuel Blairy	RN	27,380	55.77%	12,396	24.32%	7,579	14.87%	18,153	35.61%	6,446	12.65%		
Pas-de-Calais	2nd	Jacqueline Maquet	Ensemble	Jacqueline Maquet	Ensemble	20,971	54.73%	12,234	28.47%	9,660	22.48%	10,604	24.68%	4,004	9.32%		
Pas-de-Calais	3rd	Emmanuel Blairy	RN	Jean-Marc Tellier	NUPES	16,294	50.11%	4,379	12.87%	12,101	35.56%	13,050	38.35%	568	1.67%		
Pas-de-Calais	4th	Robert Therry*	UDC	Philippe Fait	Ensemble	23,331	56.36%	13,168	29.71%	7,683	17.33%	10,378	23.42%	8,782	19.81%		
Pas-de-Calais	5th	Jean-Pierre Pont	Ensemble	Jean-Pierre Pont	Ensemble	8,102	51.03%	9,923	24.93%	7,179	18.03%	10,691	26.86%	–	–	(Miscellaneous left) with 7,295 votes (18.32%)	
Pas-de-Calais	6th	Christophe Leclercq*	Ensemble	Christine Engrand	RN	21,858	50.06%	14,667	32.10%	7,302	15.98%	13,857	30.33%	4,500	9.85%		
Pas-de-Calais	7th	Pierre-Henri Dumont	UDC	Pierre-Henri Dumont	UDC	20,132	55.83%	6,063	15.65%	7,468	19.28%	11,313	29.21%	10,570	27.29%		
Pas-de-Calais	8th	Benoît Potterie	Ensemble	Bertrand Petit	DVG	22,801	55.82%	9,440	21.36%	6,961	15.75%	12,140	27.46%	2,235	5.06%	Bertrand Petit (DVG) with 9,961 (22.54%)	
Pas-de-Calais	9th	Marguerite Deprez-Audebert	Ensemble	Caroline Parmentier	RN	18,587	53.31%	8,626	22.90%	6,021	15.98%	11,596	30.78%	3,622	9.62%		
Pas-de-Calais	10th	Myriane Houplain	REC	Thierry Frappé	RN	22,685	65.40%	6,945	18.18%	6,587	17.25%	18,230	47.73%	903	2.36%		
Pas-de-Calais	11th	Marine Le Pen	RN	Marine Le Pen	RN	22,301	61.03%	4,846	12.32%	9,214	23.43%	21,219	53.96%	–	–		
Pas-de-Calais	12th	Bruno Bilde	RN	Bruno Bilde	RN	20,855	56.30%	5,927	14.92%	11,703	29.47%	16,609	41.82%	766	1.93%		
Puy-de-Dôme	1st	Valérie Thomas	Ensemble	Marianne Maximi	NUPES	18,189	52.23%	10,466	27.33%	13,211	34.50%	5,617	14.67%	4,320	11.28%		
Puy-de-Dôme	2nd	Christine Pirès-Beaune	NUPES	Christine Pirès-Beaune	NUPES	26,613	63.84%	9,017	18.81%	20,055	41.84%	7,862	16.40%	7,332	15.30%		
Puy-de-Dôme	3rd	Laurence Vichnievsky	Ensemble	Laurence Vichnievsky	Ensemble	23,042	53.09%	13,525	28.33%	14,363	30.08%	5,759	12.06%	6,839	14.32%		
Puy-de-Dôme	4th	Michel Fanget	Ensemble	Delphine Lingemann	Ensemble	22,680	50.13%	12,870	25.48%	15,519	30.73%	8,379	16.59%	8,159	16.15%		
Puy-de-Dôme	5th	André Chassaigne	NUPES	André Chassaigne	NUPES	30,966	69.43%	9,157	17.52%	25,686	49.13%	9,964	19.06	4,172	7.98%		
Pyrénées-Atlantiques	1st	Josy Poueyto	Ensemble	Josy Poueyto	Ensemble	16,929	50.78%	11,243	31.57%	11,318	31.78%	4,991	14.01%	2,709	7.61%		
Pyrénées-Atlantiques	2nd	Jean-Paul Mattei	Ensemble	Jean-Paul Mattei	Ensemble	21,720	54.71%	14,826	34.20%	11,040	25.47%	7,128	16.44%	–	–		
Pyrénées-Atlantiques	3rd	David Habib	DVG	David Habib	DVG	26,414	66.55%	–	–	9,211	20.63%	6,847	15.34%	7,342	16.45%	David Habib (PS dissident) with 16,345 votes (36.61%)	
Pyrénées-Atlantiques	4th	Jean Lassalle*	RES	Iñaki Echaniz	NUPES	19,936	50.11%	11,508	26.65%	10,395	24.07%	5,015	11.61%	–	–	Julien Lassalle (Résistons !) with 8,751 votes (20.27%)	Egoitz Urrutikoetxea (EH Bai) with 4,333 votes (10.03%)
Pyrénées-Atlantiques	5th	Florence Lasserre-David	Ensemble	Florence Lasserre-David	Ensemble	24,184	54.40%	16,657	33.98%	12,323	25.14%	6,795	13.86%	–	–		
Pyrénées-Atlantiques	6th	Vincent Bru	Ensemble	Vincent Bru	Ensemble	27,994	60.21%	15,023	28.51%	10,302	19.55%	5,209	9.89%	2,618	4.97%	Peio Dufau (EH Bai) with 7,667 votes (14.55%)	
Hautes-Pyrénées	1st	Jean-Bernard Sempastous	Ensemble	Sylvie Ferrer	NUPES	20,657	50.13%	11,029	23.59%	11,540	24.69%	7,396	15.82%	2,328	4.98%	Maryse Beyrié (PRG) with 9,317 votes (19.93%)	
Hautes-Pyrénées	2nd	Jeanine Dubié*	PRG	Benoît Mournet	Ensemble	21,073	52.28%	10,870	23.75%	10,504	22.95%	8,483	18.54%	2,770	6.05%	Jérôme Crampe (PRG) with 6,555 votes (14.32%)	
Pyrénées-Orientales	1st	Romain Grau	Ensemble	Sophie Blanc	RN	15,859	53.87%	7,952	24.54%	7,659	23.63%	10,162	31.36%	1,799	5.55%		
Pyrénées-Orientales	2nd	Catherine Pujol*	RN	Anaïs Sabatini	RN	26,682	61.23%	9,700	20.49%	9,601	20.28%	17,812	37.62%	4,182	8.83%		
Pyrénées-Orientales	3rd	Laurence Gayte	Ensemble	Sandrine Dogor-Such	RN	19,299	54.11%	9,902	24.36%	11,091	27.29%	11,247	27.67%	2,359	5.80%		
Pyrénées-Orientales	4th	Sébastien Cazenove	Ensemble	Michèle Martinez	RN	24,332	56.28%	10,799	21.81%	10,294	20.79%	15,056	30.40%	2,396	4.84%		
Bas-Rhin	1st	Thierry Michels*	Ensemble	Sandra Regol	NUPES	15,569	51.47%	9,085	28.88%	11,976	38.07%	2,061	6.55%	1479	4.70%		
Bas-Rhin	2nd	Sylvain Waserman	Ensemble	Emmanuel Fernandes	NUPES	16,990	51.23%	10,506	30.31%	12,785	36.89%	3,977	11.47%	2,211	6.38%		
Bas-Rhin	3rd	Bruno Studer	Ensemble	Bruno Studer	Ensemble	16,357	54.53%	11,123	34.75%	9,864	30.82%	4,309	13.46%	1,758	5.49%		
Bas-Rhin	4th	Martine Wonner	EPL	Françoise Buffet	Ensemble	26,856	66.06%	14,554	31.38%	7,952	17.15%	7,931	17.10%	6,838	14.75%		
Bas-Rhin	5th	Antoine Herth*	Ensemble	Charles Sitzenstuhl	Ensemble	25,426	60.67%	15,550	32.62%	7,653	16.05%	10,052	21.09%	4,553	9.55%		
Bas-Rhin	6th	Philippe Meyer	UDC	Louise Morel	Ensemble	23,080	57.90%	11,267	25.35%	7,380	16.61%	10,065	22.65%	9,069	20.41%		
Bas-Rhin	7th	Patrick Hetzel	UDC	Patrick Hetzel	UDC	21,676	64.03%	5,206	13.56%	4,852	12.63%	8,183	21.31%	13,445	35.01%		
Bas-Rhin	8th	Frédéric Reiss*	UDC	Stéphanie Kochert	Ensemble	21,373	56.64%	9,849	24.59%	3,951	9.86%	10,527	26.28%	8,808	21.99%		
Bas-Rhin	9th	Vincent Thiébaut	Ensemble	Vincent Thiébaut	Ensemble	22,108	59.79%	11,748	28.52%	6,030	14.64%	9,043	21.96%	8,695	21.11%		
Haut-Rhin	1st	Yves Hemedinger	UDC	Brigitte Klinkert	Ensemble	14,141	50.21%	11,791	34.58%	5,027	14.74%	5,866	17.20%	7,014	20.57%		
Haut-Rhin	2nd	Jacques Cattin	UDC	Hubert Ott	Ensemble	17,947	52.90%	12,272	28.51%'	6,797	15.79%	7,893	18.34%	8,907	20.69%		
Haut-Rhin	3rd	Jean-Luc Reitzer*	UDC	Didier Lemaire	Ensemble	18,757	53.88%	7,563	19.66%	4,774	12.41%	7,838	20.38%	6,894	17.93%		
Haut-Rhin	4th	Raphaël Schellenberger	UDC	Raphaël Schellenberger	UDC	22,161	54.98%	8,469	19.09%	6,792	15.31%	11,622	26.19%	9,874	22.25%		
Haut-Rhin	5th	Olivier Becht	Ensemble	Olivier Becht	Ensemble	18,443	64.63%	12,801	40.31%	6,452	20.32%	5,122	16.13%	1,717	5.41%		
Haut-Rhin	6th	Bruno Fuchs	Ensemble	Bruno Fuchs	Ensemble	18,604	55.31%	11,996	32.17%	7,186	19.27%	9,415	25.25%	1,618	4.34%		
Rhône	1st	Thomas Rudigoz	Ensemble	Thomas Rudigoz	Ensemble	18,803	51.86%	12,792	32.96%	14,654	37.75%	3,617	9.32%	3,377	8.70%		
Rhône	2nd	Hubert Julien-Laferrière	NUPES	Hubert Julien-Laferrière	NUPES	20,847	51.64%	12,562	28.72%	15,232	34.82%	2,392	5.47%	4,077	9.32%		
Rhône	3rd	Jean-Louis Touraine*	Ensemble	Marie-Charlotte Garin	NUPES	21,105	54.79%	11,681	28.51%	17,767	43.36%	2,983	7.28%	3,403	8.30%		
Rhône	4th	Anne Brugnera	Ensemble	Anne Brugnera	Ensemble	24,338	59.13%	15,566	34.10%	14,479	31.72%	3,300	7.23%	7,530	16.49%		
Rhône	5th	Blandine Brocard	Ensemble	Blandine Brocard	Ensemble	29,199	67.32%	17,508	36.12%	11,063	22.82%	5,865	12.10%	8,449	17.43%		
Rhône	6th	Vacant seat		Gabriel Amard	NUPES	20,397	55.54%	10,777	26.90%	16,545	41.30%	4,328	10.80%	700	1.75%		
Rhône	7th	Anissa Khedher	Ensemble	Alexandre Vincendet	UDC	14,801	53.44%	4,728	17.29%	8,476	30.99%	3,108	11.36%	6,526	23.86%		
Rhône	8th	Nathalie Serre	UDC	Nathalie Serre	UDC	21,855	50.81%	15,714	28.85%	10,483	19.25%	8,713	16.00%	11,965	21.97%		
Rhône	9th	Bernard Perrut*	UDC	Alexandre Portier	UDC	22,385	61.51%	10,284	22.06%	9,437	20.24%	8,500	18.23%	12,885	27.64%		
Rhône	10th	Thomas Gassilloud	Ensemble	Thomas Gassilloud	Ensemble	30,089	65.31%	18,630	36.10%	11,640	22.56%	–	–	8,295	16.07%	Agnès Marion (Reconquête) with 5,834 votes (11.31%)	
Rhône	11th	Jean-Luc Fugit	Ensemble	Jean-Luc Fugit	Ensemble	25,864	64.09%	14,112	30.55%	9,979	21.60%	9,271	20.07%	6,993	15.14%		
Rhône	12th	Cyrille Isaac-Sibille	Ensemble	Cyrille Isaac-Sibille	Ensemble	24,244	62.92%	13,413	30.70%	10,063	23.03%	4,611	10.55%	9,647	22.08%		
Rhône	13th	Danièle Cazarian*	Ensemble	Sarah Tanzilli	Ensemble	22,378	63.15%	11,511	28.44%	8,771	21.67%	8,766	21.66%	6,273	15.50%		
Rhône	14th	Yves Blein	Ensemble	Idir Boumertit	NUPES	13,798	56.69%	6,857	25.47%	9,626	35.76%	5,846	21.71%	–	–		
Haute-Saône	1st	Barbara Bessot Ballot	Ensemble	Antoine Villedieu	RN	22,497	54.50%	10,155	22.43%	8,530	18.84%	13,441	29.69%	8,943	19.75%		
Haute-Saône	2nd	Christophe Lejeune	Ensemble	Emeric Salmon	RN	22,245	54.38%	11,353	25.69%	9,188	20.79%	14573	32.98%	4,337	9.82%		
Saône-et-Loire	1st	Benjamin Dirx	Ensemble	Benjamin Dirx	Ensemble	18,349	57.25%	13,041	36.07%	9,965	27.57%	6909	19.11%	2615	7.23%		
Saône-et-Loire	2nd	Josiane Corneloup	UDC	Josiane Corneloup	UDC	22,823	66.65%	6,188	16.24%	7,627	20.01%	7,179	18.84%	14,031	36.81%		
Saône-et-Loire	3rd	Rémy Rebeyrotte	Ensemble	Rémy Rebeyrotte	Ensemble	18,593	53.75%	12,500	31.74%	8,346	21.19%	10,077	25.59%	4,119	10.46%		
Saône-et-Loire	4th	Cécile Untermaier	NUPES	Cécile Untermaier	NUPES	19,421	56.30%	7,893	20.40%	13,144	33.97%	9,733	25.15%	4,952	12.80%		
Saône-et-Loire	5th	Raphaël Gauvain	Ensemble	Louis Margueritte	Ensemble	17,893	52.66%	9,578	23.71%	9,534	23.60%	7,682	19.02%	8,516	21.08%		
Sarthe	1st	Damien Pichereau*	Ensemble	Julie Delpech	Ensemble	17,300	54.90%	8,517	24.75%	7,903	22.97%	6,150	17.87%	6,000	17.44%		
Sarthe	2nd	Marietta Karamanli	NUPES	Marietta Karamanli	NUPES	20,399	63.06%	6,517	18.79%	12,667	36.53%	7,261	20.94%	2,985	8.61%		
Sarthe	3rd	Pascale Fontenel-Personne*	Ensemble	Éric Martineau	Ensemble	18,394	50.97%	10,071	26.05%	8,193	21.19%	10,570	27.34%	4,439	11.48%		
Sarthe	4th	Sylvie Tolmont	DVG	Élise Leboucher	NUPES	14,891	50.15%	6,876	19.09%	7,878	21.87%	7,672	21.30%	4,261	11.83%	Sylvie Tolmont (PS dissident) with 5,574 votes (15.47%)	
Sarthe	5th	Jean-Carles Grelier	Ensemble	Jean-Carles Grelier	Ensemble	21,174	59.51%	13,267	33.73%	7,768	19.75%	8,944	22.74%	1,619	4.12%		
Savoie	1st	Typhanie Degois*	Ensemble	Marina Ferrari	Ensemble	24,051	59.33%	12,700	27.40%	9,933	21.43%	9,247	19.95%	5,677	12.25%		
Savoie	2nd	Vincent Rolland	UDC	Vincent Rolland	UDC	20,474	64.08%	5,470	15.72%	7,635	21.94%	6,870	19.74%	10,720	30.80%		
Savoie	3rd	Émilie Bonnivard	UDC	Émilie Bonnivard	UDC	23,149	65.54%	6,095	15.78%	8,793	22.76%	7,561	19.57%	12,788	33.10%		
Savoie	4th	Patrick Mignola	Ensemble	Jean-François Coulomme	NUPES	18,083	50.85%	10,306	26.21%	13,548	34.45%	6,354	16.16%	3,995	10.16%		
Haute-Savoie	1st	Véronique Riotton	Ensemble	Véronique Riotton	Ensemble	29,312	62.65%	19,000	36.35%	12,464	23.85%	8,472	16.21%	6,830	13.07%		
Haute-Savoie	2nd	Jacques Rey*	Ensemble	Antoine Armand	Ensemble	25,809	59.88%	11,329	23.83%	10,931	22.99%	6,345	13.34%	9,093	19.12%		
Haute-Savoie	3rd	Christelle Petex-Levet	UDC	Christelle Petex-Levet	UDC	23,882	63.36%	9,087	22.90%	9,831	24.78%	7,296	18.39%	9,129	23.01%		
Haute-Savoie	4th	Virginie Duby-Muller	UDC	Virginie Duby-Muller	UDC	23,171	66.92%	7,678	20.86%	7,990	21.71%	4,455	12.10%	11,501	31.24%		
Haute-Savoie	5th	Marion Lenne*	Ensemble	Anne-Cécile Violland	Ensemble	23,896	60.14%	12,323	28.06%	9,600	21.86%	7,070	16.10%	5,124	11.67%		
Haute-Savoie	6th	Xavier Roseren	Ensemble	Xavier Roseren	Ensemble	19,398	63.11%	11,670	32.68%	6,572	18.40%	6,853	19.19%	2,347	6.57%		
Paris	1st	Sylvain Maillard	Ensemble	Sylvain Maillard	Ensemble	28,656	65.57%	19,718	41.93%	12,780	27.18%	1,357	2.89%	4,479	9.52%		
Paris	2nd	Gilles Le Gendre	Ensemble	Gilles Le Gendre	Ensemble	25,472	63.39%	15,547	35.66%	11,890	27.27%	1,294	2.97%	7,948	18.23%		
Paris	3rd	Stanislas Guerini	Ensemble	Stanislas Guerini	Ensemble	19,613	51.00%	12,851	32.50%	15,284	38.66%	1,658	4.19%	5,204	13.16%		
Paris	4th	Brigitte Kuster	UDC	Astrid Panosyan-Bouvet	Ensemble	19,159	55.45%	15,728	41.03%	5,087	13.27%	1,412	3.68%	11,085	28.92%		
Paris	5th	Vacant seat		Julien Bayou	NUPES	24,857	58.05%	13,358	29.75%	21,942	48.88%	1,277	2.84%	2,147	4.78%		
Paris	6th	Pierre Person*	Ensemble	Sophia Chikirou	NUPES	24,155	53.7%	11,514	25.62%	24,155	53.74%	1,507	3.35%	1,767	3.93%		
Paris	7th	Pacôme Rupin*	Ensemble	Clément Beaune	Ensemble	22,916	50.73%	16,755	35.81%	19,373	41.40%	1,503	3.21%	2,370	5.06%		
Paris	8th	Laetitia Avia	Ensemble	Éva Sas	NUPES	23,825	54.08%	13,059	27.94%	19,490	41.70%	2,165	4.63%	5,282	11.30%		
Paris	9th	Buon Tan	Ensemble	Sandrine Rousseau	NUPES	20,635	58.05%	10,192	26.77%	16,330	42.90%	1,898	4.99%	2,745	7.21%		
Paris	10th	Anne-Christine Lang	Ensemble	Rodrigo Arenas	NUPES	19,808	54.43%	11,030	29.31%	16,039	42.63%	2,075	5.51%	1,927	5.12%		
Paris	11th	Maud Gatel	Ensemble	Maud Gatel	Ensemble	23,407	55.45%	16,153	37.30%	16,274	37.57%	1,520	3.51%	5,283	12.20%		
Paris	12th	Marie Silin*	Ensemble	Olivia Grégoire	Ensemble	26,908	68.51%	17,380	39.51%	9,829	22.34%	1,804	4.10%	7,724	17.56%		
Paris	13th	Hugues Renson*	Ensemble	David Amiel	Ensemble	23,982	59.86%	16,267	38.07%	13,053	30.55%	2,119	4.96%	5,990	14.02%		
Paris	14th	Sandra Boëlle*	UDC	Benjamin Haddad	Ensemble	19,742	53.23%	15,964	39.27%	4,654	11.45%	1,435	3.53%	13,527	33.28%		
Paris	15th	Vacant seat		Danielle Simonnet	NUPES	20,897	58.45%	6,616	15.83%	19,772	47.31%	1,597	3.82%	2,517	6.02%	Lamia El Aaraje (PS dissident) with 7,469 votes (17.87%)	
Paris	16th	Mounir Mahjoubi*	Ensemble	Sarah Legrain	NUPES	20,829	56.5%	7,534	20.44%	20,829	56.51%	1,454	3.94%	2,153	5.84%		
Paris	17th	Danièle Obono	NUPES	Danièle Obono	NUPES	16,161	57.07%	5,638	19.91%	16,161	57.07%	1,241	4.38%	1,111	3.92%		
Paris	18th	Pierre-Yves Bournazel	Ensemble	Aymeric Caron	NUPES	19,914	51.65%	13,922	35.57%	17,632	45.05%	1,318	3.37%	1,398	3.57%		
Seine-Maritime	1st	Damien Adam	Ensemble	Damien Adam	Ensemble	15,823	50.12%	9,424	28.20%	11,045	33.05%	3,094	9.26%	2,886	8.63%	Christine de Cintré (PS dissident) with 3,718 votes (17.87%)	
Seine-Maritime	2nd	Annie Vidal	Ensemble	Annie Vidal	Ensemble	26,856	59.64%	16,332	32.53%	11,113	22.13%	9,733	19.39%	6,591	13.13%		
Seine-Maritime	3rd	Hubert Wulfranc	NUPES	Hubert Wulfranc	NUPES	18,868	70.36%	5,026	16.41%	13,544	44.21%	5,251	17.14%	–	–	Kader Chekhemani (PS dissident) with 3,374 votes (11.01%)	
Seine-Maritime	4th	Sira Sylla	Ensemble	Alma Dufour	NUPES	17,764	53.72%	7,004	17.99%	9,303	23.90%	10,105	25.96%	–	–	Djoudé Merabet (PS dissident) with 9,136 votes (23.47%)	
Seine-Maritime	5th	Gérard Leseul	NUPES	Gerard Leseul	NUPES	22,874	55.81%	11,835	25.81%	15,440	33.67%	12,867	28.06%	2,266	4.94%		
Seine-Maritime	6th	Sébastien Jumel	NUPES	Sébastien Jumel	NUPES	27,801	57.81%	11,010	19.94%	20,800	37.66%	15,325	27.75%	3,395	6.15%		
Seine-Maritime	7th	Agnès Firmin-Le Bodo	Ensemble	Agnès Firmin-Le Bodo	Ensemble	21,578	57.87%	15,505	39.13%	10,304	26.00%	6,064	15.30%	1,648	4.16%		
Seine-Maritime	8th	Jean-Paul Lecoq	NUPES	Jean-Paul Lecoq	NUPES	15,117	65.76%	6,120	24.40%	12,227	48.75%	4,636	18.48%	–	–		
Seine-Maritime	9th	Stéphanie Kerbarh	PRG	Marie-Agnès Poussier-Winsback	Ensemble	21,352	50.84%	13,184	28.37%	9,449	20.33%	13,591	29.25%	2,176	4.68%		
Seine-Maritime	10th	Xavier Batut	Ensemble	Xavier Batut	Ensemble	25,900	51.05%	17,046	30.58%	11,710	21.01%	16,399	29.42%	–	–		
Seine-et-Marne	1st	Aude Luquet	Ensemble	Aude Luquet	Ensemble	14,994	53.06%	8,292	27.24%	8,427	27.68%	5,792	19.03%	3,487	11.45%		
Seine-et-Marne	2nd	Sylvie Bouchet Bellecourt*	UDC	Frédéric Valletoux	Ensemble	20,037	57.42%	10,981	27.76%	9,107	23.02%	7,345	18.57%	5,754	14.54%		
Seine-et-Marne	3rd	Jean-Louis Thiériot	UDC	Jean-Louis Thiériot	UDC	18,422	56.69%	5,290	15.03%	8,895	25.27%	7,988	22.69%	8,409	23.89%		
Seine-et-Marne	4th	Christian Jacob*	UDC	Isabelle Périgault	UDC	18,866	51.16%	6,953	16.77%	8,394	20.24%	12,742	30.73%	9,007	21.72%		
Seine-et-Marne	5th	Patricia Lemoine	Ensemble	Franck Riester	Ensemble	17,949	53.21%	11,225	29.27%	8,889	23.18%	9,745	25.41%	2,767	7.22%		
Seine-et-Marne	6th	Bernadette Beauvais*	UDC	Béatrice Roullaud	RN	15,399	52.12%	5,976	17.82%	8,986	26.80%	9,044	26.97%	4,943	14.74%		
Seine-et-Marne	7th	Rodrigue Kokouendo	Ensemble	Ersilia Soudais	NUPES	16,732	51.31%	8,823	24.02%	11,344	30.89%	8,923	24.30%	3,509	9.55%		
Seine-et-Marne	8th	Jean-Michel Fauvergue*	Ensemble	Hadrien Ghomi	Ensemble	19,323	50.01%	12,301	30.61%	13,044	32.46%	6,610	16.45%	3,287	8.18%		
Seine-et-Marne	9th	Michèle Peyron	Ensemble	Michèle Peyron	Ensemble	17,454	52.63%	9,112	24.94%	9,919	27.15%	8,004	21.91%	4,259	11.66%		
Seine-et-Marne	10th	Stéphanie Do	Ensemble	Maxime Laisney	NUPES	17,724	54.36%	8,612	25.51%	12,544	37.15%	4,412	13.07%	3,882	11.50%		
Seine-et-Marne	11th	Olivier Faure	NUPES	Olivier Faure	NUPES	15,453	64.45%	5,768	22.03%	12,279	46.90%	4,589	17.53%	1,256	4.80%		
Yvelines	1st	Didier Baichère	Ensemble	Didier Baichère	Ensemble	25,707	63.31%	15,198	33.08%	11,253	24.49%	3,332	7.25%	7,292	15.87%	Laurence Trochu (Reconquête) with 5,730 votes (12.47%)	
Yvelines	2nd	Jean-Noël Barrot	Ensemble	Jean-Noël Barrot	Ensemble	28,559	64.27%	17,391	34.88%	11,296	22.66%	4,215	8.45%	7,262	14.57%		
Yvelines	3rd	Béatrice Piron	Ensemble	Béatrice Piron	Ensemble	28,327	71.40%	18,012	39.73%	8,029	17.71%	4,050	8.93%	6,678	14.73%	Jean-François Cuignet (Reconquête) with 4,698 votes (10.36%)	
Yvelines	4th	Marie Lebec	Ensemble	Marie Lebec	Ensemble	25,888	65.69%	18,308	42.34%	10,780	24.93%	3,739	8.65%	5,523	12.77%		
Yvelines	5th	Yaël Braun-Pivet	Ensemble	Yaël Braun-Pivet	Ensemble	23,336	64.62%	14,483	36.59%	9,322	23.55%	3,079	7.78%	7,086	17.90%		
Yvelines	6th	Natalia Pouzyreff	Ensemble	Natalia Pouzyreff	Ensemble	22,244	64.52%	14,378	37.78%	9,323	24.50%	2,993	7.86%	6,747	17.73%		
Yvelines	7th	Michèle de Vaucouleurs*	Ensemble	Nadia Hai	Ensemble	19,889	55.78%	11,401	29.55%	10,488	27.19%	5,195	13.47%	5,723	14.84%		
Yvelines	8th	Michel Vialay	UDC	Benjamin Lucas	NUPES	15,849	56.41%	7,336	24.35%	10,054	33.37%	6,729	22.33%	2,365	7.85%		
Yvelines	9th	Bruno Millienne	Ensemble	Bruno Millienne	Ensemble	21,452	57.85%	11,275	26.34%	9,525	22.25%	9,613	22.45%	4,376	10.22%		
Yvelines	10th	Aurore Bergé	Ensemble	Aurore Bergé	Ensemble	28,169	63.27%	16,727	33.43%	11,030	22.04%	6,482	12.95%	8,571	17.13%		
Yvelines	11th	Philippe Benassaya	UDC	William Martinet	NUPES	15,760	50.18%	8,289	25.09%	10,888	32.96%	3,500	10.60%	5,913	17.90%		
Yvelines	12th	Florence Granjus*	Ensemble	Karl Olive	Ensemble	20,069	59.94%	14,028	38.85%	8,704	24.10%	4,393	12.16%	2,700	7.48%		
Deux-Sèvres	1st	Guillaume Chiche	DVG	Bastien Marchive	Ensemble	22,511	51.99%	13,741	30.20%	12,938	28.43%	5,869	12.90%	1,704	3.74%	Guillaume Chiche (miscellaneous left) with 7,884 votes (17.33%)	
Deux-Sèvres	2nd	Delphine Batho	NUPES	Delphine Batho	NUPES	25,011	57.88%	12,049	25.08%	17,477	36.38%	9,328	19.42%	3,048	6.34%		
Deux-Sèvres	3rd	Jean-Marie Fiévet	Ensemble	Jean-Marie Fiévet	Ensemble	20,675	58.27%	13,507	34.27%	8,816	22.37%	7,689	19.51%	6,139	15.58%		
Somme	1st	François Ruffin	NUPES	François Ruffin	NUPES	19,731	61.01%	7,640	20.31%	15,081	40.09%	8,495	22.58%	2,636	7.01%		
Somme	2nd	Cécile Delpirou*	Ensemble	Barbara Pompili	Ensemble	18,162	53.13%	10,895	29.84%	10,946	29.98%	5,780	15.83%	3,217	8.81%		
Somme	3rd	Emmanuel Maquet	UDC	Emmanuel Maquet	UDC	21,266	53.81%	7,490	17.70%	7,058	16.68%	13,091	30.94%	11,240	26.57%		
Somme	4th	Jean-Claude Leclabart	Ensemble	Jean-Philippe Tanguy	RN	21,136	54.59%	10,497	25.10%	8,081	19.32%	13,575	32.45%	6,066	14.50%		
Somme	5th	Grégory Labille	UDC	Yaël Ménache	RN	20,859	60.79%	7,806	19.94%	7,941	20.29%	13,501	34.49%	6,607	16.88%		
Tarn	1st	Muriel Roques-Étienne	Ensemble	Frédéric Cabrolier	RN	19,125	53.09%	8,600	19.29%	9,529	21.37%	8,999	20.18%	1,856	4.16%		
Tarn	2nd	Marie-Christine Verdier-Jouclas	Ensemble	Karen Erodi	NUPES	22,633	37.50%	16,487	28.34%	17,400	29.91%	13,775†	23.68%	–	–		
Tarn	3rd	Jean Terlier	Ensemble	Jean Terlier	Ensemble	25,496	53.71%	12,281	22.22%	12,308	22.27%	12,267	22.20%	8,996	16.28%		
Tarn-et-Garonne	1st	Valérie Rabault	NUPES	Valérie Rabault	NUPES	25,327	58.29%	8,196	17.33%	15,763	33.33%	10,610	22.44%	4,378	9.26%		
Tarn-et-Garonne	2nd	Sylvia Pinel	PRG	Marine Hamelet	RN	23,678	54.99%	10,083	20.58%	9,272	18.93%	15,187	31.00%	–	–	Sylvia Pinel (PRG) with 9,892 votes (20.19%)	
Var	1st	Geneviève Levy*	Ensemble	Yannick Chenevard	Ensemble	15,649	53.49%	10,222	31.00%	6,477	19.65%	8,097	24.56%	2,190	6.64%	Philippe Heno (Reconquête) with 3,464 votes (10.51%)	
Var	2nd	Cécile Muschotti*	Ensemble	Laure Lavalette	RN	19,756	51.64%	11,203	27.45%	7,311	17.91%	12,595	30.86%	2,566	6.29%		
Var	3rd	Édith Audibert*	UDC	Stéphane Rambaud	RN	23,307	50.42%	13,877	27.78%	8,127	16.27%	13,503	27.03%	5,503	11.02%		
Var	4th	Sereine Mauborgne	Ensemble	Philippe Lottiaux	RN	25,581	53.65%	14,735	28.51%	6,649	12.87%	12,784	24.74%	2,454	4.75%	Eric Zemmour (Reconquête) with 11,983 votes (23.19%)	
Var	5th	Philippe Michel-Kleisbauer	Ensemble	Julie Lechanteux	RN	24,342	55.98%	12,355	27.28%	5,477	12.09%	16,350	36.10%	2,894	6.39%	Baptiste Laroche (Reconquête) with 4,868 votes (10.75%)	
Var	6th	Valérie Gomez-Bassac	Ensemble	Frank Giletti	RN	30,241	56.63%	13,988	24.20%	10,289	17.80%	19,832	34.31%	3,619	6.26%		
Var	7th	Émilie Guerel	Ensemble	Frédéric Boccaletti	RN	22,311	52.05%	12,226	26.62%	6,830	14.87%	13,185	28.70%	5,145	11.20%		
Var	8th	Fabien Matras	Ensemble	Philippe Schreck	RN	25,576	54.93%	12,876	25.51%	9,484	18.79%	15,474	30.66%	2,735	5.42%		
Vaucluse	1st	Souad Zitouni	Ensemble	Joris Hébrard	RN	14,721	51.14%	6985	22.85%	9,338	30.55%	9,160	29.97%	1,359	4.45%		
Vaucluse	2nd	Jean-Claude Bouchet*	UDC	Bénédicte Auzanot	RN	19,210	52.18%	9,432	23.07%	8,804	21.53%	10,662	26.08%	4,097	10.02%	Stanislas Rigault (Reconquête) with 4,308 votes (10.54%)	
Vaucluse	3rd	Adrien Morenas	Ensemble	Hervé de Lépinau	RN	19,604	58.82%	7,985	22.02%	6,947	19.16%	13,430	37.03%	2,418	6.67%		
Vaucluse	4th	Marie-France Lorho	RN	Marie-France Lorho	RN	21,878	56.96%	10,381	25.27%	7,453	18.14%	16,850	41.01%	3,152	7.67%		
Vaucluse	5th	Julien Aubert	UDC	Jean-François Lovisolo	Ensemble	18,564	50.79%	10,224	24.97%	9,134	22.26%	9,635	23.48%	7,044	17.17%		
Vendée	1st	Philippe Latombe	Ensemble	Philippe Latombe	Ensemble	27,885	56.73%	16,624	30.65%	13,106	24.16%	8,791	16.21%	9,191	16.95%		
Vendée	2nd	Patrick Loiseau	Ensemble	Béatrice Bellamy	Ensemble	28,722	58.42%	14,334	25.97%	12,053	21.84%	9,665	17.51%	9,572	17.34%		
Vendée	3rd	Stéphane Buchou	Ensemble	Stéphane Buchou	Ensemble	36,145	61.48%	23,870	36.07%	11,546	17.45%	14,154	21.39%	10,475	15.83%		
Vendée	4th	Martine Leguille-Balloy	Ensemble	Véronique Besse	DVD	23,336	59.69%	10,531	21.78%	8,498	17.58%	5,218	10.79%			Véronique Besse (miscellaneous right) with 16,904 votes (34.97%)	
Vendée	5th	Pierre Henriet	Ensemble	Pierre Henriet	Ensemble	22,296	60.94%	15,353	37.39%	8,261	20.12%	8,618	20.99%	4,385	10.68%		
Vienne	1st	Françoise Ballet-Blu	Ensemble	Lisa Belluco	NUPES	18,918	51.36%	11,226	28.17%	12,972	32.56%	6,254	15.70%	5,324	13.36%		
Vienne	2nd	Sacha Houlié	Ensemble	Sacha Houlié	Ensemble	20,267	51.19%	15,416	36.83%	14,394	34.39%	5,641	13.48%	–	–		
Vienne	3rd	Jean-Michel Clément	PP	Pascal Lecamp	Ensemble	17,496	54.14%	7,637	20.72%	7,585	20.65%	7,697	20.91%	2,362	6.42%	Jean-Michel Clément (Place Publique) with 4,407 votes (11.98%)	
Vienne	4th	Nicolas Turquois	Ensemble	Nicolas Turquois	Ensemble	16,938	54.58%	12,917	37.62%	7,937	23.11%	9,739	28.36%	–	–		
Haute-Vienne	1st	Sophie Beaudouin-Hubière	Ensemble	Damien Maudet	NUPES	20,710	53.41	11,907	28.02%	14,675	34.54%	7,884	18.55%	3,756	8.84%		
Haute-Vienne	2nd	Pierre Venteau*	Ensemble	Stéphane Delautrette	NUPES	26,730	61.47%	7,957	15.40%	18,381	35.58%	10,244	19.83%	3,962	7.67%	Jean-Luc Bonnet, LREM dissident) with 6,080 votes (11.77%)	
Haute-Vienne	3rd	Marie-Ange Magne*	Ensemble	Manon Meunier	NUPES	19,551	52.10%	8,384	20.31%	13,079	31.68%	8,117	19.68%	4,177	10.12%		
Vosges	1st	Stéphane Viry	UDC	Stéphane Viry	UDC	21,445	67.23%	5,439	15.24%	6,643	18.62%	7,316	20.50%	13,276	37.21%		
Vosges	2nd	Gérard Cherpion*	UDC	David Valence	Ensemble	15,823	50.55%	10,235	30.12%	6,061	17.84%	9,762	28.73%	4,024	11.84%		
Vosges	3rd	Christophe Naegelen	UDC	Christophe Naegelen	UDC	21,035	74.27%	3,758	11.72%	5,669	17.68%	5,805	18.10%	15,136	47.21%		
Vosges	4th	Jean-Jacques Gaultier	UDC	Jean-Jacques Gaultier	UDC	15,441	51.91%	4,490	13.74%	5,220	15.97%	8,530	26.10%	7,028	21.50%	Christian Franqueville (PS dissident) with 4,049 votes (12.39%)	
Yonne	1st	Guillaume Larrivé	UDC	Daniel Grenon	RN	16,864	51.10%	7,509	19.50%	9,339	24.25%	9,214	23.92%	8,709	22.61%		
Yonne	2nd	André Villiers	Ensemble	André Villiers	Ensemble	16,760	51.34%	10,402	29.22%	7,589	21.32%	10,936	30.72%	–	–		
Yonne	3rd	Michèle Crouzet	Ensemble	Julien Odoul	RN	21,429	55.84%	9,114	21.52%	8,126	19.18%	14,897	35.17%	4,588	10.83%		
Territoire de Belfort	1st	Ian Boucard	UDC	Ian Boucard	UDC	12,037	61.61%	4,671	20.55%	4,828	21.24%	4,868	21.42%	6,196	27.26%		
Territoire de Belfort	2nd	Michel Zumkeller	UDC	Florian Chauche	NUPES	9,476	51.37%	4,134	18.38%	5,943	26.42%	4,307	19.15%	3,669	16.31%	Didier Vallverdu (LR dissident) with 2,502 votes (11.12%)	
Essonne	1st	Francis Chouat*	Ensemble	Farida Amrani	NUPES	15,471	59.83%	6,139	22.54%	10,657	39.12%	3,990	14.65%	2,701	9.91%		
Essonne	2nd	Bernard Bouley*	UDC	Nathalie da Conceicao Carvalho	RN	19,607	53.27%	8,848	20.61%	10,588	24.66%	9,839	22.91%	6,276	14.62%		
Essonne	3rd	Laëtitia Romeiro Dias*	Ensemble	Alexis Izard	Ensemble	22,706	51.18%	12,447	25.65%	13,941	25.65%	8,612	17.74%	5,112	10.53%		
Essonne	4th	Marie-Pierre Rixain	Ensemble	Marie-Pierre Rixain	Ensemble	24,962	55.65%	15,598	31.72%	13,517	27.49%	7,818	15.90%	5,044	10.26%		
Essonne	5th	Cédric Villani	NUPES	Paul Midy	Ensemble	18,687	50.02%	11,849	30.53%	14,830	38.20%	2,774	7.15%	6,222	16.03%		
Essonne	6th	Stéphanie Atger*	Ensemble	Jérôme Guedj	NUPES	21,213	53.7%	12,915	31.46%	15,730	38.31%	4,361	10.62%	2,448	5.96%		
Essonne	7th	Robin Reda	Ensemble	Robin Reda	Ensemble	15,935	50.34%	10,309	31.96%	11,299	35.03%	4,537	14.07%	2,038	6.32%		
Essonne	8th	Nicolas Dupont-Aignan	DLF	Nicolas Dupont-Aignan	DLF	19,306	57.26%	7,929	22.39%	10,799	30.50%	–	–	3,551	10.03%	Nicolas Dupont-Aignan (Debout la France) with 11,804 votes (33.34%)	
Essonne	9th	Marie Guévenoux	Ensemble	Marie Guévenoux	Ensemble	17,005	51.27%	10,520	29.79%	11,454	32.44%	5,602	15.86%	3,303	9.35%		
Essonne	10th	Pierre-Alain Raphan	Ensemble	Antoine Léaument	NUPES	13,321	55.21%	6,779	26.21%	9,640	37.27%	3,994	15.44%	2,068	8.00%		
Hauts-de-Seine	1st	Elsa Faucillon	NUPES	Elsa Faucillon	NUPES	16,934	70.17%	4,913	20.17%	13,218	54.26%	2,128	8.74%	1,147	4.71%		
Hauts-de-Seine	2nd	Bénédicte Pételle*	Ensemble	Francesca Pasquini	NUPES	13,995	35.55%	10,227	26.79%	10,465	27.41%	1,660	4.35%	9,541†	24.99%		
Hauts-de-Seine	3rd	Christine Hennion*	Ensemble	Philippe Juvin	UDC	17,083	38.00%	14,515	32.40%	10,348†	23.10%	2,348	5.24%	13,949	31.14%		
Hauts-de-Seine	4th	Isabelle Florennes	Ensemble	Sabrina Sebaihi	NUPES	18,520	51.00%	13,472	36.96%	13,122	36.00%	3,337	9.16%	–	–		
Hauts-de-Seine	5th	Céline Calvez	Ensemble	Céline Calvez	Ensemble	21,584	59.73%	12,877	34.53%	10,732	28.78%	2,029	5.44%	4,236	11.36%		
Hauts-de-Seine	6th	Constance Le Grip	Ensemble	Constance Le Grip	Ensemble	27,688	74.19%	14,943	36.01%	6,420	15.47%	3,056	7.36%	5,517	13.30%		
Hauts-de-Seine	7th	Jacques Marilossian*	Ensemble	Pierre Cazeneuve	Ensemble	30,710	72.06%	20,120	41.91%	8,842	18.42%	3,054	6.36%	8,694	18.11%		
Hauts-de-Seine	8th	Jacques Maire*	Ensemble	Prisca Thévenot	Ensemble	23,431	65.75%	15,547	40.12%	9,398	24.25%	2,082	5.37%	6,073	15.67%		
Hauts-de-Seine	9th	Thierry Solère*	Ensemble	Emmanuel Pellerin	Ensemble	15,838	53.91%	10,307	29.30%	6,200	17.63%	1,507	4.28%	7,672	21.81%	Antoine De Jerphanion (miscellaneous right) with 5,349 votes (15.21%)	
Hauts-de-Seine	10th	Florence Provendier*	Ensemble	Gabriel Attal	Ensemble	24,047	59.85%	20,679	48.06%	13,233	30.75%	2,992	6.95%	–	–		
Hauts-de-Seine	11th	Laurianne Rossi	Ensemble	Aurélien Saintoul	NUPES	19,583	54.76%	13,132	36.11%	16,359	44.98%	2,817	7.75%	–	–		
Hauts-de-Seine	12th	Jean-Louis Bourlanges	Ensemble	Jean-Louis Bourlanges	Ensemble	27,386	57.53%	15,423	30.80%	14,883	29.72%	3,927	7.84%	6,558	13.10%		
Hauts-de-Seine	13th	Frédérique Dumas*	NUPES	Maud Bregeon	Ensemble	27,864	59.11%	16,441	32.84%	13,976	27.91%	2,929	5.85%	8,259	16.49%		
Seine-Saint-Denis	1st	Éric Coquerel	NUPES	Éric Coquerel	NUPES	17,456	71.68%	4,780	18.89%	13,608	53.79%	1,829	7.23%	616	2.43%		
Seine-Saint-Denis	2nd	Stéphane Peu	NUPES	Stéphane Peu	NUPES	13,180	78.70%	1,595	9.05%	11,083	62.85%	1,480	8.39%	622	3.53%		
Seine-Saint-Denis	3rd	Patrice Anato	Ensemble	Thomas Portes	NUPES	17,085	53.96%	8,399	25.49%	11,223	34.06%	3,840	11.65%	2,777	8.43%		
Seine-Saint-Denis	4th	Marie-George Buffet*	NUPES	Soumya Bourouaha	NUPES	12,832	100.00%	2,007	9.88%	7,341	36.13%	2,290	11.27%	975	4.80%	Azzédine Taïbi (PCF dissident) with 4,355 votes (21.43%)	
Seine-Saint-Denis	5th	Jean-Christophe Lagarde	UDC	Raquel Garrido	NUPES	13,107	53.49%	1,854	8.00%	8,786	37.90%	2,235	9.64%	7,745	33.41%		
Seine-Saint-Denis	6th	Bastien Lachaud	NUPES	Bastien Lachaud	NUPES	16,046	75.40%	3,419	15.12%	12,797	56.61%	1,584	7.01%	1,172	5.18%		
Seine-Saint-Denis	7th	Alexis Corbière	NUPES	Alexis Corbière	NUPES	22,718	62.94%	5,773	15.99%	22,718	62.94%	1,735	4.81%	799	2.21%		
Seine-Saint-Denis	8th	Sylvie Charrière	Ensemble	Fatiha Keloua Hachi	NUPES	13,169	53.57%	5,696	21.71%	9,263	35.31%	3,610	13.76%	3,647	13.90%		
Seine-Saint-Denis	9th	Sabine Rubin*	NUPES	Aurélie Trouvé	NUPES	20,285	69.24%	6,214	20.29%	16,393	53.53%	2,491	8.13%	1,049	3.43%		
Seine-Saint-Denis	10th	Alain Ramadier	UDC	Nadège Abomangoli	NUPES	14,228	55.53%	2,593	10.49%	9,812	39.71%	2,951	11.94%	4,959	20.07%		
Seine-Saint-Denis	11th	Clémentine Autain	NUPES	Clémentine Autain	NUPES	11,296	100.00%	2,181	10.71%	9,400	46.15%	2,672	13.12%	269	1.32%	Virginie de Carvalho (PCF dissident) with 3,091 votes (15.18%)	
Seine-Saint-Denis	12th	Stéphane Testé	Ensemble	Jérôme Legavre	NUPES	11,677	51.11%	5,793	23.86%	7,485	30.83%	3,743	15.42%	3,512	14.47%		
Val-de-Marne	1st	Frédéric Descrozaille	Ensemble	Frédéric Descrozaille	Ensemble	23,949	59.09%	12,291	28.74%	11,908	27.84%	3,835	8.97%	8,183	19.13%		
Val-de-Marne	2nd	Jean François Mbaye	Ensemble	Clémence Guetté	NUPES	16,523	64.20%	6,024	22.98%	12440	47.46%	2,792	10.65%	1,713	6.53%		
Val-de-Marne	3rd	Laurent Saint-Martin	Ensemble	Louis Boyard	NUPES	15,087	51.98%	7,804	25.52%	9,655	31.57%	4,221	13.80%	4,801	15.70%		
Val-de-Marne	4th	Maud Petit	Ensemble	Maud Petit	Ensemble	18,050	55.98%	10,085	29.21%	10,238	29.65%	4,679	13.55%	5,760	16.68%		
Val-de-Marne	5th	Gilles Carrez*	UDC	Mathieu Lefevre	Ensemble	23,010	56.47%	12,544	29.45%	13,452	31.58%	3,537	8.30%	8,564	20.11%		
Val-de-Marne	6th	Guillaume Gouffier-Cha	Ensemble	Guillaume Gouffier-Cha	Ensemble	23,416	54.36%	16,126	36.40%	16,061	36.26%	2,432	5.49%	2,791	6.30%		
Val-de-Marne	7th	Jean-Jacques Bridey*	Ensemble	Rachel Kéké	NUPES	14,663	50.30%	7,153	23.77%	1,1200	37.22%	2,856	9.49%	5,514	18.32%		
Val-de-Marne	8th	Michel Herbillon	UDC	Michel Herbillon	UDC	25,641	63.27%	7,964	18.93%	11,847	28.16%	2,240	5.32%	15,767	37.48%		
Val-de-Marne	9th	Isabelle Santiago	NUPES	Isabelle Santiago	NUPES	13,771	67.25%	4,453	20.25%	10,612	48.27%	2,297	10.45%	927	4.22%		
Val-de-Marne	10th	Mathilde Panot	NUPES	Mathilde Panot	NUPES	18,739	67.63%	6,113	20.79%	16,122	54.84%	2,817	9.58%	1,407	4.79%		
Val-de-Marne	11th	Albane Gaillot*	NUPES	Sophie Taillé-Polian	NUPES	17,977	63.32%	7,663	25.39%	14,739	48.83%	2,514	8.33%	1,142	3.78%		
Val-d'Oise	1st	Antoine Savignat	UDC	Émilie Chandler	Ensemble	18,777	52.53%	9,472	23.78%	11,230	28.20%	8,377	21.03%	4,760	11.95%		
Val-d'Oise	2nd	Guillaume Vuilletet	Ensemble	Guillaume Vuilletet	Ensemble	17,462	53.25%	10,252	28.79%	9,652	27.10%	6,439	18.08%	3,092	8.68%		
Val-d'Oise	3rd	Cécile Rilhac	Ensemble	Cécile Rilhac	Ensemble	21,200	52.16%	12,284	28.37%	12,537	28.96%	6,989	16.14%	5,282	12.20%		
Val-d'Oise	4th	Naïma Moutchou	Ensemble	Naïma Moutchou	Ensemble	17,869	53.43%	10,397	29.03%	10,984	30.67%	4,659	13.01%	4,479	12.51%		
Val-d'Oise	5th	Fiona Lazaar	Ensemble	Paul Vannier	NUPES	15,645	63.71%	5,264	21.02%	11,218	44.80%	2,921	11.67%	2,447	9.77%		
Val-d'Oise	6th	Nathalie Élimas	Ensemble	Estelle Folest	Ensemble	17,245	53.47%	7,470	22.25%	10,019	29.84%	3,994	12.29%	4,125	11.90%		
Val-d'Oise	7th	Dominique Da Silva	Ensemble	Dominique Da Silva	Ensemble	13,936	50.37%	7,846	27.48%	9,018	31.59%	4,253	14.90%	2,193	7.68%		
Val-d'Oise	8th	François Pupponi	Ensemble	Carlos Martens Bilongo	NUPES	11,282	61.72%	4,263	24.42%	6,485	37.14%	1,998	11.44%	1,499	8.59%		
Val-d'Oise	9th	Zivka Park	Ensemble	Arnaud Le Gall	NUPES	13,432	56.42%	5,219	20.05%	7,583	29.13%	5,309	20.39%	3,335	12.81%		
Val-d'Oise	10th	Aurélien Taché	NUPES	Aurélien Taché	NUPES	14,636	55.76%	6,565	23.46%	9,193	32.85%	3,993	14.27%	1,656	5.92%		
=== French residents overseas ===
French residents overseas	1st	Roland Lescure	Ensemble	Roland Lescure	Ensemble	30,268	55.63%	18,236	35.88%	16,993	33.43%	1,013	1.99%	2,381	4.68%	Gérard Michon (UCE, LREM dissident) with 5,439 votes (10.70%)	
French residents overseas	2nd	Paula Forteza*	Ensemble	Éléonore Caroit	Ensemble	6,737	57.42%	3,836	34.57%	3,129	28.20%	240	2.16%	1,359	12.25%		
French residents overseas	3rd	Alexandre Holroyd	Ensemble	Alexandre Holroyd	Ensemble	24,749	55.80%	16,238	38.51%	13,265	31.46%	698	1.66%	2,302	5.46%		
French residents overseas	4th	Pieyre-Alexandre Anglade	Ensemble	Pieyre-Alexandre Anglade	Ensemble	25,694	55.15%	16,597	38.93%	13,842	32.47%	1,402	3.29%	2,510	5.89%		
French residents overseas	5th	Stéphane Vojetta	Ensemble	Stéphane Vojetta	Ensemble	14,836	57.26%	4,024	16.17%	6,942	27.89%	999	4.01%	1,775	7.13%	Stéphane Vojetta (LREM dissident) with 6,123 votes (24.60%)	
French residents overseas	6th	Joachim Son-Forget	DVD	Marc Ferracci	Ensemble	23,441	64.97%	12,233	36.49%	6,798	20.28%	1,297	3.87%	2,866	8.55%		
French residents overseas	7th	Frédéric Petit	Ensemble	Frédéric Petit	Ensemble	23,191	60.21%	12,409	34.58%	9,353	26.06%	4,60	1.28%	1,391	3.88%		
French residents overseas	8th	Meyer Habib	UDC	Meyer Habib	UDC	8,470	50.58%	4,402	27.78%	2,986	18.84%	296	1.87%	4,572	28.85%		
French residents overseas	9th	M'jid El Guerrab*	Ensemble	Karim Ben Cheïkh	NUPES	11,348	54.07%	4,845	28.06%	6,909	39.99%	257	1.49%	798	4.62%		
French residents overseas	10th	Amal Amélia Lakrafi	Ensemble	Amal Amélia Lakrafi	Ensemble	13,048	63.58%	6,558	32.75%	4,513	22.54%	420	2.10%	2,172	10.85%		
French residents overseas	11th	Anne Genetet	Ensemble	Anne Genetet	Ensemble	16,537	61.73%	10,539	38.14%	6,849	24.79%	742	2.69%	1,760	6.37%	Marc Guyon (Reconquête) with 2,786 votes (10.08%)	
Source: Ministry of the Interior * Outgoing deputy not seeking re-election ** Outgoing substitute, attached deputy seeking re-election *** Elected as a member of LREM in 2017 † Third-placed candidate advances to second round thanks to having received at least 12.5% of the vote of the whole electorate ‡ Candidate qualified for but withdrew from the second round

=== Overseas France ===
Results in Overseas France
Constituency		Elected deputy (2017)	Party	Elected deputy (2022)	Party
Guadeloupe	1st	Olivier Serva	NUPES	Olivier Serva	NUPES
Guadeloupe	2nd	Justine Bénin	Ensemble	Christian Baptiste	NUPES
Guadeloupe	3rd	Max Mathiasin	Ensemble	Max Mathiasin	Ensemble
Guadeloupe	4th	Hélène Vainqueur-Christophe*	NUPES	Élie Califer	NUPES
Martinique	1st	Josette Manin*	NUPES	Jiovanny William	NUPES
Martinique	2nd	Manuéla Kéclard-Mondésir*	NUPES	Marcellin Nadeau	NUPES
Martinique	3rd	Serge Letchimy*	NUPES	Johnny Hajjar	NUPES
Martinique	4th	Jean-Philippe Nilor	NUPES	Jean-Philippe Nilor	NUPES
French Guiana	1st	Gabriel Serville*	NUPES	Jean-Victor Castor	MDES
French Guiana	2nd	Lénaïck Adam	Ensemble	Davy Rimane	NUPES
Réunion	1st	Philippe Naillet	NUPES	Philippe Naillet	NUPES
Réunion	2nd	Karine Lebon	NUPES	Karine Lebon	NUPES
Réunion	3rd	Nathalie Bassire	UDC	Nathalie Bassire	UDC
Réunion	4th	David Lorion	UDC	Emeline K'Bidi	NUPES
Réunion	5th	Jean-Hugues Ratenon	NUPES	Jean-Hugues Ratenon	NUPES
Réunion	6th	Nadia Ramassamy	UDC	Frédéric Maillot	NUPES
Réunion	7th	Jean-Luc Poudroux*	UDC	Perceval Gaillard	NUPES
Mayotte	1st	Ramlati Ali	Ensemble	Estelle Youssouffa	DVD
Mayotte	2nd	Mansour Kamardine	UDC	Mansour Kamardine	UDC
New Caledonia	1st	Philippe Dunoyer	Ensemble	Philippe Dunoyer	Ensemble
New Caledonia	2nd	Philippe Gomès*	Ensemble	Nicolas Metzdorf	Ensemble
French Polynesia	1st	Maina Sage*	Ensemble	Tematai Le Gayic	NUPES
French Polynesia	2nd	Nicole Sanquer	A here ia	Steve Chailloux	NUPES
French Polynesia	3rd	Moetai Brotherson	NUPES	Moetai Brotherson	NUPES
Saint-Pierre-et-Miquelon	1st	Stéphane Claireaux*	Ensemble	Stéphane Lenormand	UDC
Wallis and Futuna	1st	Sylvain Brial*	UDC	Mikaele Seo	Ensemble
Saint-Martin/Saint-Barthélemy	1st	Claire Javois	UDC	Frantz Gumbs	Ensemble

== See also ==
- Candidates in the 2022 French legislative election
- Election results of Cabinet Ministers during the 2022 French legislative election
- List of MPs who lost their seat in the 2022 French legislative election
