= Abertzaleen Batasuna =

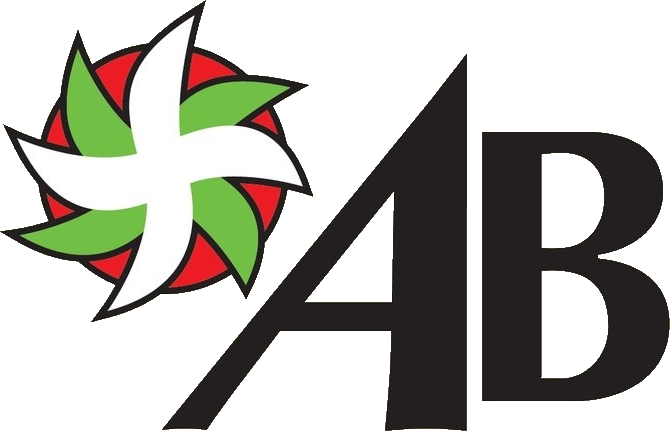
- Registered: 2001
- Ideology: Basque nationalism Left-wing nationalism Abertzale left Revolutionary socialism Anti-imperialism; Separatism

Website
- http://abertzaleen-batasuna.over-blog.com/

Abertzaleen Batasuna (AB; English: Patriot's Union or Unity) is a Basque political party in France.

== Ideology ==
It is the largest Basque nationalist party of the French Basque Country gathering around 10% of the votes in this territory. Its immediate goal is the establishment of a Pays Basque département out of Pyrénées-Atlantiques. In terms of ideology, besides Basque nationalism, it is a leftist political party.

== History ==
It was founded as an electoral platform and in 2001 it was redesigned as a political party. In 2001, members of AB who desired a stronger link to Southern Basques left to form the Northern branch of Batasuna, a different party with a similar ideology which is now illegal in Spain.

AB neither justifies nor condemns the violence of ETA, calling instead for a truce. ETA has scolded AB for this lack of support from what is seen as a friendly organization.

The opinion newspaper most related to AB is Enbata.

As of now, Abertzaleen Batasuna remains a left-wing party opposed to the armed strategy, with around a hundred elected representatives in the municipalities of the Northern Basque Country, including a dozen mayors and a general councillor (Alain Iriart, canton of Saint-Pierre-d'Irube). Its leaders also include Jakes Abeberry, Jakes Bortayrou and Txetx Etcheverry.

Starting with the legislative elections of June 2007, it ran in coalition with two other abetzal formations under the name "Euskal Herria Bai", (Abertzaleen Batasuna, Eusko Alkartasuna and Batasuna) and improved its results to around 9% of votes cast, with a marked increase on the Basque Coast.

In June 2009, Abertzaleen Batasuna actively supported the Europe Ecology list led by José Bové, which included an AB representative.

== See also ==
- Herritarren Zerrenda
- Iparretarrak
- List of political parties in France
