= Pyrénées-Atlantiques's 6th constituency =

Constituency of the National Assembly of France

6th constituency of the Pyrénées-Atlantiques
- inline Constituency of the National Assembly of France

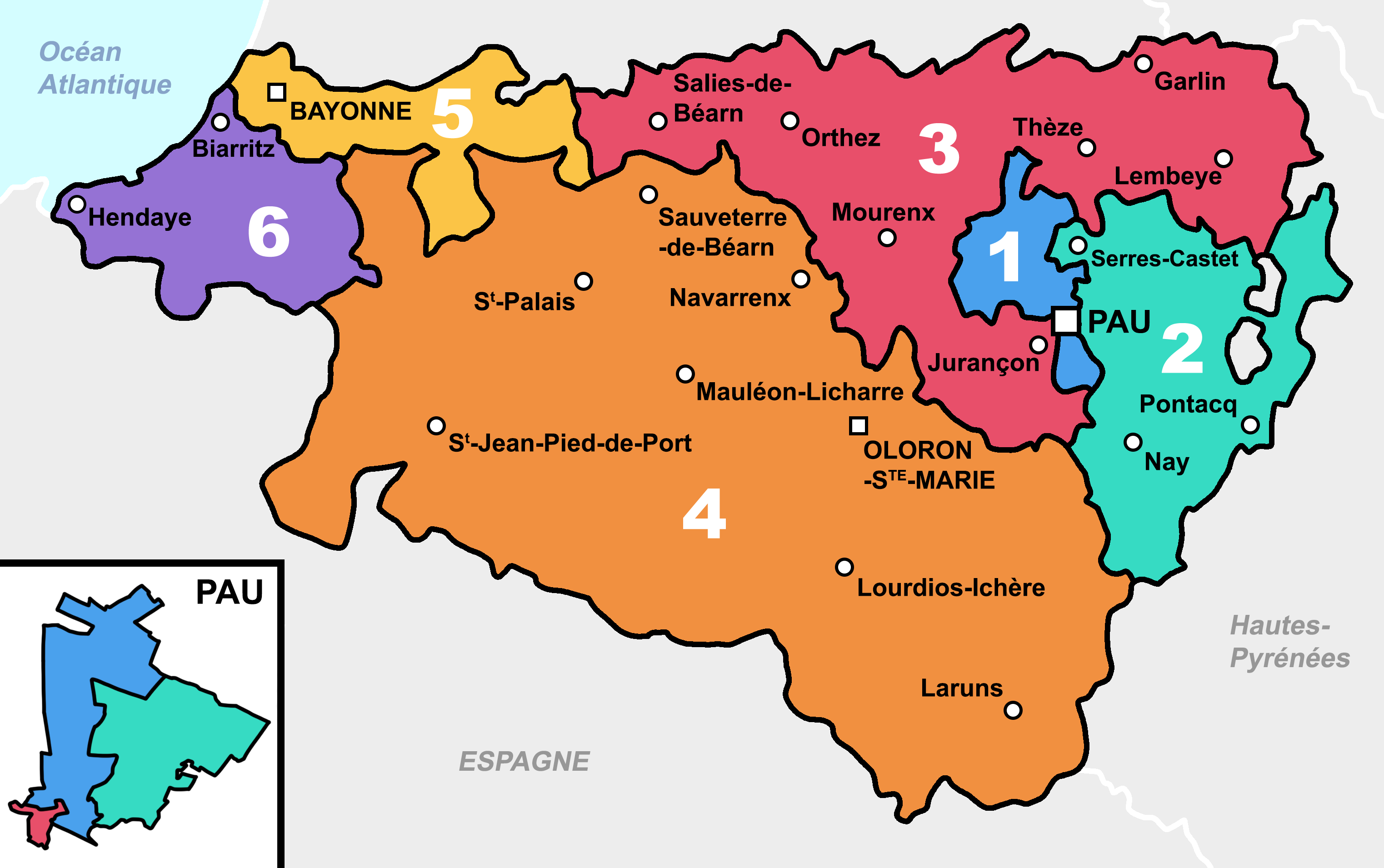
- The different constituencies of the Pyrénées-Atlantiques

- Pyrénées-Atlantiques in France
- Deputy: Peio Dufau; Euskal Herria Bai
- Department: Pyrénées-Atlantiques
- Cantons: (pre-2015) Biarritz-Est, Biarritz-Ouest, Espelette, Hendaye, Saint-Jean-de-Luz, Ustaritz
- Registered voters: 110900

The 6th constituency of the Pyrénées-Atlantiques (French: Sixième circonscription des Pyrénées-Atlantiques) is a French legislative constituency in the Pyrénées-Atlantiques département. Like the other 576 French constituencies, it elects one MP using the two-round system, with a run-off if no candidate receives over 50% of the vote in the first round.

== Description ==
The 6th constituency of the Pyrénées-Atlantiques lies in the south-west of the department and borders both the Atlantic Ocean and Spain. It sits within the French Basque Country. It includes the coastal resort of Biarritz, the border town of Hendaye, and Saint-Jean-de-Luz, which is famed for its beaches.

== History ==
The MP from 2017 to 2024 was Vincent Bru of the presidential majority.

== Assembly members ==
Election	Member	Party
1988	Michèle Alliot-Marie	RPR
1993	Daniel Poulou	UDF
1995	Michèle Alliot-Marie	RPR
1997	Michèle Alliot-Marie	RPR
2002	Michèle Alliot-Marie	UMP
2007	Michèle Alliot-Marie	UMP
2012	Sylviane Alaux	PS
2017	Vincent Bru	MoDem
2022	Vincent Bru	MoDem
2024	Peio Dufau	Euskal Herria Bai

== Election results ==
=== 2024 ===
Candidate	Party	Alliance	First round		Second round	
Candidate	Party	Alliance	Votes	%	Votes	%
Peio Dufau	EH Bai	NFP	21,650	29.42	27,117	36.28
Christian Devèze	MoDEM	Ensemble	19,806	26.92	26,403	35.33
Victor Lastécouères	LR	UXD	18,610	25.29	21,222	28.39
Emmanuelle Brisson		LR	8,546	11.61		
Jean Tellechea	Ind		3,712	5.04		
Frédéric Barrez	LO		844	1.15		
Eva Pernet	Ind	DVC	248	0.34		
Corinne Berthelot	Ind		161	0.22		
Michel Lamarque	Ind		1	0.00		
Valid votes			73,578	97.42	74,742	97.15
Blank votes			1,390	1.84	1,634	2.12
Null votes			562	0.74	556	0.72
Turnout			75,530	70.84	76,932	72.15
Abstentions			31,087	29.16	29,689	27.85
Registered voters			106,617		106,621	
Result			EH BAI GAIN OVER MoDEM			

=== 2022 ===
Legislative Election 2022: Pyrénées-Atlantiques's 6th constituency
Party	Candidate	Votes	%	±%
MoDem (Ensemble)	Vincent Bru	15,023	28.51	-10.43
LFI (NUPÉS)	Tom Dubois-Robin	10,302	19.55	-2.00
REG	Peio Dufau	7,667	14.55	N/A
RN	Monique Becker	5,209	9.89	+3.48
DVD	Bertrand Soubelet	3,088	5.86	N/A
LR (UDC)	Fabrice Sébastien Bach	2,618	4.97	−12.03
LREM	Philippe Jouvet*	2,579	4.89	N/A
REC	Christiane Neel	2,191	4.16	N/A
R!	Marielle Goitschel	1,681	3.19	N/A
DVE	Kevin Briolais	1,453	2.76	N/A
Others	N/A	884	1.68	
Turnout		52,695	50.92	−2.07
2nd round result
MoDem (Ensemble)	Vincent Bru	27,994	60.21	-2.30
LFI (NUPÉS)	Tom Dubois-Robin	18,497	39.79	N/A
Turnout		46,491	48.61	+5.49
MoDem hold				

* LREM dissident without the support of the Ensemble alliance.

=== 2017 ===
Results of the 11 June and 18 June 2017 French National Assembly election in Pyrénées-Atlantiques' 6th Constituency
Candidate	Party		1st round		2nd round	
Candidate	Party		Votes	%	Votes	%
Vincent Bru	Democratic Movement	MoDem	20,087	38.94	22,872	62.51
Maider Arosteguy	The Republicans	LR	7,882	15.28	13,715	37.49
Peio Etcheverry-Ainchart	Regionalist	REG	6,191	12.00		
Christine Labrousse	La France Insoumise	FI	4,804	9.31		
Sylviane Alaux	Socialist Party	PS	3,848	7.46		
Sylviane Lopez	National Front	FN	3,309	6.41		
Sophie Bussière	Ecologist	ECO	1,824	3.54		
Jean Tellechea	Regionalist	REG	1,161	2.25		
Stéphane Alvarez	Union of Democrats and Independents	UDI	886	1.72		
Dominique Mélé	Communist Party	PCF	638	1.24		
Thomas Burc	Independent	DIV	382	0.74		
Jacqueline Uhart	Far Left	EXG	328	0.64		
Gabriel Grosjean	Miscellaneous Right	DVD	244	0.47		
François Amigorena	Independent	DIV	3	0.01		
Total			51,587	100%	36,587	100%
Registered voters			99,403		99,395	
Blank/Void ballots			1,084	2.06%	6,282	14.63%
Turnout			52,671	52.99%	42,859	43.12%
Abstentions			46,732	47.01%	56,536	56.88%
Result					MoDEM GAIN FROM PS	

=== 2012 ===
Results of the 10 June and 17 June 2012 French National Assembly election in Pyrénées-Atlantiques' 6th Constituency
Candidate	Party		1st round		2nd round	
Candidate	Party		Votes	%	Votes	%
Michèle Alliot-Marie	Union for a Presidential Majority	UMP	19,517	35.37	25,908	48.38
Sylviane Alaux	Socialist Party	PS	17,412	31.55	27,648	51.62
Peio Etcheverry-Ainchart	Regionalist	REG	5,400	9.78		
Frank Jalleau-Longueville	National Front	FN	3,495	6.33		
Marie Contraires	Democratic Movement	MoDem	2,124	3.85		
Yvette Debarbieux	Left Front	FG	2,104	3.81		
Philippe Etcheverry	Europe Ecology - The Greens	EELV	1,793	3.25		
Jean Tellechea	Regionalist	REG	989	1.79		
Michel Lamarque	Other	AUT	980	1.78		
Jean-François Zunzarren	Miscellaneous Right	DVD	522	0.95		
Christophe Lepretre	Ecologist	ECO	356	0.65		
Sylvie Laplace	Far Left	EXG	297	0.54		
Michèle Noulibos	Far Left	EXG	173	0.31		
Sophie Hautenauve	Other	AUT	25	0.05		
Total			55,187	100%	53,556	100%
Registered voters			94,887		94,877	
Blank/Void ballots			797	0.84%	2,444	2.58%
Turnout			55,984	59.00%	56,000	59.02%
Abstentions			38,903	41.00%	38,877	40.98%
Result					PS GAIN FROM UMP	

=== 2007 ===
Results of the 10 June and 17 June 2007 French National Assembly election in Pyrénées-Atlantiques' 6th Constituency
Candidate	Party		1st round		2nd round	
Candidate	Party		Votes	%	Votes	%
Michèle Alliot-Marie	Union for a Presidential Majority	UMP	27,436	48.88	30,460	58.37
Sylviane Alaux	Socialist Party	PS	11,567	20.61	21,726	41.63
Roland Machenaud	UDF-Democratic Movement	UDF-MoDem	5,367	9.56		
Beñat Elizondo	Regionalist	REG	5,104	9.09		
Christine Labrousse	Far Left	EXG	1,172	2.09		
Henri Chevrat	National Front	FN	1,167	2.08		
Marie Felices	The Greens	LV	1,146	2.04		
Pierre Batby	Communist Party	PCF	1,123	2.00		
Michel Aguilera	Ecologist	ECO	714	1.27		
Pascale Pierret	Hunting, Fishing, Nature and Traditions	CPNT	704	1.25		
Jacqueline Desoutter	Independent	DIV	348	0.62		
Michèle Noulibos	Far Left	EXG	282	0.50		
Total			56,130	100%	52,186	100%
Registered voters			91,679		91,778	
Blank/Void ballots			738	1.30%	2,102	3.87%
Turnout			56,868	62.03%	54,288	59.15%
Abstentions			34,811	37.97%	37,490	40.85%
Result					UMP HOLD	

=== 2002 ===
Results of the 9 June and 16 June 2002 French National Assembly election in Pyrénées-Atlantiques' 6th Constituency
Candidate	Party		1st round		2nd round	
Candidate	Party		Votes	%	Votes	%
Michèle Alliot-Marie	Union for a Presidential Majority	UMP	25,940	49.00	29,409	60.89
Sylviane Alaux	Socialist Party	PS	12,096	22.85	18,890	39.11
Helyett Ginoux	National Front	FN	3,040	5.74		
J. Pierre Dirassar	Regionalist	REG	2,987	5.64		
Serge Lonca	The Greens	LV	2,223	4.20		
A. Marie Boudon	Communist Party	PCF	1,407	2.66		
Pascale Pierret	Hunting, Fishing, Nature and Traditions	CPNT	1,230	2.32		
Inaki Ibarloza	Regionalist	REG	981	1.85		
Didier Tastet	Far Right	EXD	861	1.63		
Daniel Couret	Revolutionary Communist League	LCR	697	1.32		
Michele Noublibos	Workers' Struggle	LO	444	0.84		
J. Max Caule	Movement for France	MPF	419	0.79		
Cecile Bremont	National Republican Movement	MNR	332	0.63		
Sebastien Larriviere	Independent	DIV	286	0.54		
Francois Belin	Regionalist	REG	0	0.00		
Total			52,943	100%	48,299	100%
Registered voters			85,397		85,398	
Blank/Void ballots			1,506	2.77%	2,617	5.14%
Turnout			54,449	63.76%	50,916	59.62%
Abstentions			30,948	36.24%	34,482	40.38%
Result					UMP GAIN FROM RPR	
