= Euskal Herria Bai =

Euskal Herria Bai Basque Country Yes
- Abbreviation: EH Bai
- General Secretary: Nikolas Blain
- Founded: 11 April 2007 (alliance); 26 November 2022 (as a party)
- Ideology: Basque independence Left-wing nationalism Abertzale left Socialism; Ecologism
- Political position: Left-wing to far-left
- National affiliation: Régions et Peuples Solidaires; New Popular Front (2024–present)
- Colors: Turquoise
- National Assembly (Pyrénées-Atlantiques seats): 1 / 6
- Departamental Council of Pyrénées-Atlantiques: 2 / 54

Website
- www.ehbai.eus

Euskal Herria Bai (transl. Basque Country Yes, EH Bai) is a Basque political party and former electoral alliance in France, founded in 2007 by Abertzaleen Batasuna, Eusko Alkartasuna and Batasuna. Batasuna was dissolved in 2013, and replaced by Sortu. It became a unified party in November 2022.

== History ==
The coalition first contested the 2007 legislative elections as a union of three parties: Abertzaleen Batasuna, Batasuna, and Eusko Alkartasuna. Although initial discussions included the possibility of the Basque Nationalist Party (EAJ) joining the coalition, EAJ ultimately decided to remain outside due to the resumption of ETA's armed campaign on 5 June 2007.

In 2011, the three parties forming the coalition called for an end to party divisions, as members of the Basque nationalist movement were demanding unity, aiming to become a single, strong movement. This push for unity was reflected in both the 2012 legislative elections and the 2014 municipal elections, serving as a sign of the organization's unification and an effort to concretely define the organization through a participatory process.

On 22 December 2014, EH Bai held its first General Assembly in Uztaritze. In March 2018, another General Assembly decided to change the leadership of EH Bai, signaling a shift in the political phase in response to ETA's cessation of armed struggle. Additionally, the assembly resolved that EH Bai would transition from being a coalition to becoming a unified movement, focusing on local groups rather than political parties.

=== 2024 legislative elections ===
For the 2024 French legislative elections, EH Bai joined the New People's Front (NPF) and participated in the elections as part of this alliance. In the Pyrénées-Atlantiques's 6th constituency (which includes the cities of Saint-Jean-de Luz, Biarritz and Hendaye) EH Bai member Peio Dufau was selected as the candidate for the NPF.

Dufau won the first round of the election with 29.4% of the votes, just ahead of the Ensemble and the extreme-right candidates, who also progressed to the second round. In the second round Dufau won 36.3% of the votes, edging out the Ensemble candidate for first place. Dufau is the first Basque nationalist elected to the National Assembly.

== Election results ==
=== National Assembly ===
National Assembly
Election	1st round		2nd round		Seats	+/–
Election	Votes	%	Votes	%	Seats	+/–
2007	10,781	6.73 (#4)	—N/a		0 / 577	0
2012	11,518	7.37 (#4)	—N/a		0 / 577	0
2017	12,778	8.82 (#4)	—N/a		0 / 577	0
2022	16,386	11.31 (#4)	—N/a		0 / 577	0
2024	21,650	29.41 (#1)	27,117	36.28 (#1)	1 / 577	1

=== Departmental Council of Pyrénées-Atlantiques ===
Departmental Council of Pyrénées-Atlantiques
Election	1st round		2nd round		Seats	+/–	Note
Election	Votes	%	Votes	%	Seats	+/–	Note
2008	12,302	13.75 (#3)	—N/a		0 / 24	0	
2011	16,233	12.84 (#3)	—N/a		0 / 24	0	
2015	17,779	16.09 (#3)	25,332	24.29	2 / 24	2	
2021	20,821	24.68 (#2)	23,505	27.47	2 / 24	0	

== See also ==
- Basque nationalism
- Abertzale left
- Iparralde
- Socialist Movement, also active in Iparralde
- List of political parties in France
