= Vincent Bru =

French politician (born 1955)

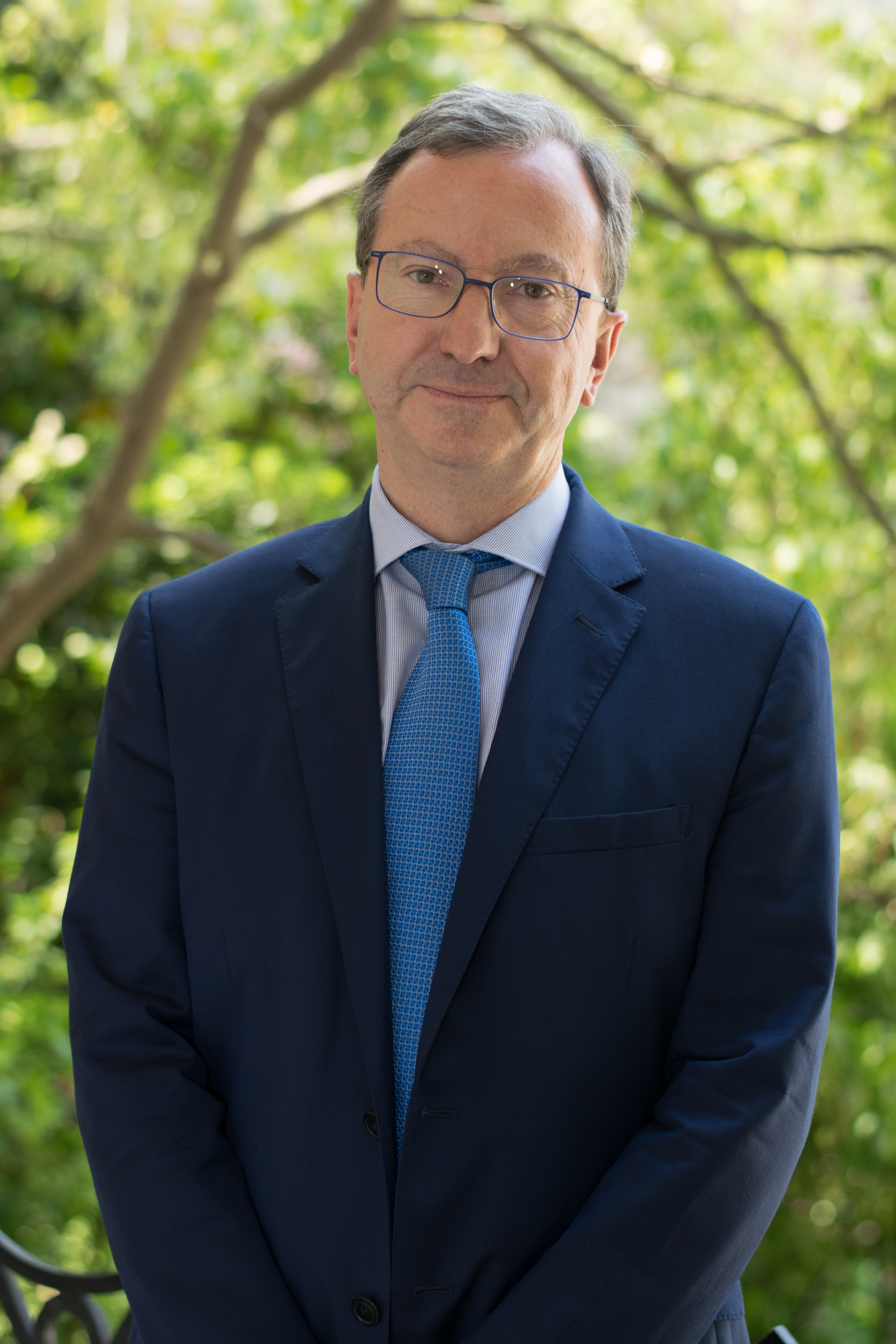
- Vincent Bru in 2017

Member of the National Assembly for Pyrénées-Atlantiques's 6th constituency
- Incumbent
- Assumed office 21 June 2017
- Preceded by: Sylviane Alaux

Personal details
- Born: 29 April 1955 (age 71) Bayonne, France
- Party: MoDem
- Education: University of Bordeaux

Vincent Bru (born 29 April 1955) is a French politician representing the Democratic Movement. He was elected to the French National Assembly on 18 June 2017, representing the 6th constituency of the department of Pyrénées-Atlantiques.
