= Peio Dufau =

French politician

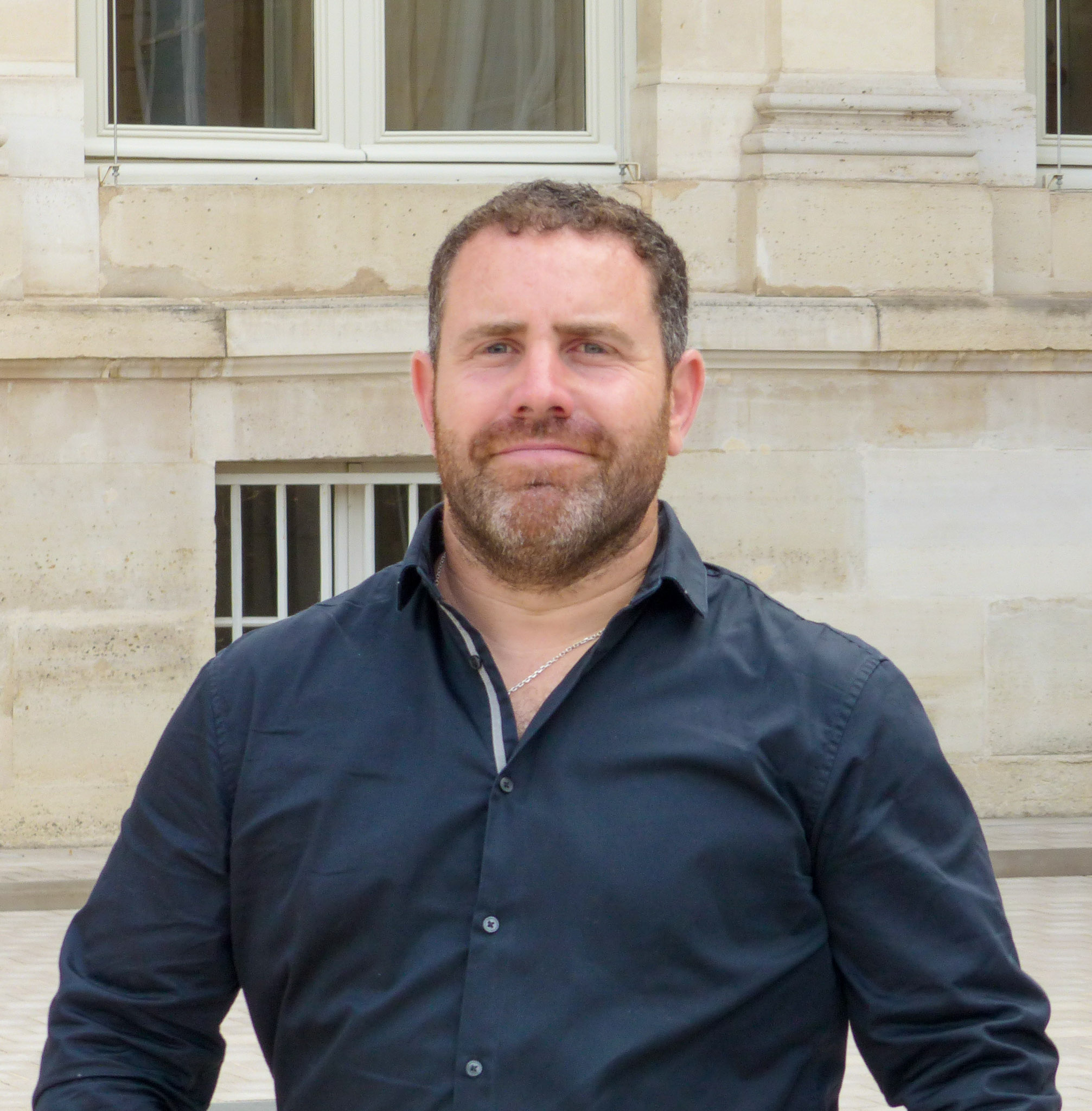
Peio Dufau

Peio Dufau is a member of the French National Assembly for the Euskal Herria Bai party representing the Pyrénées-Atlantiques's 6th constituency. He served as the deputy mayor for Ciboure.

== Personal life ==
Dufau is the guitarist and a member of the musical group "Iluma".
