= Politics of Pyrénées-Atlantiques =

== Presidential elections ==
Election	Winning candidate	Party	%	Runner up	Party	%
2017	Emmanuel Macron	En Marche!	74.81	Marine Le Pen	National Front	25.19
2012	François Hollande	Socialist Party	57.12	Nicolas Sarkozy	UMP	42.88
2007	Ségolène Royal	Socialist Party	52.49	Nicolas Sarkozy	UMP	47.51
2002	Jacques Chirac	RPR	87.50	Jean-Marie Le Pen	National Front	12.50

== National Assembly Elections ==
Pyrénées-Atlantiques returns 6 members to the National Assembly

Constituency	Member	Party
Pyrénées-Atlantiques's 1st constituency	Josy Poueyto	MoDem
Pyrénées-Atlantiques's 2nd constituency	Jean-Paul Mattei	MoDem
Pyrénées-Atlantiques's 3rd constituency	David Habib	Socialist Party
Pyrénées-Atlantiques's 4th constituency	Jean Lassalle	Résistons!
Pyrénées-Atlantiques's 5th constituency	Florence Lasserre-David	MoDem
Pyrénées-Atlantiques's 6th constituency	Vincent Bru	MoDem

=== Pyrénées-Atlantiques - 6 seats ===
Constituency	1958	1962	1967	1968	1973	1978	1981	1988	1993	1997	2002	2007	2012	2017
Pyrénées-Atlantiques's 1st constituency	CNIP	CD	FGDS	CNIP	PS	PS	PS	PS	RPR	PS	PS	PS	PS	MoDem
Pyrénées-Atlantiques's 2nd constituency	FGDS	FGDS	FGDS	UDR	UDR	RPR	PS	UDF	UDF	UDF	MoDem	MoDem	PS	MoDem
Pyrénées-Atlantiques's 3rd constituency	DVD	RI	RI	RI	RI	UDF	UDF	PS	RPR	PS	UDF	NC	PS	LR
Pyrénées-Atlantiques's 4th constituency	UNR	UNR-UDT	UD-V^{e}	UDR	UDR	UDF	UDF	UDF	UDF	DL	UMP	UMP	UMP	REM
Pyrénées-Atlantiques's 5th constituency	CNIP	UNR-UDT	DVD	UDR	UDR	UDF	UDR	UDR	UDF	PS	UMP	UMP	EELV-PS	REM
Pyrénées-Atlantiques's 6th constituency														
