= Results of the 2024 French legislative election in Pyrénées-Atlantiques =

Following the first round of the 2024 French legislative election on 30 June 2024, runoff elections in each constituency where no candidate received a vote share greater than 50 percent were scheduled for 7 July. Candidates permitted to stand in the runoff elections needed to either come in first or second place in the first round or achieve more than 12.5 percent of the votes of the entire electorate (as opposed to 12.5 percent of the vote share due to low turnout).

== Pyrénées-Atlantiques ==
=== 1st constituency ===
Candidate	Party or alliance		First round		Second round	
Candidate	Party or alliance		Votes	%	Votes	%
François Verrière	National Rally		13,490	27.96	15,455	33.31
Josy Poueyto	Ensemble	Democratic Movement	12,939	26.82	30,942	66.69
Jean-Yves Lalanne	Miscellaneous left	Independent	9,625	19.95		
Jean Sanroman	New Popular Front	La France Insoumise	6,305	13.07		
Sandrine Lafargue	The Republicans		4,304	8.92		
Jérémy Zen	Ecologists	Independent	1,215	2.52		
Agnès Hegoburu	Far-left	Lutte Ouvrière	366	0.76		
Total			48,244	100.00	46,397	100.00
Valid votes			48,244	97.64	46,397	94.00
Invalid votes			351	0.71	831	1.68
Blank votes			813	1.65	2,128	4.31
Total votes			49,408	100.00	49,356	100.00
Registered voters/turnout			69,447	71.14	69,454	71.06

=== 2nd constituency ===
Candidate	Party or alliance		First round		Second round	
Candidate	Party or alliance		Votes	%	Votes	%
Monique Becker	National Rally		18,910	31.14	21,242	36.26
Jean-Paul Mattei	Ensemble	Democratic Movement	17,972	29.60	37,347	63.74
Julien Brunel	New Popular Front	The Ecologists	16,083	26.49		
Marc Labat	The Republicans		4,647	7.65		
Jacques Mauhourat	Ecologists	Independent	1,497	2.47		
Patrici Cescau	Regionalists	Independent	1,079	1.78		
Cyrille Marconi	Far-left	Lutte Ouvrière	530	0.87		
Total			60,718	100.00	58,589	100.00
Valid votes			60,718	97.37	58,589	94.23
Invalid votes			508	0.81	1,007	1.62
Blank votes			1,130	1.81	2,583	4.15
Total votes			62,356	100.00	62,179	100.00
Registered voters/turnout			84,672	73.64	84,677	73.43

=== 3rd constituency ===
Candidate	Party or alliance		First round		Second round	
Candidate	Party or alliance		Votes	%	Votes	%
David Habib	Miscellaneous left	The Convention	22,271	37.63	37,303	64.50
Nicolas Cresson	National Rally		18,670	31.55	20,530	35.50
Joëlle Losson	New Popular Front	La France Insoumise	10,255	17.33		
Gilles Mardelle	The Republicans		5,998	10.14		
Kevin Briolais	Ecologists	Independent	1,154	1.95		
Audric Armand Mège	Regionalists	Independent	475	0.80		
Antoine Missier	Far-left	Lutte Ouvrière	358	0.60		
Total			59,181	100.00	57,833	100.00
Valid votes			59,181	97.73	57,833	95.81
Invalid votes			402	0.66	727	1.20
Blank votes			974	1.61	1,804	2.99
Total votes			60,557	100.00	60,364	100.00
Registered voters/turnout			83,929	72.15	83,930	71.92

=== 4th constituency ===
Candidate	Party or alliance		First round		Second round	
Candidate	Party or alliance		Votes	%	Votes	%
Iñaki Echaniz	New Popular Front	Socialist Party	21,968	38.01	27,762	47.92
Sylviane Lopez	National Rally		14,806	25.62	16,753	28.92
Jean Lasalle	Miscellaneous right	Independent	10,434	18.05	13,419	23.16
Beñat Cachenaut	The Republicans		8,983	15.54		
Gracianne Mirande Bec	Regionalists	Independent	1,128	1.95		
Carlos Ribeiro	Far-left	Lutte Ouvrière	476	0.82		
Total			57,795	100.00	57,934	100.00
Valid votes			57,795	97.72	57,934	97.10
Invalid votes			422	0.71	429	0.72
Blank votes			928	1.57	1,304	2.19
Total votes			59,145	100.00	59,667	100.00
Registered voters/turnout			80,792	73.21	80,798	73.85

=== 5th constituency ===
Candidate	Party or alliance		First round		Second round	
Candidate	Party or alliance		Votes	%	Votes	%
Colette Capdevielle	New Popular Front	Socialist Party	22,643	32.30	40,607	62.64
Serge Rosso	National Rally		19,308	27.54	24,221	37.36
Florence Lasserre-David	Ensemble	Democratic Movement	18,667	26.63		
Valérie Castrec	The Republicans		4,198	5.99		
Johanna Grateloup	Ecologists	Independent	1,567	2.24		
Jean-Marie Erramuzpe	Regionalists	Independent	1,414	2.02		
Jean-Claude Labadie	Independent		1,010	1.44		
Alain Cayuella	Reconquête		671	0.96		
Philippe Bardanouve	Far-left	Lutte Ouvrière	477	0.68		
Hélène Susbielle	Regionalists	Independent	154	0.22		
Total			70,109	100.00	64,828	100.00
Valid votes			70,109	97.82	64,828	90.64
Invalid votes			488	0.68	1,439	2.01
Blank votes			1,073	1.50	5,253	7.34
Total votes			71,670	100.00	71,520	100.00
Registered voters/turnout			101,136	70.86	101,137	70.72

=== 6th constituency ===
Candidate	Party or alliance		First round		Second round	
Candidate	Party or alliance		Votes	%	Votes	%
Peio Dufau	New Popular Front	Regionalists	21,650	29.42	27,117	36.28
Christian Devèze	Ensemble	Democratic Movement	19,806	26.92	26,403	35.33
Victor Lastécouères	Union of the far right	The Republicans	18,610	25.29	21,222	28.39
Emmanuelle Brisson	The Republicans		8,546	11.61		
Jean Tellechea	Regionalists	Independent	3,712	5.04		
Frédéric Barrez	Far-left	Lutte Ouvrière	844	1.15		
Eva Pernet	Miscellaneous centre	Independent	248	0.34		
Corinne Berthelot	Independent		161	0.22		
Michel Lamarque	Independent		1	0.00		
Total			73,578	100.00	74,742	100.00
Valid votes			73,578	97.42	74,742	97.15
Invalid votes			562	0.74	556	0.72
Blank votes			1,390	1.84	1,634	2.12
Total votes			75,530	100.00	76,932	100.00
Registered voters/turnout			106,617	70.84	106,621	72.15
