= Martine Lignières-Cassou =

French politician

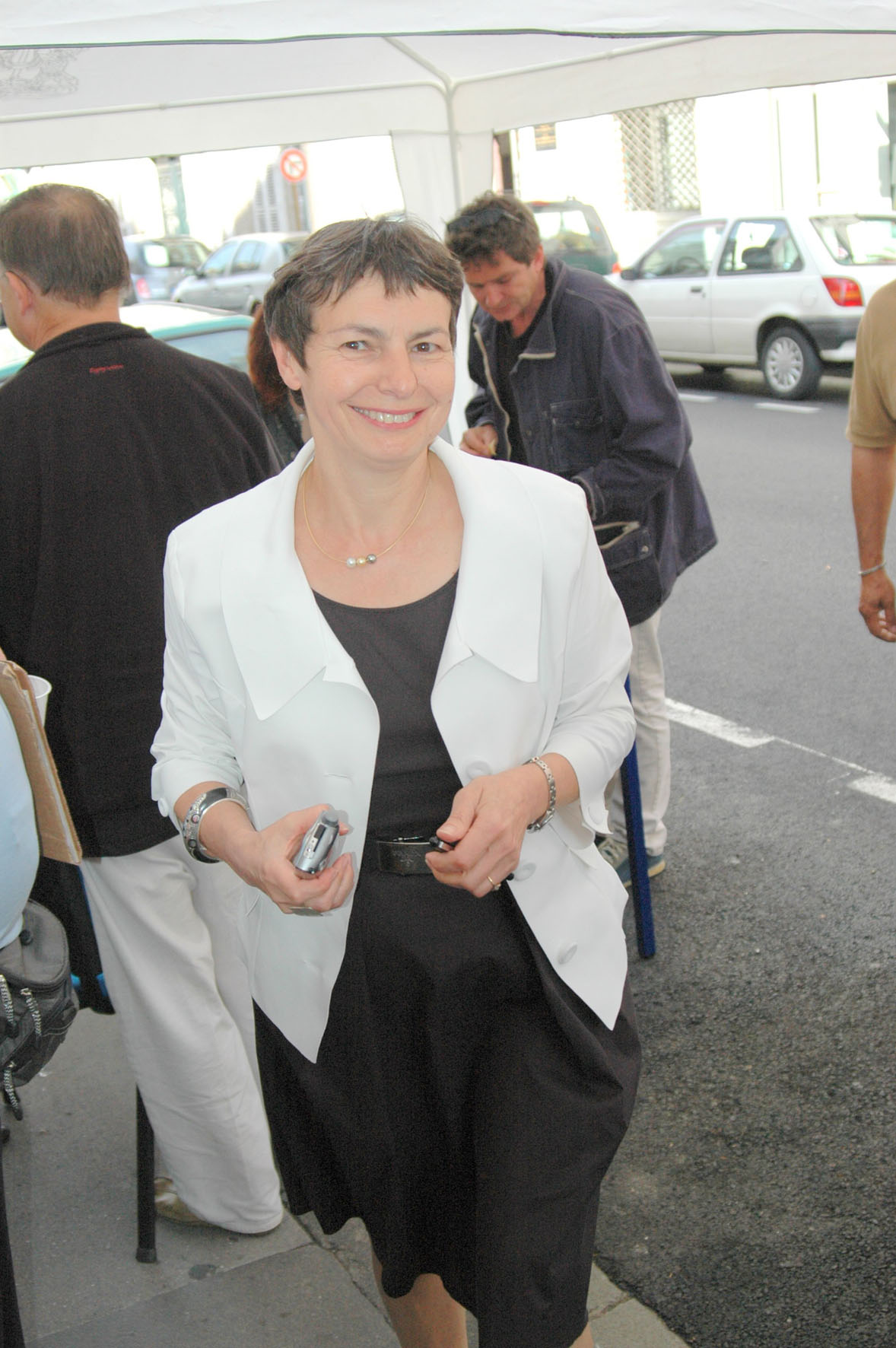

Member of the French National Assembly for Pyrénées-Atlantiques's 1st constituency
- In office 12 June 1997 – 20 June 2017
- Preceded by: Jean Gougy
- Succeeded by: Josy Poueyto

Mayor of Pau
- In office 21 March 2008 – 4 April 2014
- Preceded by: Yves Urieta
- Succeeded by: François Bayrou

Personal details
- Born: 22 February 1952 (age 74) Algiers, French Algeria
- Party: Socialist Party
- Education: University of Pau and Pays de l'Adour

Martine Lignières-Cassou (French pronunciation: [maʁtin liɲjɛʁ kasu]; born 22 February 1952) is a French politician who was a member of the National Assembly for 20 years. She represented the 1st constituency in the Pyrénées-Atlantiques department, and is a member of the Socialist Party and of the Socialiste, radical, citoyen et divers gauche parliamentary group. She was the mayor of Pau, Pyrénées-Atlantiques from 2008 to 2014. In the 1970s she was a member of the Revolutionary Communist League (LCR) before joining the Socialist Party in 1975.
