= Nicole Péry =

French politician (born 1943)

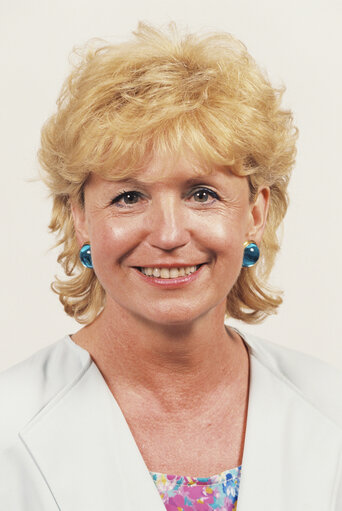

Secretary of State for Women's Rights and Professional Training
- In office 30 March 1998 – 6 May 2002
- Prime Minister: Lionel Jospin

Member of the National Assembly for Pyrénées-Atlantiques's 5th constituency
- In office 1 June 1997 – 1 May 1998
- Preceded by: Alain Lamassoure
- Succeeded by: Jean Espilondo

Member of the European Parliament
- In office 17 September 1981 – 16 July 1997
- Preceded by: Georges Sarre
- Succeeded by: Marie-José Denys

Personal details
- Born: 15 May 1943 (age 82) Bayonne, France
- Party: Socialist Party
- Profession: Teacher

Nicole Péry (born 15 May 1943) is a French politician who served as Secretary of State for Women's Rights and Professional Training from 1998 to 2002 under Prime Minister Lionel Jospin. A member of the Socialist Party (PS), she is a professor of literature by occupation.

Péry served as Deputy Mayor of Ciboure from 1977 to 1983, when she became leader of the municipal opposition in Bayonne. She entered the European Parliament in 1981 and the National Assembly in 1997, after she stood as a candidate in the 5th constituency of Pyrénées-Atlantiques. Péry was named special assistant to the Prime Minister for regional languages and cultures in October 1997 before her appointment as a Secretary of State to the Minister of Employment and Solidarity.

== Appointments ==
- 1973, 1978, 1981, 1988: parliamentary candidate
- 1977–1983: Deputy Mayor of Ciboure
- 1981–1997: Member of European Parliament
- 1984–1997: Vice-President of the European Parliament
- 1986–1994: regional councillor of Aquitaine
- 1997–1998: member of the National Assembly for Pyrénées-Atlantiques, spokeswoman for the Socialist group in the Committee on Foreign Affairs
- 1997-1998: special assistant to the Prime Minister for regional languages and cultures
- 1998-2002: Secretary of State for Women's Rights and Vocational Training

== Career highlights ==
In November 1998, the Government of France reaffirmed its political intent with regards to women's rights by appointing Péry as Secretary of State for Women's Rights and Vocational Training. At that time the Department of Women’s Rights of the Ministry of Employment and Solidarity was the main ad hoc administrative body responsible for monitoring gender equality and anti-discrimination measures. In a speech at Beijing + 5, in New York City on 5 June 2000, she affirmed France's position as an egalitarian nation.

In 2001 she criticised a Benetton advertisement for its portrayal of women's bodies. She was also critical of other advertising campaigns such as Yves Saint Laurent in 2001: "For several years, and with increasing frequency over the past months, advertising has presented images of women which many judge humiliating and degrading" she stated.

== Publications ==
- La formation professionnelle, Diagnostics, défis et enjeux. 1998

== See also ==
- Prostitution in France
