= Arrondissements of the Pyrénées-Atlantiques department =

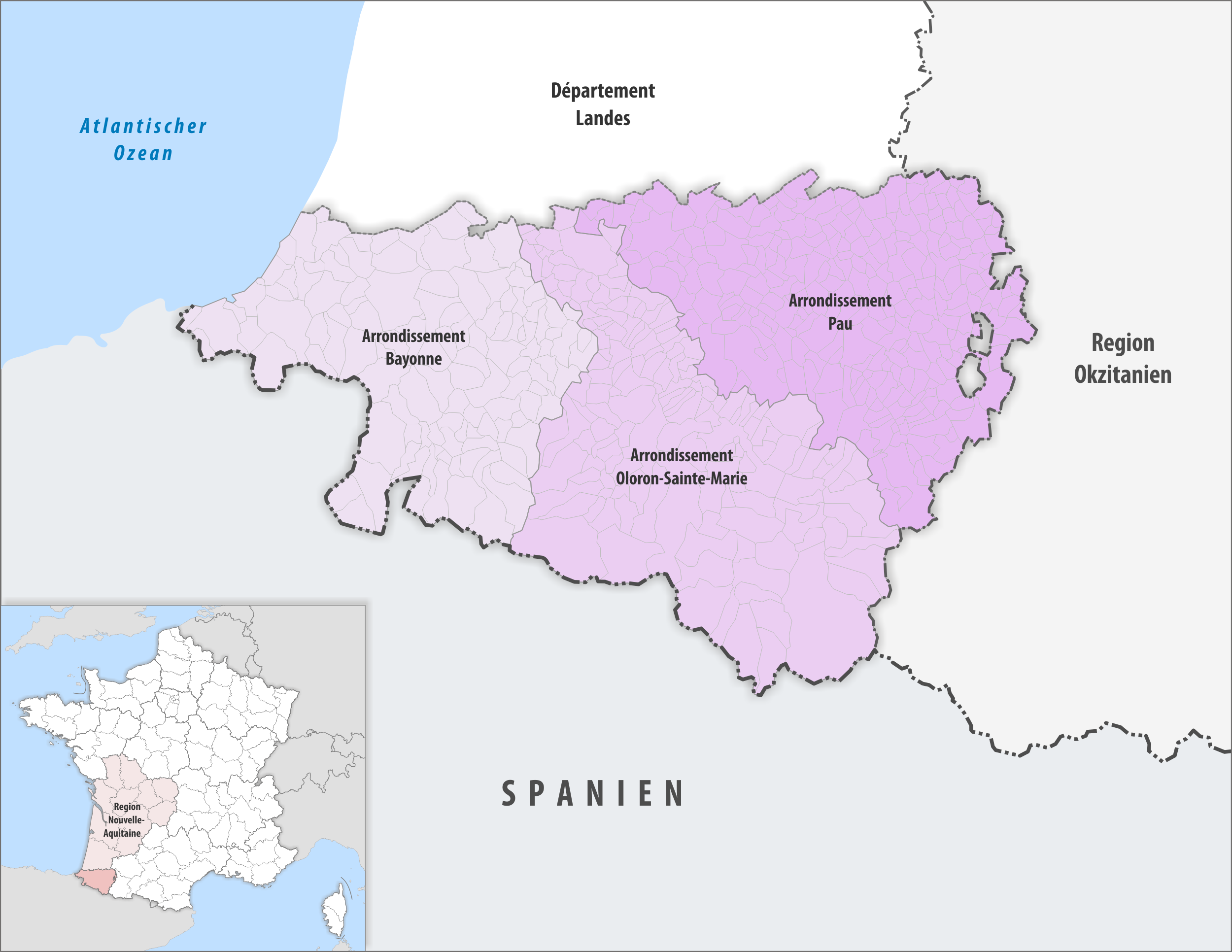
Map of arrondissements of the Pyrénées-Atlantiques department.

The 3 arrondissements of the Pyrénées-Atlantiques department are:

1. The Arrondissement of Bayonne (subprefecture: Bayonne) with 122 communes and a population of 309,392 in 2021.
2. The Arrondissement of Oloron-Sainte-Marie (subprefecture: Oloron-Sainte-Marie) with 155 communes and a population of 71,686 in 2021.
3. The Arrondissement of Pau (prefecture of the Pyrénées-Atlantiques department: Pau) with 269 communes and a population of 311,949 in 2021.

== History ==
In 1800 the arrondissements of Pau, Bayonne, Mauléon, Oloron and Orthez were established. The arrondissements of Mauléon and Orthez were disbanded in 1926.

The borders of the arrondissements of Pyrénées-Atlantiques were modified in January 2017:

- one commune from the arrondissement of Bayonne to the arrondissement of Oloron-Sainte-Marie
- 11 communes from the arrondissement of Oloron-Sainte-Marie to the arrondissement of Pau
- 11 communes from the arrondissement of Pau to the arrondissement of Oloron-Sainte-Marie
