= Lac Gentau =

Lake in France

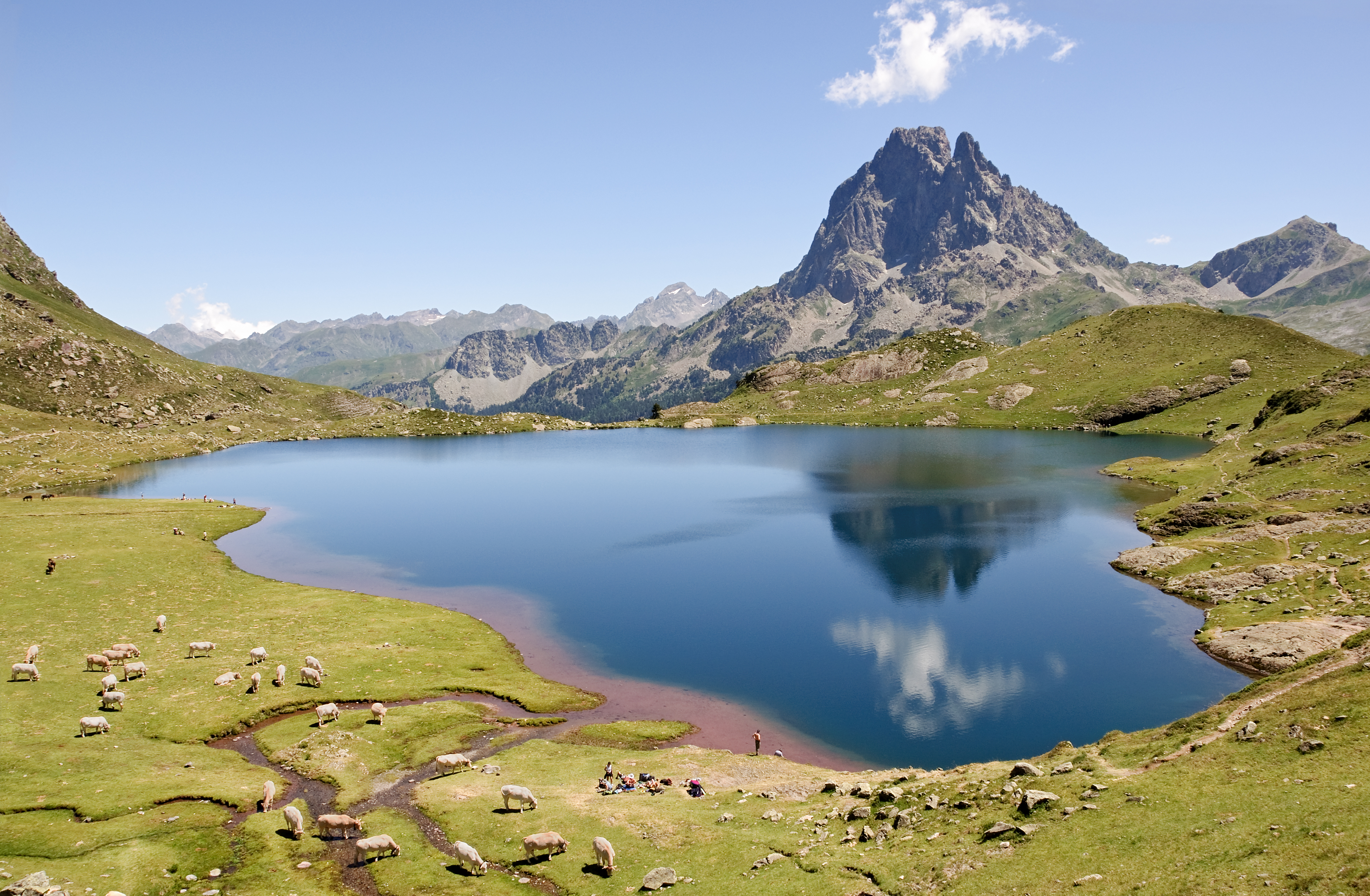
- Lac Gentau reflecting the Pic du Midi d'Ossau

- Location within Pyrenees
- Location: Pyrénées-Atlantiques, Pyrénées
- Coordinates: 42°50′53″N 0°29′14″W
- Basin countries: France
- Surface area: 0.093 km^{2} (0.036 sq mi)
- Max. depth: 20 m (66 ft) At an elevation of 1,947 m.
- Surface elevation: 1,947 m (6,388 ft) At an elevation of 1,947 m.

Lac Gentau is a lake in Pyrénées-Atlantiques, Pyrénées, France. At an elevation of 1947.3 m, its surface area is 0.093 km^{2}.
