= Lagor =

- Commune
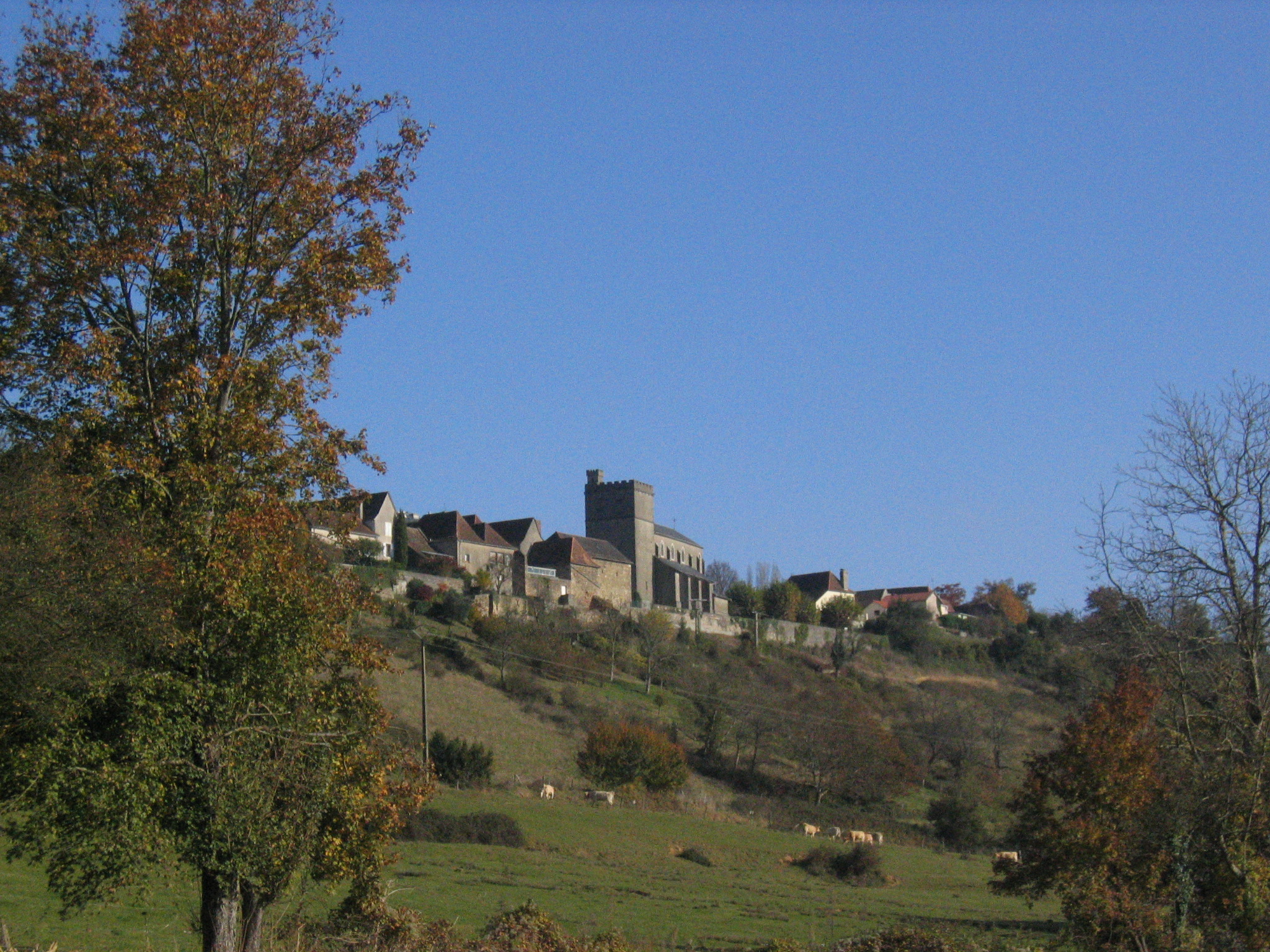
- A general view of Lagor

- Coat of arms
- Location of Lagor
- Location within France Location within Nouvelle-Aquitaine
- Coordinates: 43°23′36″N 0°39′04″W
- Country: France
- Region: Nouvelle-Aquitaine
- Department: Pyrénées-Atlantiques
- Arrondissement: Pau
- Canton: Le Cœur de Béarn
- Intercommunality: Lacq-Orthez

Government
  - Mayor (2020–2026): Franck Rolland
- Area^{1}: 20.97 km^{2} (8.10 sq mi)
- Elevation: 95 m (312 ft)
- Highest elevation: 252 m (827 ft)
- Lowest elevation: 82 m (269 ft)
- Population (2023): 1,121
  - Density: 53.46/km^{2} (138.5/sq mi)
- Time zone: UTC+01:00 (CET)
  - Summer (DST): UTC+02:00 (CEST)
- INSEE/Postal code: 64301 /64150
- ^{1} French Land Register data, which excludes lakes, ponds, glaciers > 1 km^{2} (0.386 sq mi or 247 acres) and river estuaries.

Lagor (French pronunciation: [laɡɔʁ]; Occitan: Lagòr) is a commune in the Pyrénées-Atlantiques department in south-western France.

== See also ==
- Communes of the Pyrénées-Atlantiques department
