= Lacs de Carnau =

Group of lakes in France

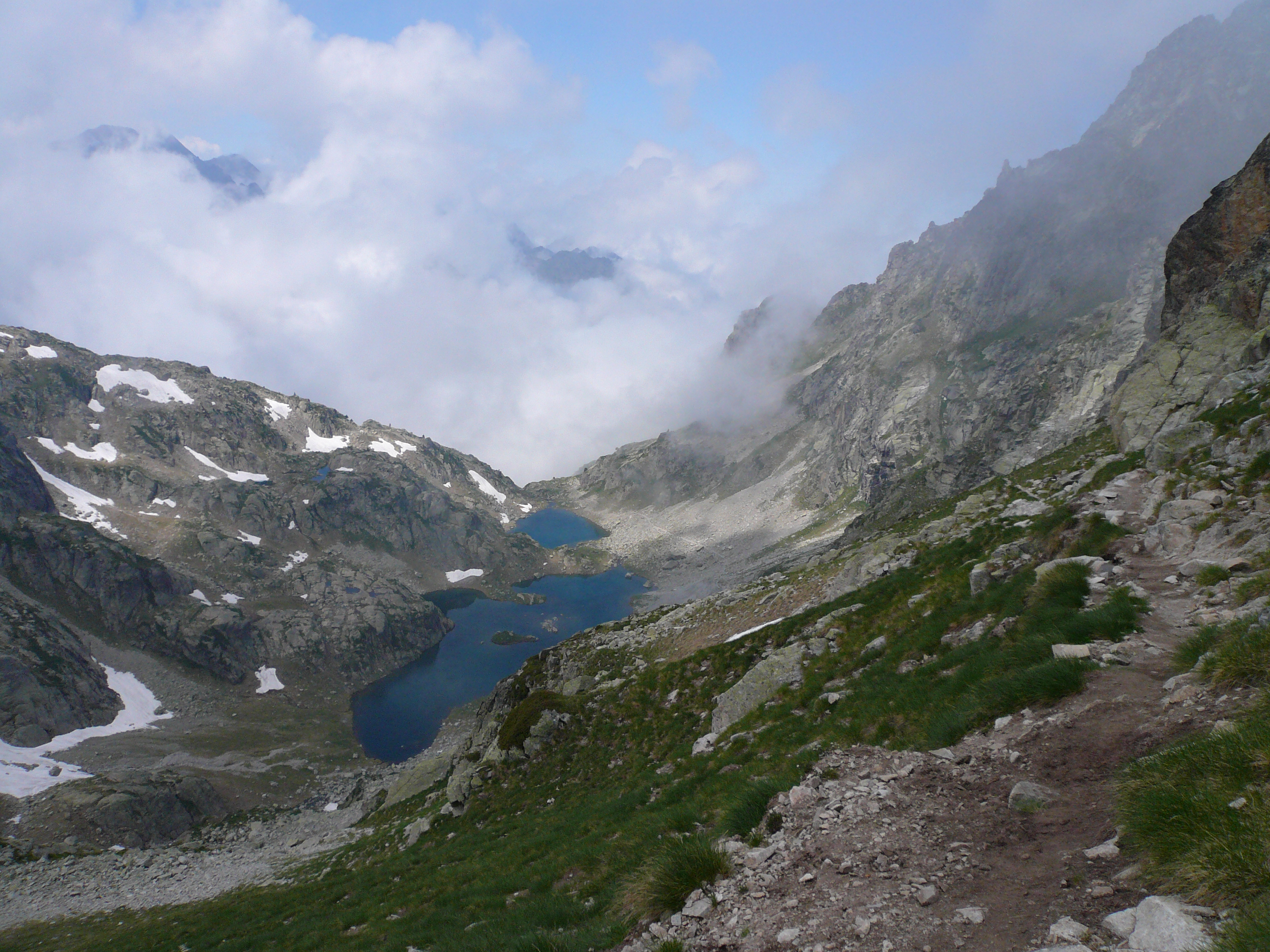

- Location within Pyrenees
- Location: Pyrénées-Atlantiques
- Coordinates: 42.877°N 0.318°W
- Basin countries: France
- Surface area: 3 ha (7.4 acres)
- Surface elevation: 2,202 and 2,208 m (7,224 and 7,244 ft)

Lacs de Carnau is a group of lakes in Pyrénées-Atlantiques, France. At an elevation of 2,202 and 2,208 m (7,224 and 7,244 ft), its surface area is 3 ha (7.4 acres).
