= Pyrénées-Atlantiques's 3rd constituency =

Constituency of the National Assembly of France

- inline Constituency of the National Assembly of France

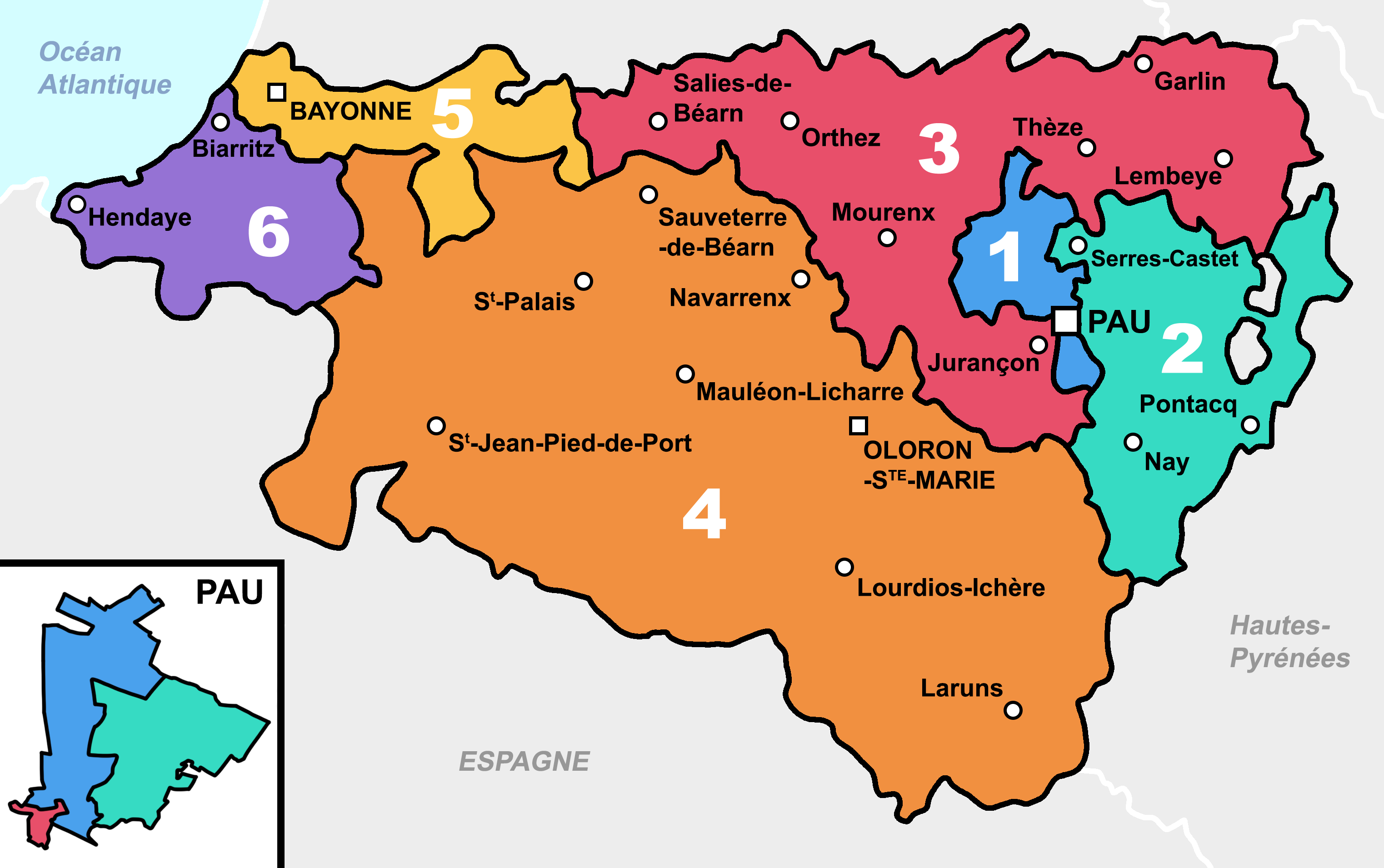
- The different constituencies of the Pyrénées-Atlantiques

- Pyrénées-Atlantiques in France
- Deputy: David Habib; PS
- Department: Pyrénées-Atlantiques
- Cantons: (pre-2015) Arthez-de-Béarn, Arzacq-Arraziguet, Garlin, Jurançon, Lagor, Lasseube, Lembeye, Monein, Orthez, Salies-de-Béarn, Thèze

The 3rd constituency of the Pyrénées-Atlantiques (French: Troisième circonscription des Pyrénées-Atlantiques) is a French legislative constituency in Pyrénées-Atlantiques département. Like the other 576 French constituencies, it elects one MP using the two-round system, with a run-off if no candidate receives over 50% of the vote in the first round.

== Deputies ==
Election	Member	Party
1988	André Labarrère	PS
1993	André Labarrère	PS
1997	André Labarrère	PS
2002	David Habib	PS
2007	David Habib	PS
2012	David Habib	PS
2017	David Habib	PS
2022	David Habib	PS

== Election results ==
=== 2024 ===
Candidate	Party	Alliance	First round		Second round	
Candidate	Party	Alliance	Votes	%	Votes	%
David Habib	DVG		22,271	37.63	37,303	64.50
Nicolas Cresson	RN		19,670	31.55	20,530	35.50
Joëlle Losson	LFI	NFP	10,255	17.33		
Gilles Maardelle	LR		5,998	10.14		
Kévin Briolais	DIV		1,154	1.95		
Audric Armand Mège	REG		475	0.80		
Antoine Messier	LO		358	0.60		
Votes			59,181	100	57,833	100
Valid votes			59,181	97.73	57,833	95.81
Blank votes			974	1.61	1,804	2.99
Null votes			402	0.66	727	1.20
Turnout			60,557	72.15	60,364	71.92
Abstentions			23,372	27.85	23,566	28.08
Registered voters			83,929		83,930	
Result			DVG HOLD			

David Habib is running for election as a dissident from PS as a DVG candidate.

=== 2022 ===
Legislative Election 2022: Pyrénées-Atlantiques's 3rd constituency
Party	Candidate	Votes	%	±%
PS	David Habib*	16,345	36.61	N/A
LFI (NUPÉS)	Jean-François Baby	9,211	20.63	-18.69
LR (UDC)	Fabienne Costedoat-Diu	7,342	16.45	+0.64
RN	Nicolas Cresson	6,847	15.34	+6.54
REC	Romane Albanel	1,497	3.35	N/A
DVE	Edith Peyre	1,181	2.65	N/A
Others	N/A	2,219	4.97	
Turnout		44,642	54.52	−2.35
2nd round result
PS	David Habib*	26,414	66.55	N/A
LFI (NUPÉS)	Jean-François Baby	13,277	33.45	−20.51
Turnout		39,691	51.69	−1.23
PS hold				

* PS dissident

=== 2017 ===
Results of the 11 June and 18 June 2017 French National Assembly election in Pyrénées-Atlantiques’ 3rd Constituency
Candidate	Party		1st round		2nd round	
Candidate	Party		Votes	%	Votes	%
Michel Bernos	La République En Marche!	LREM	13,647	29.79	18,164	46.04
David Habib	Socialist Party	PS	11,644	25.42	21,286	53.96
Eric Lytwyn	La France Insoumise	FI	5,020	10.96		
Lucinda Carvalho	National Front	FN	4,031	8.80		
Berard Dupont	Union of Democrats and Independents	UDI	4,008	8.75		
Pierre Saulnier	The Republicans	LR	3,234	7.06		
Isabelle Larrouy	Communist Party	PCF	1,348	2.94		
David Grosclaude	Regionalist	REG	736	1.61		
Edith Peyré	Ecologist	ECO	708	1.55		
Frédéric Pédedaut	Miscellaneous Left	DVG	429	0.94		
Eric Delteil	Far Left	EXG	273	0.60		
Eric Petetin	Ecologist	ECO	256	0.56		
Catherine Le Carrer	Independent	DIV	238	0.52		
Christian Marty	Far Left	EXG	237	0.52		
Total			45,809	100%	39,450	100%
Registered voters			82,751		82,747	
Blank/Void ballots			1,254	2.67%	4,339	9.91%
Turnout			47,063	56.87%	43,789	52.92%
Abstentions			35,688	43.13%	38,958	47.08%
Result					PS HOLD	

=== 2012 ===
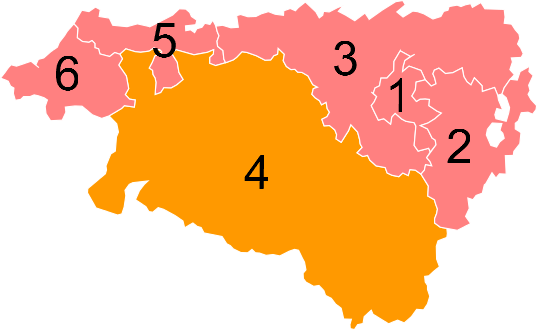
Results in Pyrénées-Atlantiques's six constituencies in 2012 : pink (PS), orange (R)

Results of the 10 June and 17 June 2012 French National Assembly election in Pyrénées-Atlantiques’ 3rd Constituency
Candidate	Party		1st round	
Candidate	Party		Votes	%
David Habib	Socialist Party	PS	28,419	56.31
Béatrice Yrondi	Union for a Popular Movement	UMP	9,012	17.86
Pascal Dussart	National Front	FN	4,957	9.82
Claudine Bonhomme	Left Front	FG	2,589	5.13
Sophie Bonnabaud	Democratic Movement	MoDEM	2,171	4.30
David Grosclaude	Occitan Party	REG	1,551	3.07
Stéphane Cômes	Independent Ecological Movement	MEI	524	1.04
Jacques Naya	Miscellaneous Right	DVD	413	0.82
Laurence Espinosa	New Anticapitalist Party	NPA	279	0.55
Maria Loire	Independent Ecological Alliance	AEI	232	0.46
Christian Marty	Workers’ Struggle	LO	180	0.36
Pascal Mercher	Independent Workers' Party	POI	141	0.28
Total			50,468	100%
Registered voters			81,929	
Blank/Void ballots			1,118	2.17%
Turnout			51,586	62.96%
Abstentions			30,343	37.04%
Result			PS HOLD	

=== 2007 ===
Results of the 10 June and 17 June 2007 French National Assembly election in Pyrénées-Atlantiques’ 3rd Constituency
Candidate	Party		1st round		2nd round	
Candidate	Party		Votes	%	Votes	%
David Habib	Socialist Party	PS	23,804	44.56	32,457	62.50
Laurence Sailliet	Union for a Popular Movement	UMP	14,714	27.55	19,471	37.50
Chantal Petriat	UDF-Democratic Movement	UDF-MoDem	7,874	14.74		
Hervé Cabannes	Communist Party	PCF	1,303	2.44		
Jean Buessard	National Front	FN	1,256	2.35		
Alain Mallet	The Greens	LV	1,196	2.24		
Jean-Marie Soubies	Hunting, Fishing, Nature and Traditions	CPNT	1,072	2.01		
Marianne Ligou	Far Left	EXG	986	1.85		
Philippe Gastambide	Ecologist	ECO	467	0.87		
Régine Pointet	Independent	DIV	455	0.85		
Christian Marty	Far Left	EXG	289	0.54		
Total			53,416	100%	51,928	100%
Registered voters			80,189		80,211	
Blank/Void ballots			978	1.80%	1,977	3.67%
Turnout			54,394	67.83%	53,905	67.20%
Abstentions			25,795	32.17%	26,306	32.80%
Result					PS HOLD	

=== 2002 ===
Results of the 9 June and 16 June 2002 French National Assembly election in Pyrénées-Atlantiques’ 3rd Constituency
Candidate	Party		1st round		2nd round	
Candidate	Party		Votes	%	Votes	%
David Habib	Socialist Party	PS	20,314	38.15	27,488	53.27
Lucien Basse-Cathalinat	Union for a Presidential Majority	UMP	15,171	28.49	24,114	46.73
Michel Bernos	Union for French Democracy	UDF	5,359	10.06		
Jean Beussard	National Front	FN	3,322	6.24		
Nicole Badetz	Hunting, Fishing, Nature and Traditions	CPNT	2,008	3.77		
Rene Lassalle	The Greens	LV	2,002	3.76		
Marcelle Estoueigt	Communist Party	PCF	1,571	2.95		
Sylvie Bacque	Revolutionary Communist League	LCR	968	1.82		
Joelle Coste	Far Right	EXD	905	1.70		
Sylvie Sury De	Movement for France	MPF	455	0.85		
Christian Marty	Workers’ Struggle	LO	391	0.73		
Claude Begue	National Republican Movement	MNR	345	0.65		
Xavier Piolle	Independent	DIV	227	0.43		
Veronique Dentel	Far Left	EXG	211	0.40		
Total			53,249	100%	51,602	100%
Registered voters			76,708		76,692	
Blank/Void ballots			1,378	2.52%	2,356	4.37%
Turnout			54,627	71.21%	53,958	70.36%
Abstentions			22,081	28.79%	22,734	29.64%
Result					PS HOLD	

== Sources ==
- French Interior Ministry results website: "Résultats électoraux officiels en France" (in French).
