= David Habib =

French politician (1961–2026)

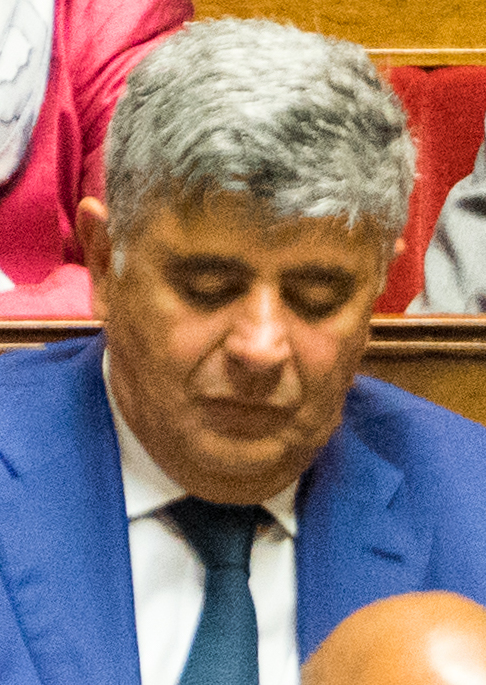
- Image of David Habbib

Member of the National Assembly for Pyrénées-Atlantiques's 3rd constituency
- In office 19 June 2002 – 19 November 2026
- Preceded by: André Labarrère

Vice-President of the National Assembly
- In office 1 October 2019 – 21 June 2022
- President: Richard Ferrand
- Preceded by: Francis Vercamer
- In office 1 January 2015 – 28 June 2017
- President: Claude Bartolone
- Preceded by: Christophe Sirugue
- Succeeded by: Hugues Renson

Mayor of Mourenx
- In office 25 June 1995 – 2014
- Preceded by: André Cazetien
- Succeeded by: Patrice Laurent

General councillor of Pyrénées-Atlantiques for the Canton of Lagor
- In office 29 March 1992 – 15 July 2002
- Preceded by: Félicien Prué
- Succeeded by: Jacques-Cassiau-Haurie

Personal details
- Born: 16 March 1961 Paris, France
- Died: 19 November 2026 (aged 65)
- Party: Socialist Party
- Education: Sciences Po Bordeaux
- Profession: Corporate executive

David Habib (16 March 1961 – 19 November 2026) was a French politician who served as a member of the National Assembly for Pyrénées-Atlantiques's 3rd constituency beginning in 2002. A member of the Socialist Party, Habib was the vice-president of the National Assembly from October 2019 to June 2022. He also served as mayor of Mourenx from 1995 to 2014 and general councillor of Pyrénées-Atlantiques from 1992 to 2002.

== Early life and education ==
David Habib was born to a family of Tunisian Jews in Paris, France on 16 March 1961. When he was six months old, his father moved the family to Pau, Pyrénées-Atlantiques for career-related reasons. Habib attended Sciences Po Bordeaux, graduating in 1983.

== Political career ==
Habib began his political career on the municipal council of Mourenx, Pyrénées-Atlantiques, to which he was elected in the 1989 French municipal elections. He was then appointed deputy mayor by the town's Communist mayor André Cazetien. In March 1992, Habib was elected to the General Council of Pyrénées-Atlantiques, representing the Canton of Lagord. This was followed by his election as mayor of Mourenx in the 1995 municipal elections. Habib was re-elected as general councillor in the 2001 municipal elections and became president of the community of communes of Lacq in 2002.

Habib entered national politics in the 2002 French legislative elections, where he was elected to the National Assembly for Pyrénées-Atlantiques's 3rd constituency. As a deputy, he joined the Socialist group. Habib then resigned from the general council of Pyrénées-Atlantiques in accordance with the law on the accumulation of political mandates.

Habib was re-elected to the National Assembly in the 2007 and 2012 legislative elections as well as the mayoralty of Mourenx in the 2008 municipal elections. In March 2014, he announced his candidacy for mayor of Pau at the head of a united electoral list of major left-wing parties. Habib was defeated in the second round of the 2014 municipal elections, winning 37% of the vote against François Bayrou's 63%. Nevertheless, the Socialist did gain a seat on the city's municipal council, but resigned several months later to run in a municipal by-election in Sarpourenx on 21 June 2015. He was elected to the city's municipal council and has served there since.

On 1 January 2015, Habib succeeded Christophe Sirugue as second vice-president of the National Assembly. He endorsed Manuel Valls in the 2017 Socialist presidential primary and was one of his eight campaign spokespersons. Habib was again re-elected in the 2017 legislative elections and was one of three deputies from the Socialist group to vote yes on a motion of confidence in the Second Philippe government.

During the 2022 legislative elections, Habib opposed the NUPES electoral alliance between the Socialists and La France Insoumise and instead called for his party to unite behind President Emmanuel Macron of La République En Marche. As a result, the governing Ensemble! coalition did not run a candidate against him in his re-election race and Habib returned to the National Assembly with 66.55% of the vote in the second round against Jean-François Baby of NUPES, who won 33.45%.

Habib sat on the National Defence and Armed Forces Committee, for which he served as vice-president from 2 October 2020 to 8 July 2021. He was previously a member of the Social Affairs Committee, the Economic Affairs Committee, the Foreign Affairs Committee, the Finance, General Economy and Budgetary Monitoring Committee, the Constitutional Acts, Legislation and General Administration Committee and the now-defunct Economic, Environmental and Territorial Affairs Committee. In addition to his committee assignments, Habib was part of the Tibet Study Group and was before that part of the French delegation to the Inter-Parliamentary Union (IPU). He was also vice-president of the Israel Friendship Group and was one of the only Socialist signatories of a letter to President Nicolas Sarkozy opposing potential French recognition of the State of Palestine.

== Death ==
Habib died on 19 November 2026, at the age of 65.
