= Colette Capdevielle =

French politician (born 1958)

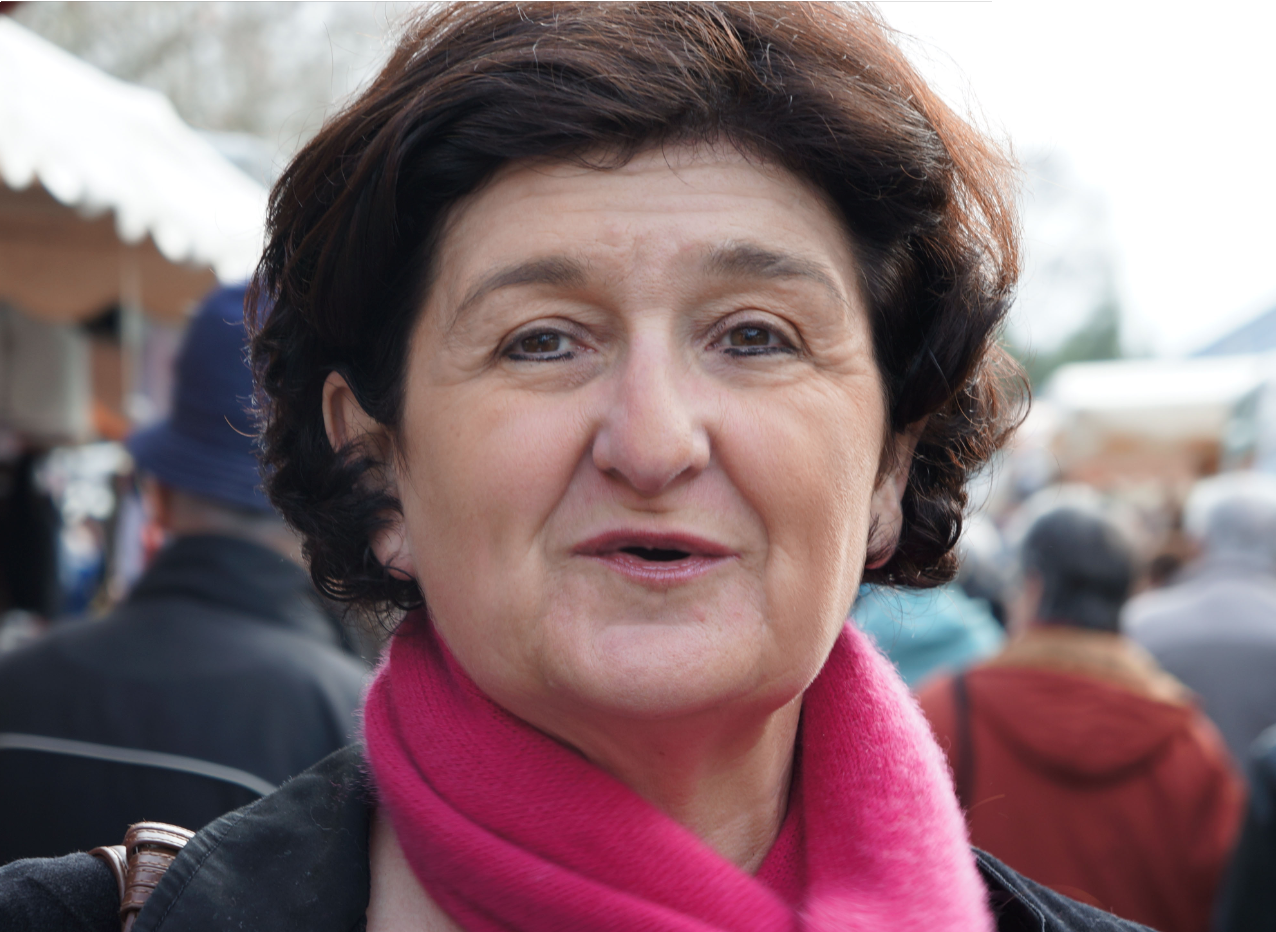

Member of the National Assembly for Pyrénées-Atlantiques's 5th constituency
- In office 20 June 2012 – 20 June 2017
- Preceded by: Jean Grenet
- Succeeded by: Florence Lasserre-David

Member of the National Assembly for Pyrénées-Atlantiques's 5th constituency
- Incumbent
- Assumed office 8 July 2024
- Preceded by: Florence Lasserre-David

Personal details
- Born: 14 October 1958 (age 67) Orthez, Pyrénées-Atlantiques, Nouvelle-Aquitaine, France
- Party: Socialist
- Other political affiliations: New Popular Front (2024)

Colette Capdevielle (born 14 October 1958) is a French Socialist politician who has represented Pyrénées-Atlantiques's 5th constituency in the National Assembly of France since the 2024 French legislative election. She represented the same seat in the 14th legislature of the French Fifth Republic, between 2012 and 2017.

== Political career ==
Capdevielle was elected in the general election in 2012, and was defeated for re-election in 2017 by Florence Lasserre-David of the Democratic Movement.

She returned to Parliament in the 2024 French legislative election.
