= Florence Lasserre-David =

French politician (born 1974)

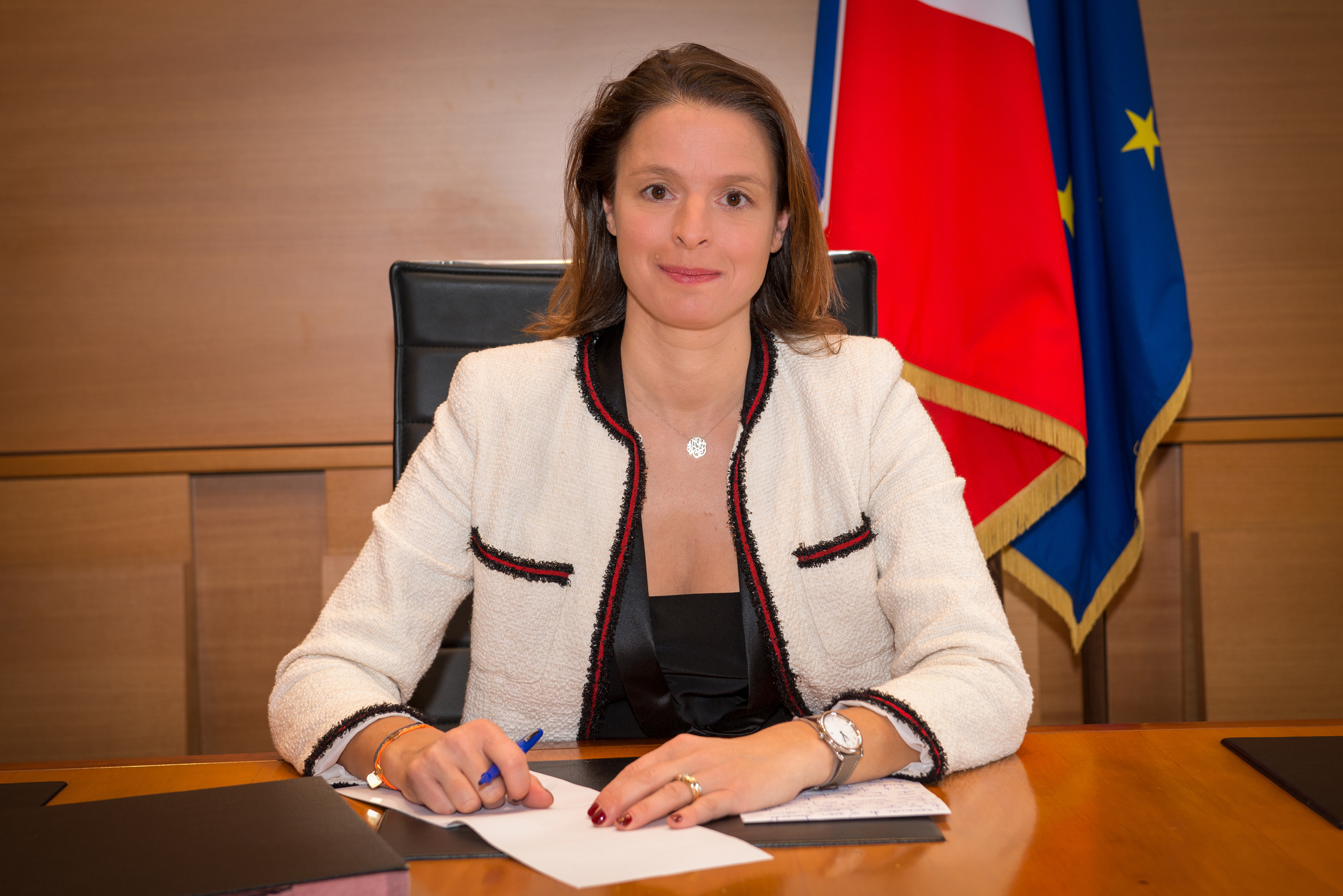

Member of the National Assembly for Pyrénées-Atlantiques's 5th constituency
- In office 21 June 2017 – 9 June 2024
- Preceded by: Colette Capdevielle
- Succeeded by: Colette Capdevielle

Personal details
- Born: 29 June 1974 (age 51) Bayonne, France
- Party: Democratic Movement

Florence Lasserre-David (born 29 June 1974) is a French politician of the Democratic Movement (MoDem) who was as a member of the French National Assembly since the 2017 elections, representing the department of Pyrénées-Atlantiques.

== Political career ==
In parliament, Lasserre-David serves on the Committee on Sustainable Development and Spatial Planning. In addition to her committee assignments, she is part of the French-Laos Parliamentary Friendship Group.

== Political positions ==
In July 2019, Lasserre-David voted in favour of the French ratification of the European Union's Comprehensive Economic and Trade Agreement (CETA) with Canada.

== Personal life ==
Lasserre-David is the daughter of Senator Jean-Jacques Lasserre.
