= Pyrénées-Atlantiques's 1st constituency =

Constituency of the National Assembly of France

1st constituency of the Pyrénées-Atlantiques
- inline Constituency of the National Assembly of France

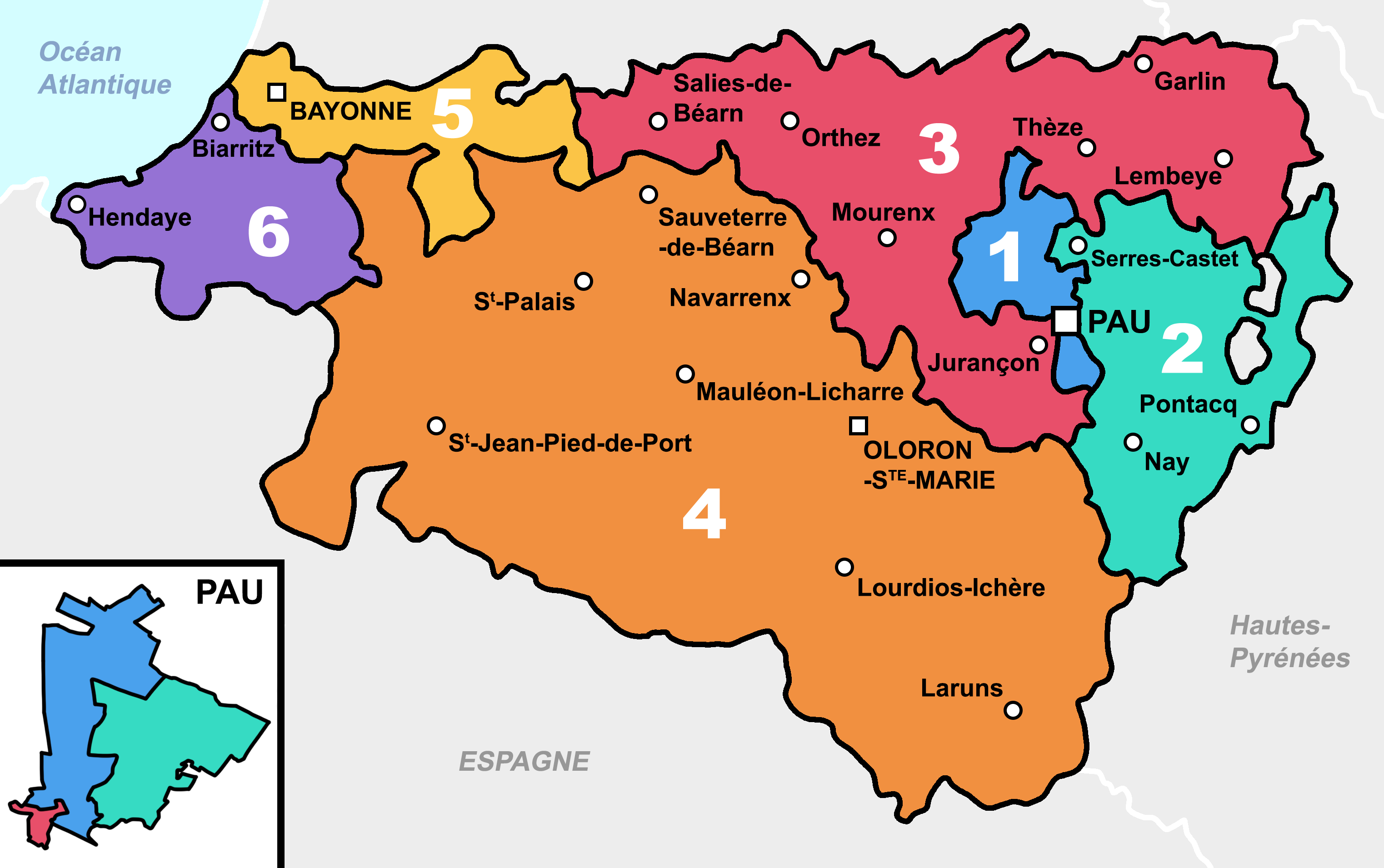
- The different constituencies of the Pyrénées-Atlantiques

- Pyrénées-Atlantiques in France
- Deputy: Josy Poueyto; MoDem
- Department: Pyrénées-Atlantiques
- Cantons: Pau-Nord, Pau-Centre, Pau-Ouest, Billère, Lescar
- Registered voters: 95320

The 1st constituency of the Pyrénées-Atlantique is a French legislative constituency in the Pyrénées-Atlantiques département. Like the other 576 French constituencies, it elects one MP using the two-round system, with a run-off if no candidate receives over 50% of the vote in the first round.

== Assembly members ==
Election	Member	Party
1988	René Cazenave	PS
1993	Jean Gougy	RPR
1997	Martine Lignières-Cassou	PS
2002	Martine Lignières-Cassou	PS
2007	Martine Lignières-Cassou	PS
2012	Martine Lignières-Cassou	PS
2017	Josy Poueyto	MoDem
2022	Josy Poueyto	MoDem

== Election results ==
=== 2024 ===
Candidate	Party	Alliance	First round		Second round	
Candidate	Party	Alliance	Votes	%	Votes	%
François Verrière	RN		13,490	27.96	15,455	33.31
Josy Poueyto	MoDEM	Ensemble	12,939	26.82	30,942	66.69
Jean-Yves Lalanne	Ind	DVG	19.95	19.95		
Jean Sanroman	LFI	NFP	6,305	13.07		
Sandrine Lafargue	LR		4,304	8.92		
Jérémy Zen	Ind	Eco	1,215	2.52		
Agnès Hegoburu	LO		366	0.76		
Valid votes			48,244	97.64	46,397	94.00
Blank votes			813	1.65	2,128	4.31
Null votes			351	0.71	831	1.68
Turnout			49,408	71.14	49,356	71.06
Abstentions			20,039	28.86	20,098	28.94
Registered voters			69,447		69,454	
Result			MoDEM HOLD			

=== 2022 ===
Legislative Election 2022: Pyrénées-Atlantiques's 1st constituency
Party	Candidate	Votes	%	±%
LFI (NUPÉS)	Jean-Yves Lalanne	11,318	31.78	+2.21
MoDem (Ensemble)	Josy Poueyto	11,243	31.57	-8.30
RN	François Verriere	4,991	14.01	+5.11
LR (UDC)	Sandrine Lafargue	2,709	7.61	−7.27
REC	Juliette Gillot	1,433	4.02	N/A
R!	Jacques-Henri Soulere	1,315	3.69	N/A
DVE	Muriel Lorenzi	1,016	2.85	N/A
Others	N/A	1,592	4.47	
Turnout		35,617	52.93	+0.04
2nd round result
MoDem (Ensemble)	Josy Poueyto	16,929	50.78	-11.94
LFI (NUPÉS)	Jean-Yves Lalanne	16,412	49.22	N/A
Turnout		33,341	52.49	+8.92
MoDem hold				

=== 2017 ===
Results of the 11 June and 18 June 2017 French National Assembly election in Pyrénées-Atlantiques 1st Constituency
Candidate	Party		1st round		2nd round	
Candidate	Party		Votes	%	Votes	%
Josy Poueyto	Democratic Movement	MoDem	14,112	39.87	15,438	62.72
Pauline Roy	The Republicans	LR	5,265	14.88	9,178	37.28
Jérôme Marbot	Socialist Party	PS	4,427	12.51		
Séverine Ghedjati	La France Insoumise	FI	4,404	12.44		
Claudie Cheyroux	National Front	FN	3,149	8.90		
Olivier Dartigolles	Communist Party	PCF	1,635	4.62		
Thérèse De Boissezon	Regionalist	REG	752	2.12		
Frédéric Pic	Miscellaneous Left	DVG	552	1.56		
Philippe Krompholtz	Debout la France	DLF	422	1.19		
Agnès Hegoburu	Far Left	EXG	282	0.80		
Elisabeth Meitner	Independent	DIV	261	0.74		
Djémory Diabaté	Miscellaneous Left	DVG	131	0.37		
Total			35,392	100%	24,616	100%
Registered voters			68,812		68,809	
Blank/Void ballots			1,000	1.46%	5,367	17.90%
Turnout			36,392	52.89%	29,983	43.57%
Abstentions			32,420	47.11%	38,826	56.43%
Result					MoDEM GAIN FROM PS	

=== 2012 ===
Results of the 10 June and 17 June 2012 French National Assembly election in Pyrénées-Atlantiques 1st Constituency
Candidate	Party		1st round		2nd round	
Candidate	Party		Votes	%	Votes	%
Martine Lignieres Cassou	Socialist Party	PS	14,700	37.61	20,861	57.64
Nicholas Patriarche	Union for a Popular Movement	UMP	9,096	23.27	15,331	42.36
Philippe Boell	National Front	FN	4,005	10.25		
Olivier Dartigolles	Left Front	FG	3,451	8.83		
Philippe Arraou	Centrist	CEN	2,976	7.61		
Danièle Iriart	The Greens	LV	1,962	5.02		
Thibault Cheneviere	Radical Party	PRV	826	2.11		
Mehdi Jabrane	Other	AUT	514	1.31		
Eric Schatz	Far Left	EXG	345	0.88		
Margua Ruland	Ecologist	ECO	328	0.84		
Julien Prat	Other	AUT	293	0.75		
Michèle Martin	Far Left	EXG	230	0.59		
David Vitini	Miscellaneous Right	DVD	184	0.47		
Jean Pichai	Centrist	CEN	178	0.46		
Total			39,088	100%	36,192	100%
Registered voters			68,853		68,848	
Blank/Void ballots			934	2.33%	2,291	5.95%
Turnout			40,022	58.13%	38,483	55.90%
Abstentions			28,831	41.87%	30,365	44.10%
Result					PS HOLD	

=== 2007 ===
Results of the 10 June and 17 June 2007 French National Assembly election in Pyrénées-Atlantiques 1st Constituency
Candidate	Party		1st round		2nd round	
Candidate	Party		Votes	%	Votes	%
Martine Lignieres Cassou	Socialist Party	PS	15,502	36.01	23,729	55.52
Bernard Layre	Union for a Popular Movement	UMP	14,752	34.27	19,012	44.48
Philippe Arraou	UDF-Democratic Movement	UDF-MoDem	6,888	16.00		
Bernard Laclau-Lacrouts	The Greens	LV	1,311	3.05		
Jacques Henriot	National Front	FN	1,199	2.79		
Danielle Raucoules	Communist Party	PCF	882	2.05		
Alain Garcia	Far Left	EXG	798	1.85		
Sylvia Benoist-Heurtebize	Movement for France	MPF	507	1.18		
Frédéric Pic	Far Left	EXG	387	0.90		
Michèle Boucau	Hunting, Fishing, Nature and Traditions	CPNT	363	0.84		
Dominique Mialocq	Independent	DIV	293	0.68		
Antoine Missier	Far Left	EXG	170	0.39		
Total			43,052	100%	42,741	100%
Registered voters			68,553		68,348	
Blank/Void ballots			645	1.48%	1,425	3.23%
Turnout			43,697	63.74%	44,166	64.62%
Abstentions			24,856	36.26%	24,182	35.38%
Result					PS HOLD	

=== 2002 ===
Results of the 9 June and 16 June 2002 French National Assembly election in Pyrénées-Atlantiques 1st Constituency
Candidate	Party		1st round		2nd round	
Candidate	Party		Votes	%	Votes	%
Martine Lignieres Cassou	Socialist Party	PS	16,712	38.42	21,528	53.10
Jean Gougy	Union for a Presidential Majority	UMP	12,313	28.31	19,011	46.90
Jean Arriau	Miscellaneous Right	DVD	5,116	11.76		
Jacques Henriot	National Front	FN	3,389	7.79		
Louise Mayerau	The Greens	LV	1,444	3.32		
Olivier Dartigolles	Communist Party	PCF	1,009	2.32		
Nadia Markovic	Revolutionary Communist League	LCR	715	1.64		
Philippe Arraou	Independent	DIV	656	1.51		
Severine Degonzague	Hunting, Fishing, Nature and Traditions	CPNT	558	1.28		
Gerard Rever	Far Right	EXD	366	0.84		
Nadege Vidal	Pôle Républicain	PR	341	0.78		
Antoine Missier	Workers' Struggle	LO	335	0.77		
Viviane Drouillard	Movement for France	MPF	326	0.75		
Georges Pachtere De	National Republican Movement	MNR	213	0.49		
Celine Houari	Independent	DIV	0	0.00		
Total			43,493	100%	40,539	100%
Registered voters			65,499		65,104	
Blank/Void ballots			862	1.94%	1,700	4.02%
Turnout			44,355	67.72%	42,239	64.88%
Abstentions			21,144	32.28%	22,865	35.12%
Result					PS HOLD	
