= Pyrénées-Atlantiques's 5th constituency =

Constituency of the National Assembly of France

5th constituency of Pyrénées-Atlantiques
- inline Constituency of the National Assembly of France

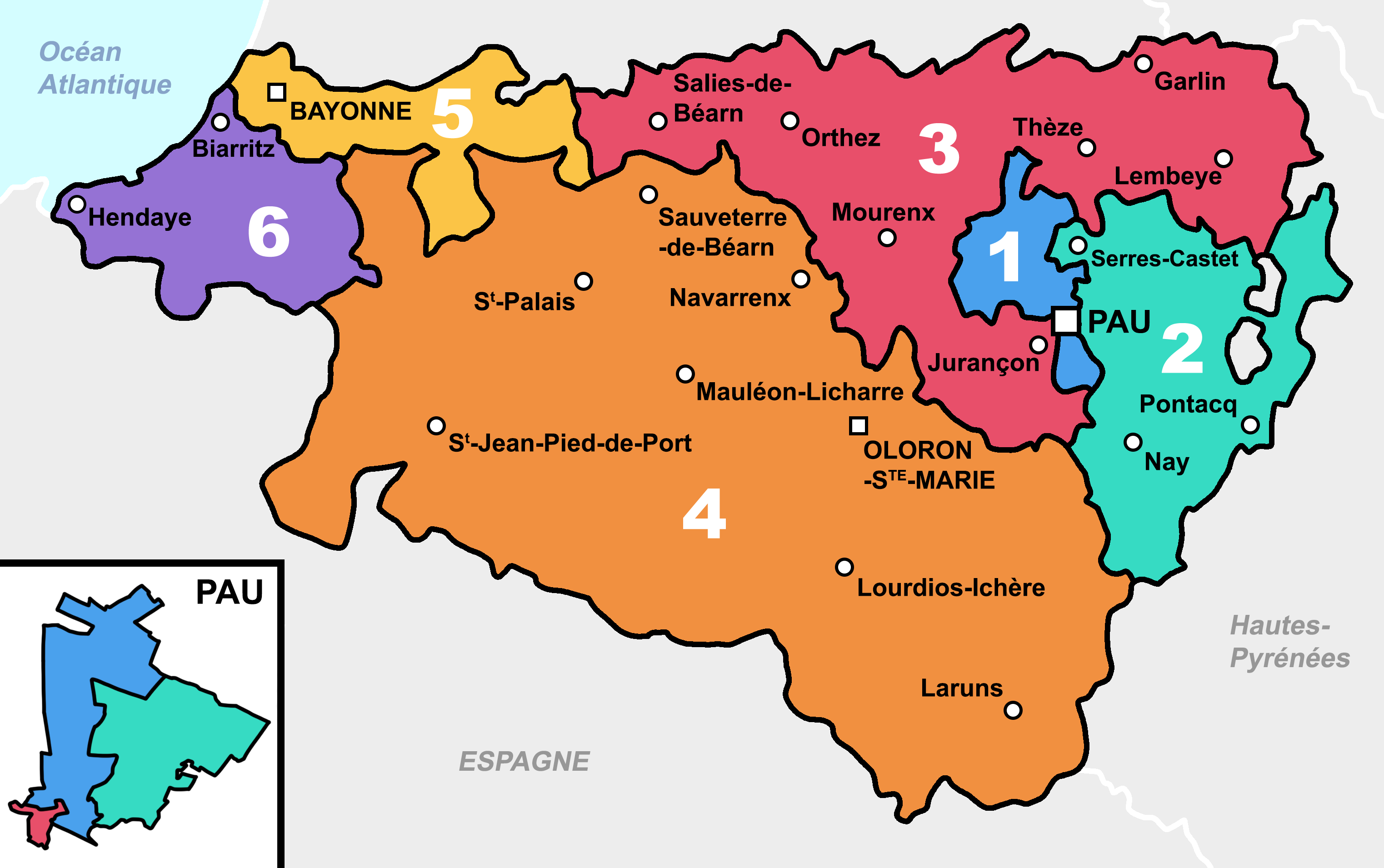
- The different constituencies of the Pyrénées-Atlantiques

- Pyrénées-Atlantiques in France
- Deputy: Colette Capdevielle; PS
- Department: Pyrénées-Atlantiques
- Cantons: (pre-2015) Anglet-Nord, Anglet-Sud, Bayonne-Est, Bayonne-Nord, Bayonne-Ouest, Bidache, La Bastide-Clairence, Saint-Pierre-d'Irube
- Registered voters: 127,790

The 5th constituency of Pyrénées-Atlantiques (French: Cinquième circonscription des Pyrénées-Atlantiques) is a French legislative constituency in Pyrénées-Atlantiques departments. Like the other 576 French constituencies, it elects one member of the National Assembly using the two-round system, with a run-off if no candidate receives over 50% of the vote in the first round. In the 2017 legislative election, Florence Lasserre-David of the Democratic Movement (MoDem) won a majority of the vote.

== Deputies ==
Election	Member	Party
1988	Alain Lamassoure	UDF
1993	Alain Lamassoure	UDF
1997	Nicole Péry	PS
1998	Jean Espilondo	PS
2002	Jean Grenet	UMP
2007	Jean Grenet	UMP
2012	Colette Capdevielle	PS
2017	Florence Lasserre	MoDem
2022	Florence Lasserre	MoDem
2024	Colette Capdevielle	PS

== Election results ==
=== 2024 ===
Candidate	Party	Alliance	First round		Second round	
Candidate	Party	Alliance	Votes	%	Votes	%
Colette Capdevielle	PS	NFP	22,643	32.30	40,607	62.64
Serge Rosso	RN		19,308	27.54	24,221	37.36
Florence Lasserre-David	MoDEM	Ensemble	18,667	26.63		
Valérie Castrec	LR		4,198	5.99		
Johanna Grateloup	Ind	The Ecologists (France)	1,567	2.24		
Jean-Marie Erramuzpe	Ind	REG	1,414	2.02		
Jean-Claude Labadie	Ind		1,010	1.44		
Alain Cayuella	R!		671	0.96		
Philippe Bardanouve	LO		477	0.68		
Hélène Susbielle	Ind	Reg	154	0.22		
Valid votes			70,109	97.82	64,828	90.64
Blank votes			1,073	1.50	5,253	7.34
Null votes			488	0.68	1,439	1,439 2.01
Turnout			71,670	70.86	71,520	70.72
Abstentions			29,466	29.14	29,617	29.28
Registered voters			101,136		101,137	
Result			PS GAIN OVER MoDEM			

=== 2022 ===
Legislative Election 2022: Pyrénées-Atlantiques's 5th constituency
Party	Candidate	Votes	%	±%
MoDem (Ensemble)	Florence Lasserre	16,658	33.98	-3.13
LFI (NUPÉS)	Sandra Pereira-Ostanel	12,323	25.14	-5.17
RN	Pascal Lesellier	6,796	13.86	+6.71
REG	Mathilde Hary	4,386	8.95	N/A
REC	Annick Pillot	2,725	5.56	N/A
Volt	Thibault Pathias	1,594	3.25	N/A
R!	Hélène Susbielle	1,561	3.18	N/A
DVE	Sylvie Roubin	1,480	3.02	N/A
Others	N/A	1,497	3.05	
Turnout		49,020	50.45	−2.47
2nd round result
MoDem (Ensemble)	Florence Lasserre	24,184	54.40	-2.63
LFI (NUPÉS)	Sandra Pereira-Ostanel	20,269	45.60	N/A
Turnout		44,453	48.92	+4.35
MoDem hold				

=== 2017 ===
Results of the 11 June and 18 June 2017 French National Assembly election in Pyrénées-Atlantiques' 5th Constituency
Candidate	Party		1st round		2nd round	
Candidate	Party		Votes	%	Votes	%
Florence Lasserre-David	Democratic Movement	MoDem	17,528	37.11	20,623	57.03
Colette Capdevielle	Socialist Party	PS	6,253	13.24	15,536	42.97
Caroline Oustalet	The Republicans	LR	5,353	11.33		
Jérémy Farge	La France Insoumise	FI	4,942	10.46		
Jean-Michel Iratchet	National Front	FN	3,378	7.15		
Laurence Hardouin	Regionalist	REG	2,675	5.66		
Thibault Pathias	Ecologist	ECO	1,994	4.22		
Yves Ugalde	Union of Democrats and Independents	UDI	1,647	3.49		
Marie José Rivas	Communist Party	PCF	1,130	2.39		
Jean-Claude Labadie	Independent	DIV	578	1.22		
Pascal Lesellier	Debout la France	DLF	494	1.05		
Laurent Marlin	Regionalist	REG	397	0.84		
Rémy Iroz	Miscellaneous Right	DVD	388	0.82		
Romain Doïmo	Independent	DIV	248	0.53		
Philippe Bardanouve	Far Left	EXG	225	0.48		
Total			47,230	100%	36,159	100%
Registered voters			90,982		90,977	
Blank/Void ballots			921	1.92%	4,393	10.83%
Turnout			48,151	52.92%	40,552	44.57%
Abstentions			42,831	47.08%	50,425	55.43%
Result					MoDEM GAIN FROM PS	

=== 2012 ===
Results of the 10 June and 17 June 2012 French National Assembly election in Pyrénées-Atlantiques’ 5th Constituency
Candidate	Party		1st round		2nd round	
Candidate	Party		Votes	%	Votes	%
Colette Capdevielle	Socialist Party	PS	18,756	37.70	27,067	56.47
Jean Grenet	Radical Party	PR	15,106	30.36	20,864	43.53
Chantal Renou	National Front	FN	3,551	7.14		
Bernadette Lavigne	Left Front	FG	2,797	5.62		
Laurence Hardouin	Regionalist	REG	2,626	5.28		
Jean-Baptiste Mortalena	Other	AUT	2,063	4.15		
Marie-Ange Thebaud	Europe Ecology – The Greens	EELV	1,801	3.62		
Jacques Veunac	Democratic Movement	MoDem	1,714	3.44		
Pascal Lesellier	Miscellaneous Right	DVD	417	0.84		
Serge Nogues	Far Left	EXG	378	0.76		
Alexa Hilaire	Ecologist	ECO	373	0.75		
Danièle Hubert	Far Left	EXG	172	0.35		
Stéphane Bernard	Other	AUT	1	0.00		
Total			49,755	100%	47,931	100%
Registered voters			85,476		85,475	
Blank/Void ballots			672	1.33%	1,933	3.88%
Turnout			50,427	59.00%	49,864	58.34%
Abstentions			35,049	41.00%	35,611	41.66%
Result					PS GAIN FROM UMP	

=== 2007 ===
Results of the 10 June and 17 June 2007 French National Assembly election in Pyrénées-Atlantiques’ 5th Constituency
Candidate	Party		1st round		2nd round	
Candidate	Party		Votes	%	Votes	%
Jean Grenet	Union for a Popular Movement	UMP	21,570	43.21	25,037	52.93
Jean Espilondo	Socialist Party	PS	13,799	27.65	22,266	47.07
Marie-Hélène Chabaud-Nadin	UDF-Democratic Movement	UDF-MoDem	4,919	9.85		
Miguel Torre	Regionalist	REG	2,247	4.50		
Martine Bisauta	The Greens	LV	1,780	3.57		
Marie-José Espiaube	Communist Party	PCF	1,774	3.55		
Martine Mailfert	Far Left	EXG	1,180	2.36		
Chantal Renou	National Front	FN	1,163	2.33		
Guy Eneco	Hunting, Fishing, Nature and Traditions	CPNT	717	1.44		
Gildas Blandin	Independent	DIV	348	0.70		
Danièle Hubert	Far Left	EXG	266	0.53		
Pascal Lesellier	Miscellaneous Right	DVD	151	0.30		
Total			49,914	100%	47,303	100%
Registered voters			82,921		82,914	
Blank/Void ballots			699	1.38%	1,978	4.01%
Turnout			50,613	61.04%	49,281	59.44%
Abstentions			32,308	38.96%	33,633	40.56%
Result					UMP HOLD	

=== 2002 ===
Results of the 9 June and 16 June 2002 French National Assembly election in Pyrénées-Atlantiques’ 5th Constituency
Candidate	Party		1st round		2nd round	
Candidate	Party		Votes	%	Votes	%
Jean Grenet	Union for a Presidential Majority	UMP	20,593	42.19	25,012	55.08
Jean Espilondo	Socialist Party	PS	14,367	29.44	20,402	44.92
Josette Allizan	National Front	FN	2,994	6.13		
M. Jose Espiaube	Communist Party	PCF	2,135	4,37		
Martine Bisauta	The Greens	LV	2,107	4.32		
J. Marc Abadie	Regionalist	REG	1,775	3.64		
Serge Harismendy	Miscellaneous Right	DVD	1,300	2.66		
Guy Eneco	Hunting, Fishing, Nature and Traditions	CPNT	1,263	2.59		
Martine Mailfert	Revolutionary Communist League	LCR	731	1.50		
Claire Nobila	Regionalist	REG	557	1.14		
Daniele Hubert	Workers’ Struggle	LO	337	0.69		
Christiane De Pachtere	National Republican Movement	MNR	219	0.45		
Francis Ducasse	Independent	DIV	199	0.41		
Eduardo Eraso	Far Left	EXG	156	0.32		
J. Christophe Roman	Independent	DIV	72	0.15		
Xavier Larralde	Regionalist	REG	0	0.00		
Total			48,805	100%	45,414	100%
Registered voters			76,780		76,774	
Blank/Void ballots			1,064	2.13%	2,078	4.38%
Turnout			49,869	64.95%	47,492	61.86%
Abstentions			26,911	35.05%	29,282	38.14%
Result					UMP GAIN FROM PS	

== Sources ==
- French Interior Ministry results website: "Résultats électoraux officiels en France" (in French).
- "Résultats électoraux officiels en France" (in French). 2017.
