= Josy Poueyto =

French politician (born 1954)

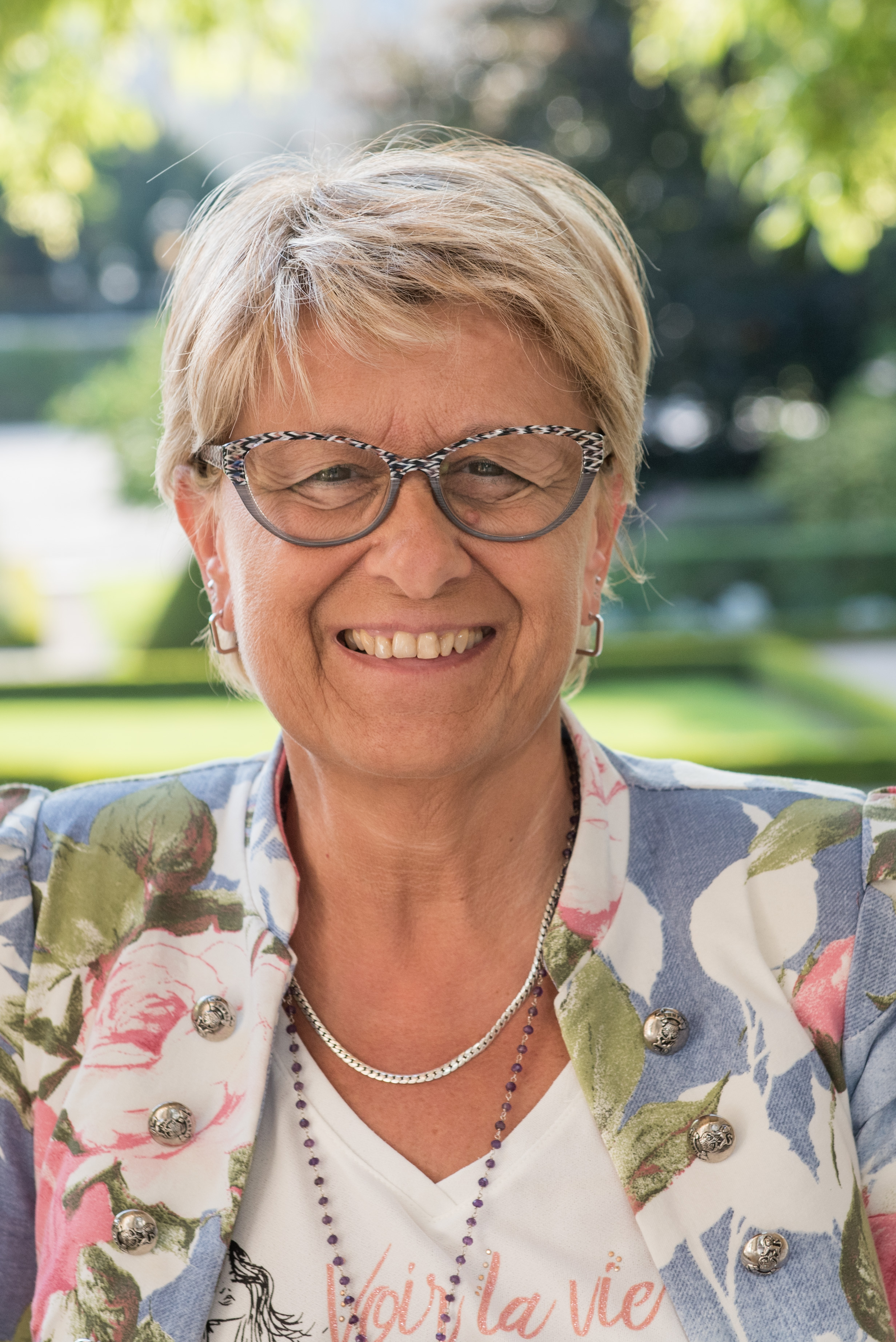
Josy Poueyto, June 2017

Josy Poueyto (born 13 January 1954) is a French politician representing the Democratic Movement. She was elected to the French National Assembly on 18 June 2017, representing the 1st constituency of the department of Pyrénées-Atlantiques.

== Biography ==
A member of the Socialist Party (France), she was elected General Councilor of the Pyrénées-Atlantiques in 1998 and re-elected in 2004. In 2008, she left the PS to join the Modem.

As first deputy mayor of Pau, Pyrénées-Atlantiques, she is very close to François Bayrou. In fact, it was he who encouraged her to run in these elections.

In June 2017, she was elected to Congress with 62.72% of the vote in the second round.

In June 2022, she was re-elected as a member of parliament with 50.78% of the vote in the second round, beating her opponent Jean-Yves Lalanne (New Ecological and Social People's Union) by 517 votes.

In 2024, she was re-elected after defeating the National Rally candidate with 66.69% of the vote.
