= Pyrénées-Atlantiques =

Department of France

Pyrénées-Atlantiques Pirenèus Atlantics (Occitan) Pirinio Atlantikoak (Basque)
- Department
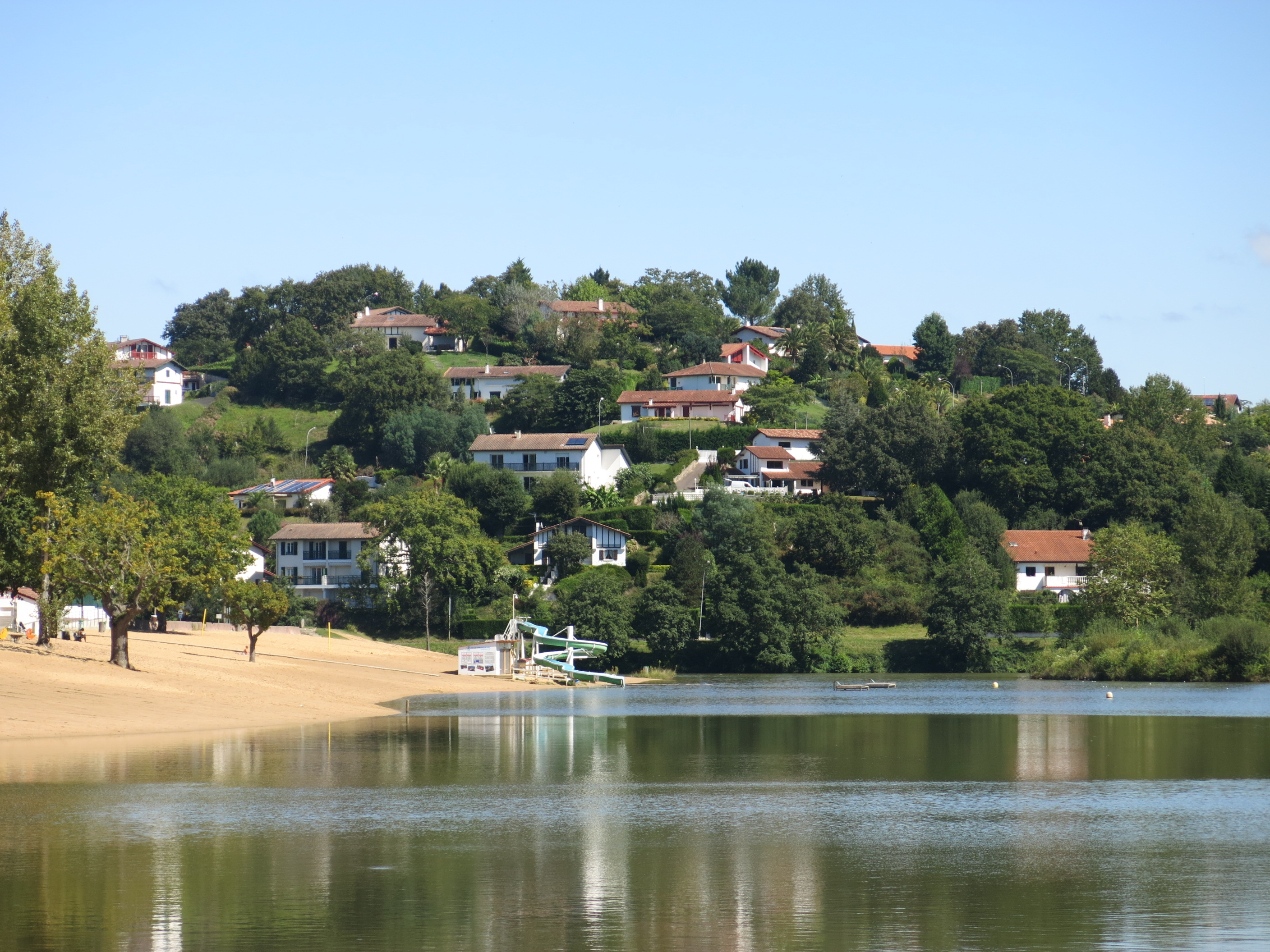
- Lake of Saint-Pée-sur-Nivelle

- Flag Coat of arms
- Nickname: 64, P-A
- Location of Pyrénées-Atlantiques in France
- Coordinates: 43°15′N 0°50′E
- Country: France
- Region: Nouvelle-Aquitaine
- Prefecture: Pau
- Subprefectures: Bayonne; Oloron-Sainte-Marie

Government
  - President of the Departmental Council: Jean-Jacques Lasserre (MoDem)

Area^{1}
  - Total: 7,645 km^{2} (2,952 sq mi)

Population (2023)
  - Total: 706,564
  - Rank: 36th
  - Density: 92.42/km^{2} (239.4/sq mi)
- Time zone: UTC+1 (CET)
- Postal code: 64
- ISO 3166 code: FR-64
- Department number: 64
- Arrondissements: 3
- Cantons: 27
- Communes: 545
- ^1 French Land Register data, which exclude estuaries and lakes, ponds and glaciers larger than 1 km^{2}

Pyrénées-Atlantiques (French pronunciation: [pi.ʁe.nez‿at.lɑ̃.tik]; Gascon Occitan: Pirenèus Atlantics; Basque: Pirinio Atlantikoak) is a department located in the region of Nouvelle-Aquitaine in the southwest corner of metropolitan France. Named after the Pyrenees mountain range and the Atlantic Ocean, it covers the French Basque Country and the Béarn. It is divided in three arrondissements and its prefecture is Pau. In 2023, it had a population of 706,564.

== History ==
Originally named Basses-Pyrénées, it was one of the 83 departments of France created during the French Revolution, on 4 March 1790. It comprised the territories of Labourd and Soule (in the provinces of Guyenne and Gascony), as well as Lower Navarre (still, at least nominally, part of the Kingdom of Navarre) and the Béarn. It was initially divided in six districts, with the prefecture at Navarrenx, before being moved to Pau on 14 October 1790.

French Basque Country (western side) and the Béarn (eastern side)

The 1790 administrative reform brought about the end of native institutions and laws. All Basque estates representatives from Labourd overtly opposed the new administrative layout since it suppressed their institutions and laws. The representatives of Lower Navarre refused to vote in Paris arguing that they were not part of the Kingdom of France; those of Soule voted against. The brothers Garat, representing Labourd, eventually voted yes, thinking that it would give them a say in upcoming political decisions.

In 1800, during the Consulate, the six initial districts were replaced by five arrondissements: Pau, Orthez, Bayonne, Mauléon and Oloron.

In 1926, as part of a vast reform launched by the government of Raymond Poincaré, the arrondissements of Orthez and Mauléon were abolished, resulting in the three current arrondissements.

In the 1950s, the Basses-Pyrénées were one of the departments composing the newly created region of Aquitaine.

In 1969, the name of the department was changed to "Pyrénées-Atlantiques", because the inhabitants of the department found the name of the Basses-Pyrénées pejorative compared to that of the Hautes-Pyrénées.

On January 1, 2016, the regions of Aquitaine, Poitou-Charentes and Limousin merged to form the Nouvelle-Aquitaine region.

== Geography ==
The southernmost department of Nouvelle-Aquitaine, it is bordered by the departments of Landes, Hautes-Pyrénées and Gers (to the north, east and northeast, respectively), by the Bay of Biscay to the west and by the Spanish provinces of Huesca, Navarre and Gipuzkoa to the south. Lac Gentau is located in Pyrénées-Atlantiques, as are the Lacs de Carnau.

The Pyrenees mountain range crosses the department from east to west from the Col d'Aubisque to the mouth of the Bidasoa at Hendaye. The border with Spain follows the Pyrenean chain.

The highest point is at the Pic Palas (commune of Laruns), in the Balaïtous massif, on the Franco-Spanish border, at 2,974 meters.

The summit of La Rhune (900 m) is particularly well-known because of its proximity to the coast (about ten kilometers) and its ancient tourist tradition.

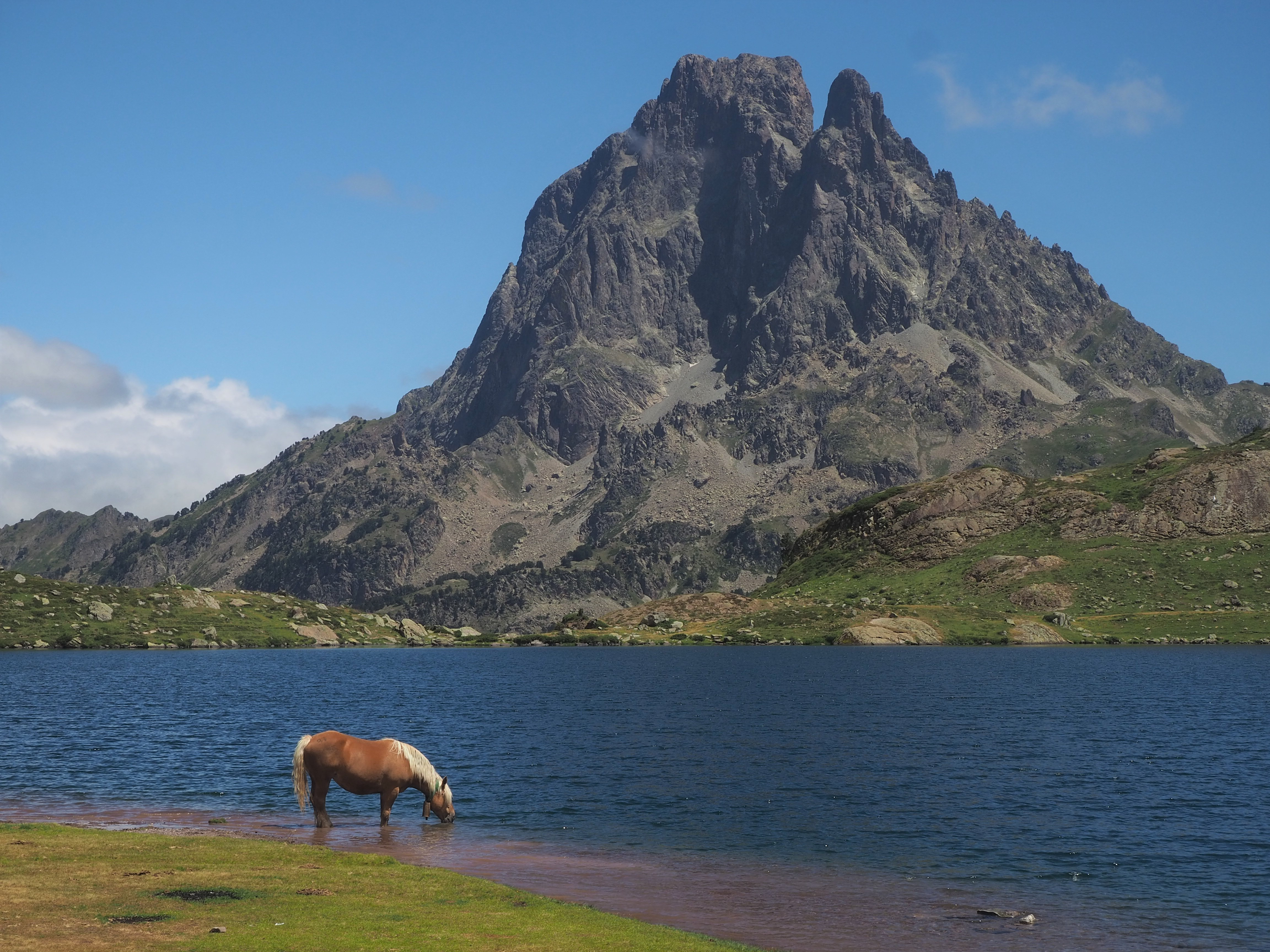
Pic du Midi d'Ossau

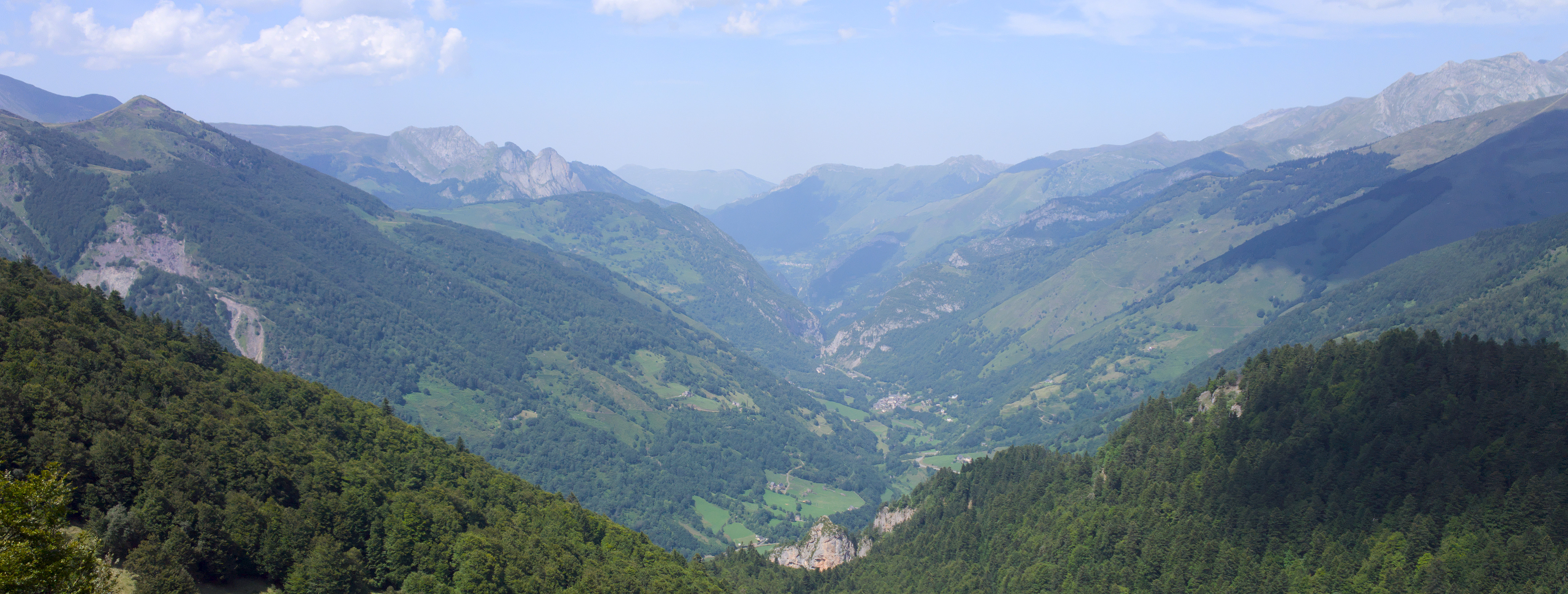
The Aspe Valley

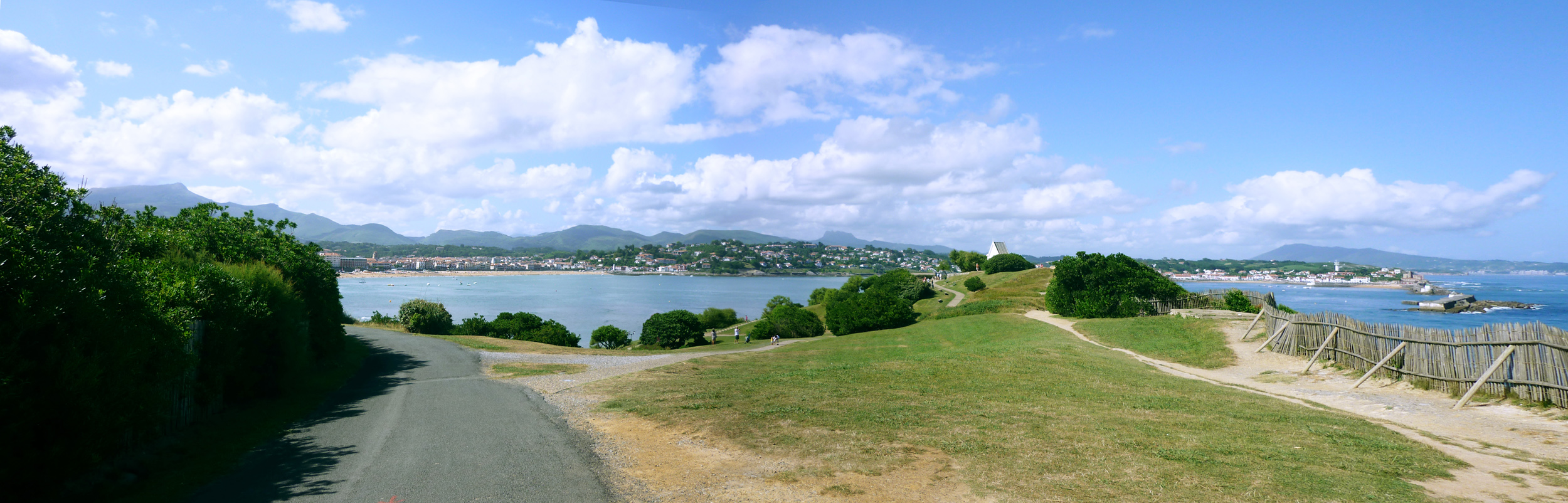
The French Basque Coast

=== Principal towns ===
The most populous commune is Pau, the prefecture. As of 2023, there are 8 communes with more than 12,000 inhabitants:

Commune	Population (2023)
Pau	80,441
Bayonne	54,306
Anglet	43,271
Biarritz	26,206
Hendaye	18,102
Saint-Jean-de-Luz	14,857
Billère	14,384
Lons	13,606

== Demographics ==
There does not seem to be a particular name to designate the inhabitants of the Pyrénées-Atlantiques. The western part is mainly inhabited by the Basques and the eastern part by the Béarnais, who since the Revolution and the creation of the department have shared the same department. However, from 1790 to 1969, the inhabitants were called Bas-Pyrénéens. The Pyrénées-Atlantiques have a fertility rate below the French average with 1.7 children per woman.

Population development since 1801:

Historical population

Year	Pop.	±% p.a.
1801	355,573	—
1811	383,502	+0.76%
1821	399,474	+0.41%
1831	428,401	+0.70%
1841	451,683	+0.53%
1851	446,997	−0.10%
1861	436,628	−0.23%
1872	426,700	−0.21%
1881	434,366	+0.20%
1891	425,033	−0.22%
1901	426,347	+0.03%
1911	433,318	+0.16%
1921	402,981	−0.72%
1931	422,719	+0.48%

Year	Pop.	±% p.a.
1936	413,411	−0.44%
1946	415,797	+0.06%
1954	420,019	+0.13%
1962	466,038	+1.31%
1968	508,734	+1.47%
1975	534,748	+0.71%
1982	555,696	+0.55%
1990	578,516	+0.50%
1999	600,018	+0.41%
2007	643,090	+0.87%
2012	660,871	+0.55%
2017	677,309	+0.49%
2023	706,564	+0.71%

== Economy ==
=== Urban areas ===
Pyrénées-Atlantiques, a border department, has cultivated a number of economic and cultural links with Spain.

Two urban concentrations exist in the east and west of the department: Pau, which has 145,000 inhabitants and 344,000 workers in the local area; and Bayonne-Anglet-Biarritz which has 166,400 inhabitants and 235,000 workers in the local area.

=== Tourism ===
The department is known for its tourism industry:

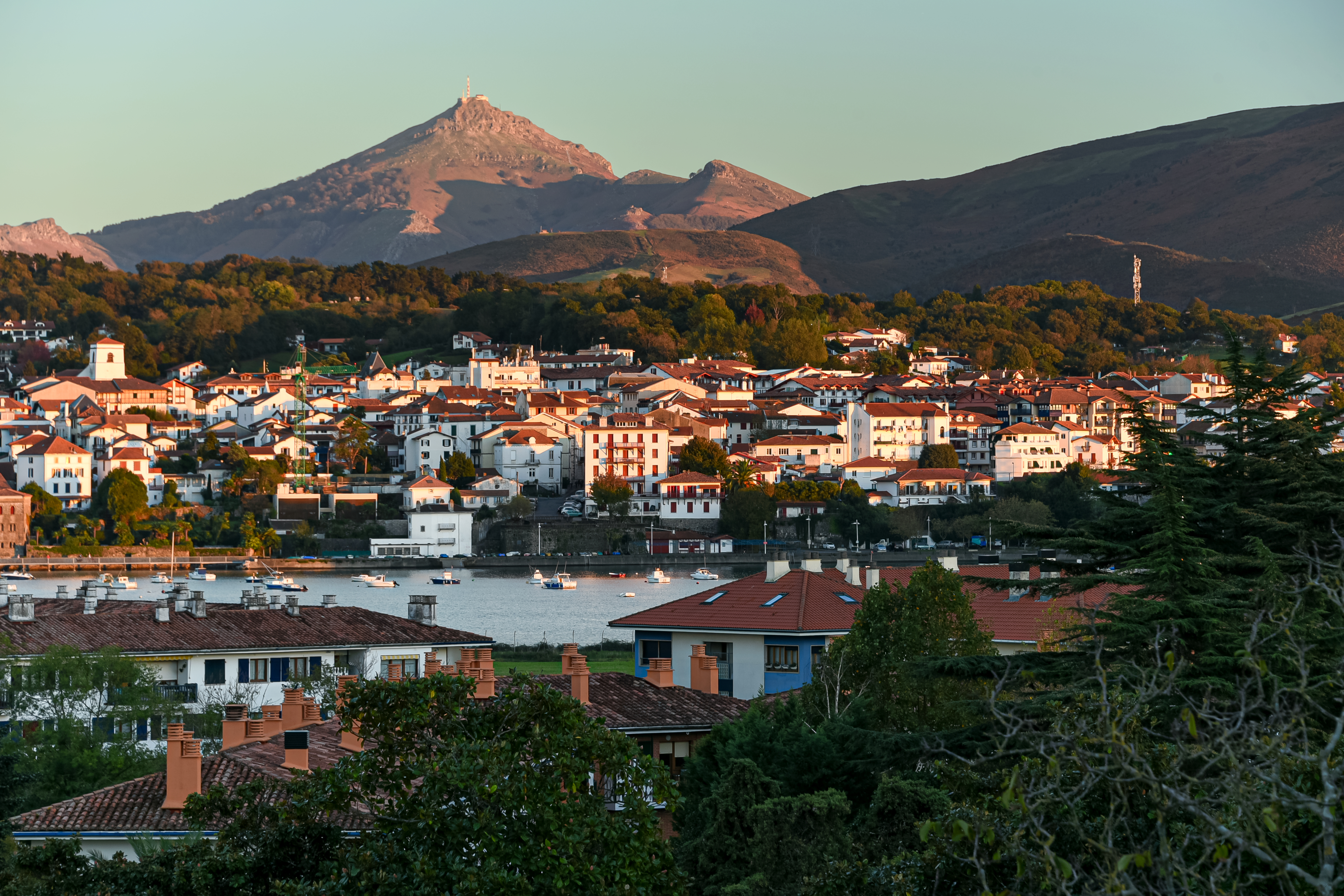
Hendaye

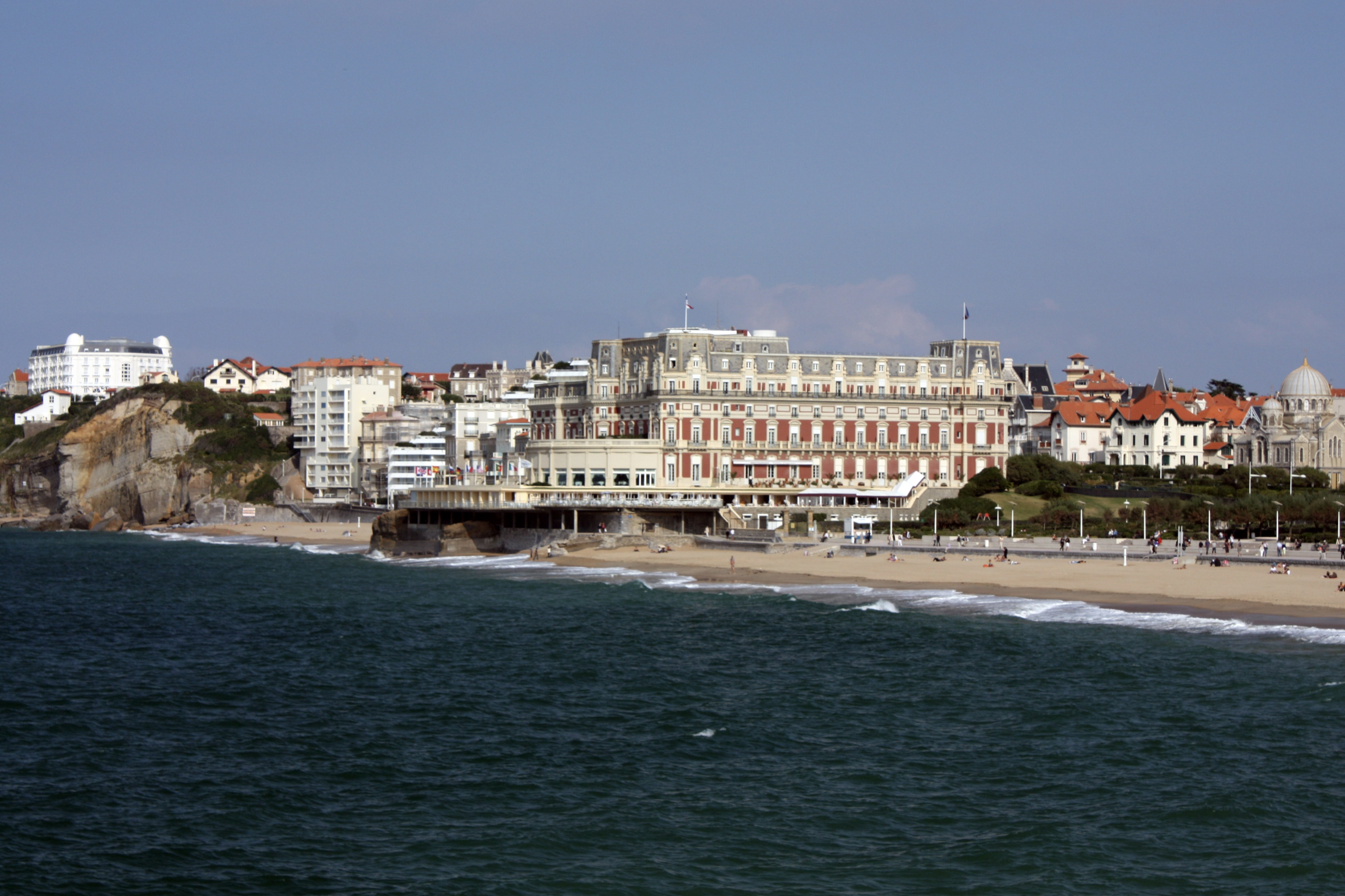
Hôtel du Palais in Biarritz

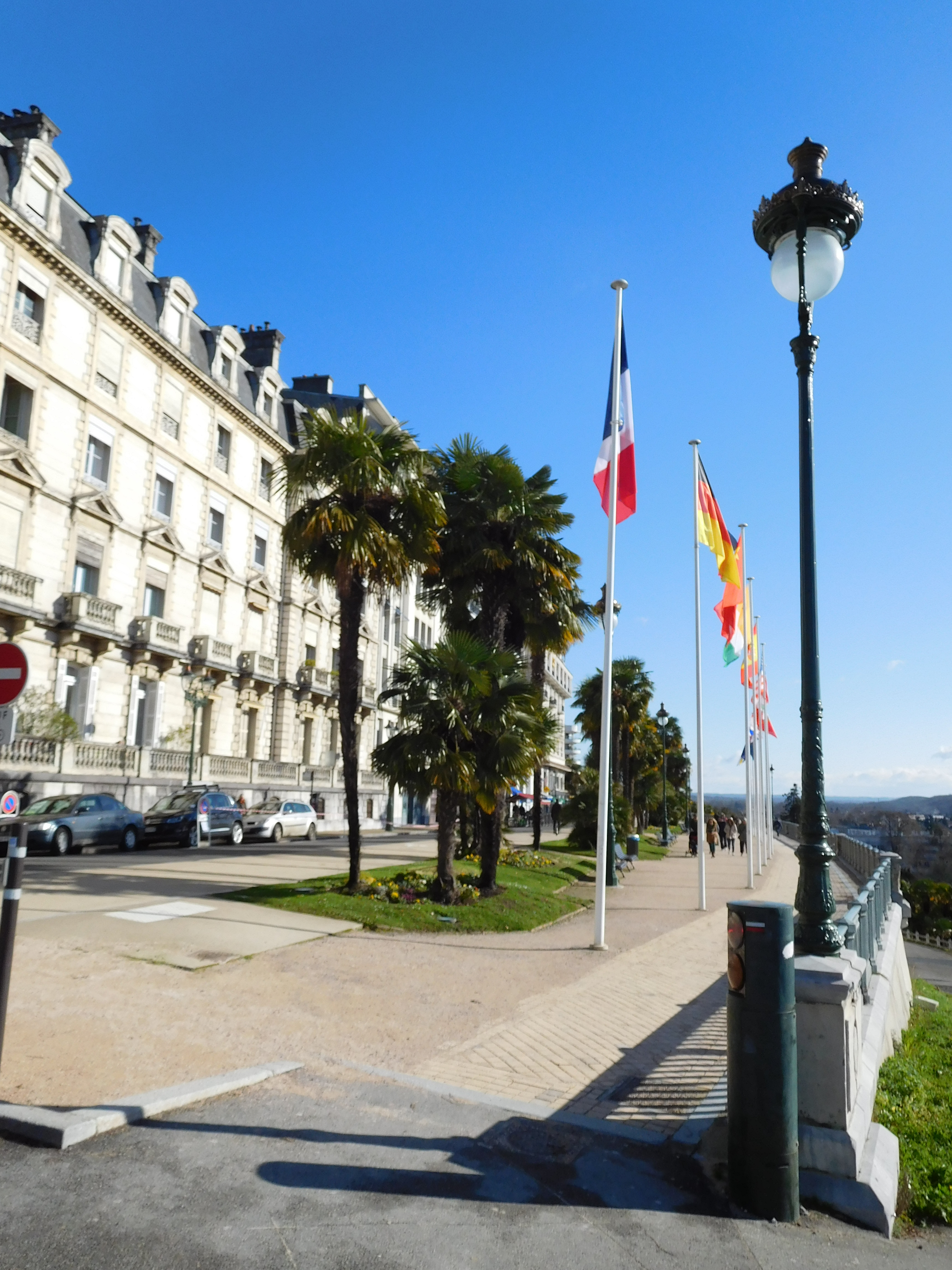
The Boulevard des Pyrénées in the town of Pau

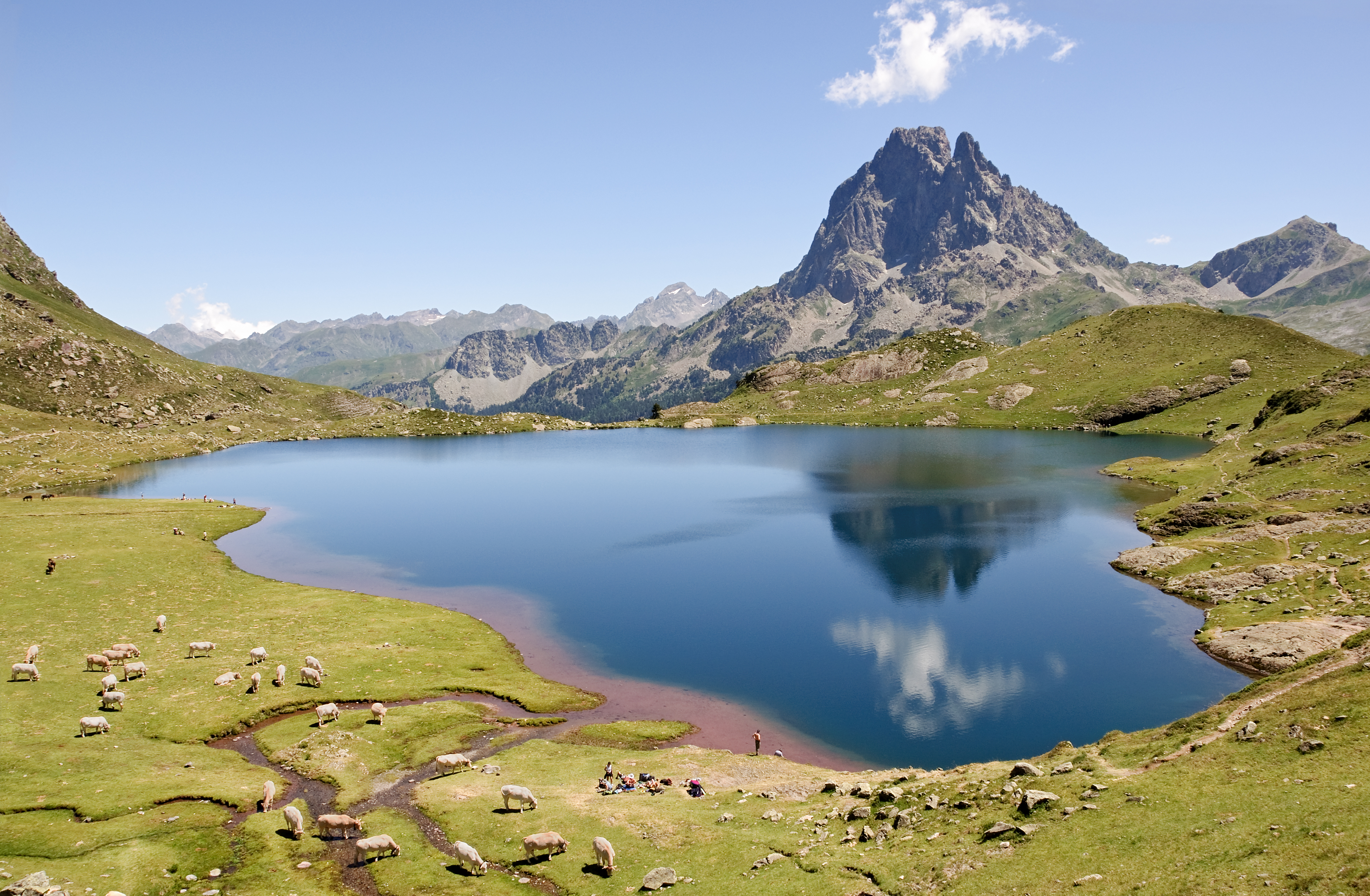
Lac Gentau

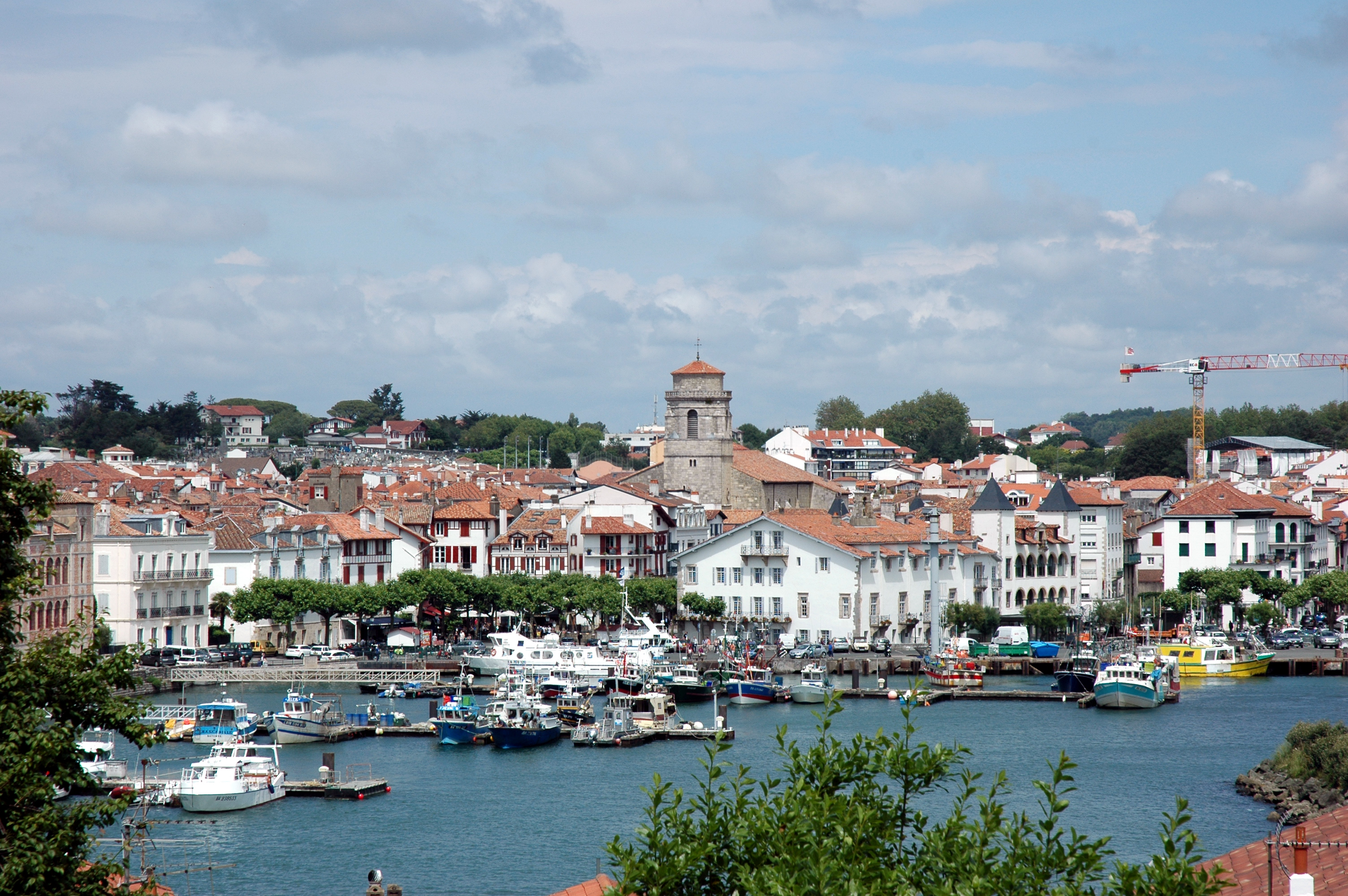
The port of Saint-Jean-de-Luz

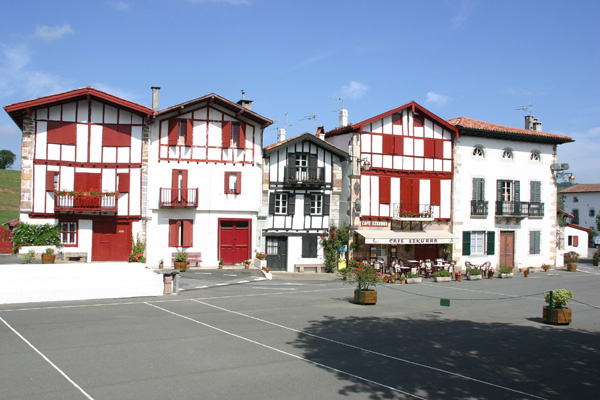
Ainhoa

== Transport ==
The department has only two airports, which are Biarritz Pays Basque Airport and Pau Pyrénées Airport. Some residents in south western parts of Pyrénées-Atlantiques around Hendaye would also use San Sebastián Airport in the neighbouring border of Basque Country which provides domestic flights to other parts of Spain. The majority of residents in the department would fairly use Bordeaux–Mérignac Airport and Toulouse-Blagnac Airport as international hubs.

== Culture ==
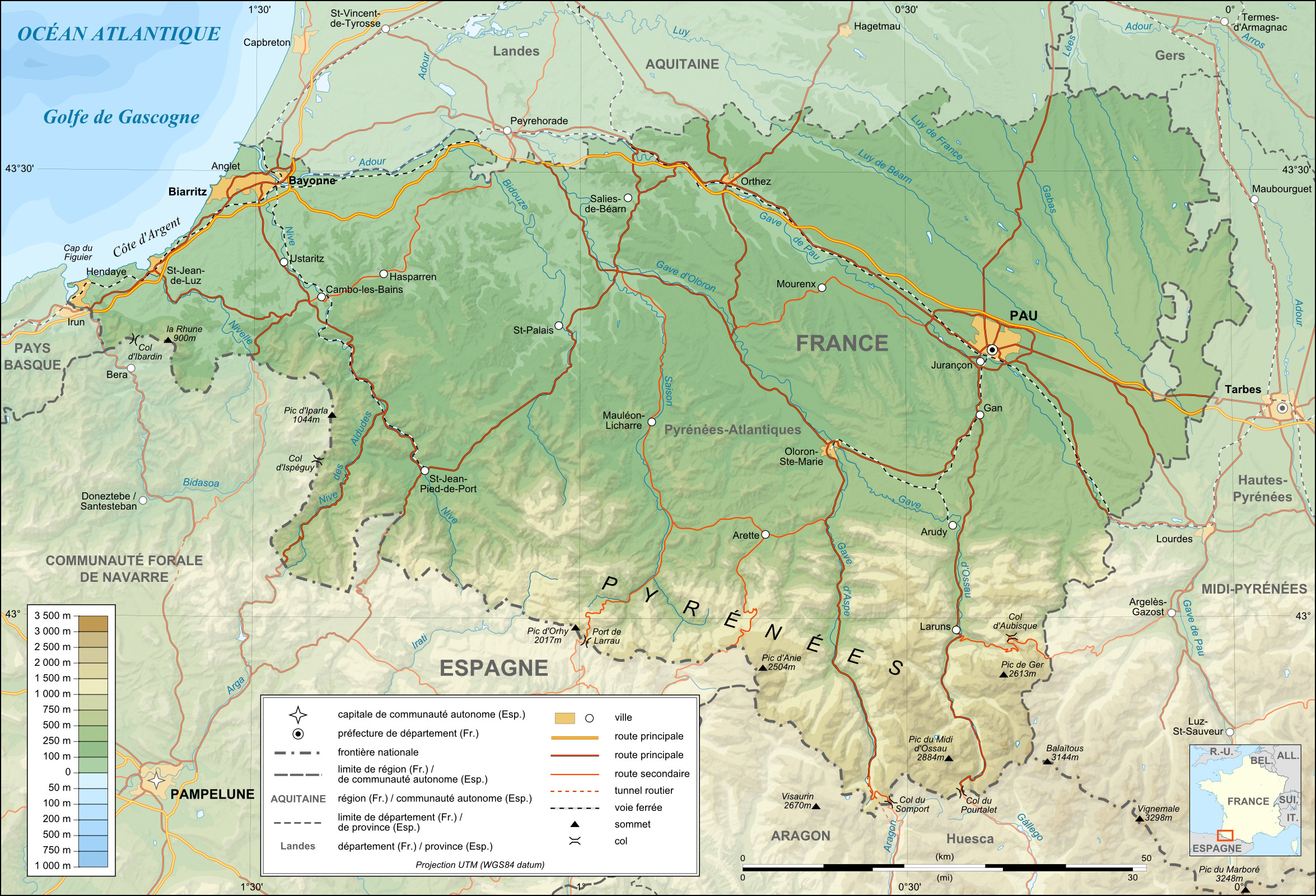
Topographic map of the Pyrénées-Atlantiques

The parts of the department that were part of Guyenne and Gascony, as well as Béarn, have a culture heavily influenced by the Basques, but clearly different identities.

Both the Gascon Bearnese variant and Basque language are indigenous to the region in their respective districts. Gascon in turn is a dialect of Occitan, formerly the main language of southern France. It is more closely related to Catalan than it is to French. Basque is a language isolate, not related to any known language. Today, French, the sole official language of the French Republic, is the predominant native language and is spoken by virtually all inhabitants.

Pyrénées-Atlantiques is also home to a number of professional sports teams, including rugby union football clubs Aviron Bayonnais, Biarritz Olympique and Section Paloise; basketball club Élan Béarnais Pau-Orthez; and association football club Pau FC.

The Pau Grand Prix, an auto race first held in 1901, has hosted the World Touring Car Championship, British Formula Three, Formula 3 Euro Series and FIA European Formula 3 Championship.

== Politics ==
Pyrénées-Atlantiques is a stronghold of the centrist Democratic Movement (MoDem). Its founder and president, François Bayrou, has served as Mayor of Pau since 2014.

=== Departmental politics ===
The Departmental Council of Pyrénées-Atlantiques has 54 seats. Its president has been Jean-Jacques Lasserre of the Democratic Movement since 2015.

=== National representation ===
In the 2024 legislative election, Pyrénées-Atlantiques elected the following members of the National Assembly:

Constituency	Member	Party
Pyrénées-Atlantiques's 1st constituency	Josy Poueyto	Democratic Movement
Pyrénées-Atlantiques's 2nd constituency	Jean-Paul Mattei	Democratic Movement
Pyrénées-Atlantiques's 3rd constituency	David Habib	Miscellaneous left
Pyrénées-Atlantiques's 4th constituency	Iñaki Echaniz	Socialist Party
Pyrénées-Atlantiques's 5th constituency	Colette Capdevielle	Socialist Party
Pyrénées-Atlantiques's 6th constituency	Peio Dufau	EH Bai

In the Senate, the department is represented by three members: Frédérique Espagnac (since 2011), Max Brisson (since 2017) and Denise Saint-Pé (since 2017).

== Heraldry ==
Coat of arms of the Pyrénées-Atlantiques

The coat of arms of Pyrénées-Atlantiques combines those of four traditional provinces:

1. Lower Navarre
2. Béarn
3. Labourd
4. Soule

== Twinning and cooperation ==
Pyrénées-Atlantiques is twinned with:

- Misiones Province, Argentina (since 2012)

== See also ==
- Arrondissements of the Pyrénées-Atlantiques department
- Cantons of the Pyrénées-Atlantiques department
- Communes of the Pyrénées-Atlantiques department
