= Results of the 2024 French legislative election in Pyrénées-Orientales =

Following the first round of the 2024 French legislative election on 30 June 2024, runoff elections in each constituency where no candidate received a vote share greater than 50 percent were scheduled for 7 July. Candidates permitted to stand in the runoff elections needed to either come in first or second place in the first round or achieve more than 12.5 percent of the votes of the entire electorate (as opposed to 12.5 percent of the vote share due to low turnout).

== Pyrénées-Orientales ==
=== 1st constituency ===
| Candidate | Party or alliance | | First round | | Second round | |
| Candidate | Party or alliance | | Votes | % | Votes | % |
|---|---|---|---|---|---|---|
| Sophie Blanc | National Rally | | 21,633 | 45.24 | 25,150 | 57.58 |
| Francis Daspe | New Popular Front | La France Insoumise | 12,184 | 25.48 | 18,525 | 42.42 |
| Christophe Euzet | Ensemble | Renaissance | 7,720 | 16.14 | | |
| Annabelle Brunet | Miscellaneous centre | The Centrists | 2,328 | 4.87 | | |
| Loïc Moszkowiez | The Republicans | | 2,092 | 4.37 | | |
| Delphine Danat | Regionalists | Independent | 790 | 1.65 | | |
| Jacques Cataldo | Reconquête | | 700 | 1.46 | | |
| Pascale Advenard | Far-left | Lutte Ouvrière | 374 | 0.78 | | |
| Total | | | 47,821 | 100.00 | 43,675 | 100.00 |
| Valid votes | | | 47,821 | 97.41 | 43,675 | 90.45 |
| Invalid votes | | | 504 | 1.03 | 1,316 | 2.73 |
| Blank votes | | | 768 | 1.56 | 3,298 | 6.83 |
| Total votes | | | 49,093 | 100.00 | 48,289 | 100.00 |
| Registered voters/turnout | | | 74,058 | 66.29 | 74,071 | 65.19 |

=== 2nd constituency ===
| Candidate | Party or alliance | | Votes | % |
|---|---|---|---|---|
| Anaïs Sabatini | National Rally | | 38,323 | 54.98 |
| Marc Medina | Miscellaneous centre | Independent | 14,257 | 20.45 |
| David Berrué | New Popular Front | The Ecologists | 13,910 | 19.96 |
| Mercedes Garcia | Regionalists | Independent | 1,337 | 1.92 |
| Brigitte Laurens | Reconquête | | 1,258 | 1.80 |
| Philippe Goiset | Far-left | Lutte Ouvrière | 618 | 0.89 |
| Total | | | 69,703 | 100.00 |
| Valid votes | | | 69,703 | 97.02 |
| Invalid votes | | | 751 | 1.05 |
| Blank votes | | | 1,393 | 1.94 |
| Total votes | | | 71,847 | 100.00 |
| Registered voters/turnout | | | 106,157 | 67.68 |

=== 3rd constituency ===
| Candidate | Party or alliance | | First round | | Second round | |
| Candidate | Party or alliance | | Votes | % | Votes | % |
|---|---|---|---|---|---|---|
| Sandrine Dogor-Such | National Rally | | 25,363 | 45.57 | 29,118 | 56.28 |
| Nathalie Cullell | New Popular Front | La France Insoumise | 15,603 | 28.03 | 22,623 | 43.72 |
| Laurence Gayte | Ensemble | Renaissance | 11,367 | 20.42 | | |
| Lucila Grau | Regionalists | Independent | 1,780 | 3.20 | | |
| Alexandre Michaut | Reconquête | | 935 | 1.68 | | |
| Anna-Maria Urroz | Far-left | Lutte Ouvrière | 612 | 1.10 | | |
| Total | | | 55,660 | 100.00 | 51,741 | 100.00 |
| Valid votes | | | 55,660 | 96.31 | 51,741 | 90.06 |
| Invalid votes | | | 717 | 1.24 | 1,611 | 2.80 |
| Blank votes | | | 1,417 | 2.45 | 4,099 | 7.13 |
| Total votes | | | 57,794 | 100.00 | 57,451 | 100.00 |
| Registered voters/turnout | | | 85,650 | 67.48 | 85,655 | 67.07 |

=== 4th constituency ===
| Candidate | Party or alliance | | First round | | Second round | |
| Candidate | Party or alliance | | Votes | % | Votes | % |
|---|---|---|---|---|---|---|
| Michèle Martinez | National Rally | | 33,159 | 47.90 | 38,045 | 58.14 |
| Julien Baraillé | New Popular Front | Socialist Party | 17,963 | 25.95 | 27,395 | 41.86 |
| Patricia Nadal | Ensemble | Renaissance | 11,454 | 16.54 | | |
| Philippe Romain | The Republicans | | 3,183 | 4.60 | | |
| Céline Davesa | Regionalists | Independent | 1,937 | 2.80 | | |
| Odile Maisonneuve | Reconquête | | 960 | 1.39 | | |
| Caroline Poupard | Far-left | Lutte Ouvrière | 575 | 0.83 | | |
| Total | | | 69,231 | 100.00 | 65,440 | 100.00 |
| Valid votes | | | 69,231 | 97.04 | 65,440 | 92.24 |
| Invalid votes | | | 810 | 1.14 | 1,604 | 2.26 |
| Blank votes | | | 1,301 | 1.82 | 3,900 | 5.50 |
| Total votes | | | 71,342 | 100.00 | 70,944 | 100.00 |
| Registered voters/turnout | | | 102,742 | 69.44 | 102,747 | 69.05 |
