= Pyrénées-Orientales's 1st constituency =

Constituency of the National Assembly of France

1st constituency of the Pyrénées-Orientales
- inline Constituency of the National Assembly of France

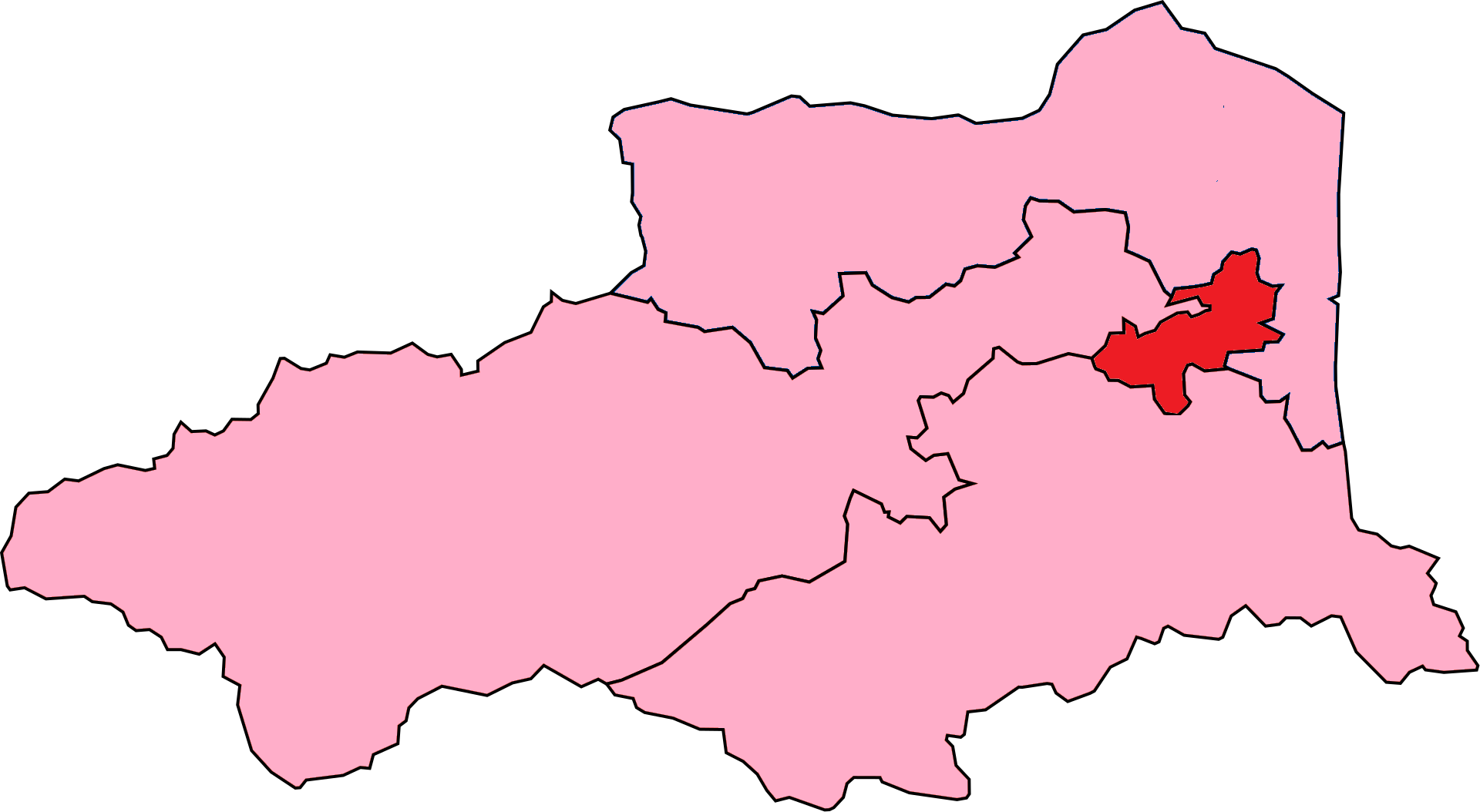
- Pyrénées-Orientales's 1st Constituency shown within the Pyrénées-Orientales

- Pyrénées-Orientales in France
- Deputy: Sophie Blanc; RN
- Department: Pyrénées-Orientales
- Cantons: (pre-2015) Perpignan III, Perpignan IV, Perpignan V, Perpignan VII, Perpignan IX, Toulouges
- Registered voters: 70972

The 1st constituency of the Pyrénées-Orientales (French: Première circonscription des Pyrénées-Orientales) is a French legislative constituency in the Pyrénées-Orientales département. Like the other 576 French constituencies, it elects one MP using the two-round system, with a run-off if no candidate receives over 50% of the vote in the first round.

== Description ==
The 1st constituency of Pyrénées-Orientales mainly consists of the majority Perpignan, which is shared with Pyrénées-Orientales's 3rd constituency and Pyrénées-Orientales's 2nd constituency. The seat also includes the town of Toulouges just to the west of the city.

The constituency has vacillated between left and right, however in 2017 the voters opted for centrist En Marche! over the far right National Front in the second round. The Republicans trailed in 3rd in the 1st round and there was no candidate from the PSdespite them winning the seat in the previous election.

== Assembly Members ==
Election	Member	Party
1988	Claude Barate	RPR
1993	Claude Barate	RPR
1997	Jean Vila	PCF
2002	Daniel Mach	UMP
2007	Daniel Mach	UMP
2012	Jacques Cresta	PS
2017	Romain Grau	LREM
2022	Sophie Blanc	NR

== Election results ==
=== 2024 ===
Candidate	Party	Alliance	First round		Second round	
Candidate	Party	Alliance	Votes	%	Votes	%
Sophie Blanc	RN		21,633	45.24	25,150	57.58
Francis Daspe	LFI	NFP	12,184	25.48	18,525	42.42
Christophe Euzet	REN	Ensemble	7,720	16.14		
Annabelle Brunet	LC	DVC	2,328	4.87		
Loïc Moszkowiez	LR	Ensemble	2,092	4.37		
Delphine Danat	Ind	Reg	790	1.65		
Jacques Cataldo	R!		700	1.46		
Pascale Advenard	LO		374	0.78		
Valid votes			47,821	97.41	43,675	90.45
Blank votes			768	1.56	3,298	6.83
Null votes			504	1.03	1,316	2.73
Turnout			49,093	66.29	48,289	65.19
Abstentions			24,965	33.71	25,782	34.81
Registered voters			74,058		74.071	
Result			RN HOLD			

=== 2022 ===
Legislative Election 2022: Pyrénées-Orientales's 1st constituency
Party	Candidate	Votes	%	±%
RN	Sophie Blanc	10,162	31.36	+11.10
LREM (Ensemble)	Romain Grau	7,952	24.54	-7.21
LFI (NUPÉS)	Francis Daspe	7,659	23.63	+7.77
REC	Georges-Henri Chambaud	1,811	5.59	N/A
LR (UDC)	Christine Gavaldal Moulenat	1,799	5.55	−13.81
DIV	Rite Peix	667	2.06	N/A
Others	N/A	2,356		
Turnout		32,406	45.62	−1.40
2nd round result
RN	Sophie Blanc	15,859	53.87	+11.08
LREM (Ensemble)	Romain Grau	13,583	46.13	−11.08
Turnout		29,442	44.44	+3.78
RN gain from LREM				

=== 2017 ===
Results of the 11 June and 18 June 2017 French National Assembly election in Pyrénées-Orientale’s 1st Constituency
Candidate	Party		1st round		2nd round	
Candidate	Party		Votes	%	Votes	%
Romain Grau	La République En Marche!	LREM	10,354	31.75	14,720	57.21
Alexandre Bolo	National Front	FN	6,606	20.26	11,008	42.79
Daniel Mach	The Republicans	LR	6,312	19.36		
Alain Mih	La France Insoumise	FI	3,771	11.56		
Jean Codognès	Miscellaneous Left	DVG	1,867	5.73		
Françoise Fiter	Communist Party	PCF	1,402	4.30		
Fabienne Meyer	Regionalist	REG	957	2.93		
Philippe Symphorien	Debout la France	DLF	398	1.22		
Emmanuel Cousty	Independent	DIV	373	1.14		
Pascale Advenard	Far Left	EXG	246	0.75		
Nicolas Perez	Independent	DIV	181	0.56		
Lionel Monaco	Miscellaneous Left	DVG	74	0.23		
Anthony Rhighi	Independent	DIV	68	0.21		
Total			32,609	100%	25,728	100%
Registered voters			70,970		70,972	
Blank/Void ballots			761	2.28%	3,128	10.84%
Turnout			33,370	47.02%	28,856	40.66%
Abstentions			37,600	52.98%	42,116	59.34%
Result					REM GAIN FROM PS	

=== 2012 ===
Results of the 10 June and 17 June 2012 French National Assembly election in Pyrénées-Orientale’s 1st Constituency
Candidate	Party		1st round		2nd round	
Candidate	Party		Votes	%	Votes	%
Daniel Mach	Union for a Popular Movement	UMP	11,097	28.19	13,464	33.82
Jacques Cresta	Socialist Party	PS	9,692	24.62	17,098	42.95
Louis Aliot	National Front	FN	9,496	24.13	9,251	23.24
Jean Vila	Left Front	FG	6,434	16.35		
Agnès Langevine	Europe Ecology-The Greens	EELV	682	1.73		
Christine Espert	The Centre for France	CEN	505	1.28		
Atika El Bourimi	Miscellaneous Left	DVG	443	1.13		
Jean-Paul Tomas	Ecologist	ECO	329	0.84		
Pierre Verdier	Far Right	EXD	171	0.43		
Laurent Gomez	Other	AUT	128	0.33		
Stéphanie Font	Far Left	EXG	124	0.32		
Hélène Sarraseca	Ecologist	ECO	118	0.30		
Pascale Advenard	Far Left	EXG	98	0.25		
Annie Marciniak	Other	AUT	41	0.10		
Roymond Faura	Miscellaneous Left	DVG	1	0.00		
Michael Morant	Ecologist	ECO	0	0.00		
Total			39,359	100%	39,813	100%
Registered voters			67,612		67,600	
Blank/Void ballots			523	1.31%	910	2.23%
Turnout			39,882	58.99%	40,723	60.24%
Abstentions			27,730	41.01%	26,877	39.76%
Result					PS GAIN FROM UMP	

=== 2007 ===
Results of the 10 June and 17 June 2007 French National Assembly election in Pyrénées-Orientale’s 1st Constituency
Candidate	Party		1st round		2nd round	
Candidate	Party		Votes	%	Votes	%
Daniel Mach	Union for a Presidential Majority	UMP	17,941	46.56	21,410	56.98
Jean Vila	Communist Party	PCF	6,335	16.44	16,167	43.02
Martine Joseph	Socialist Party	PS	5,701	14.80		
Louis Aliot	National Front	FN	6.74	2,599		
Chantal Gombert	UDF-Democratic Movement	UDF-MoDem	2,360	6.12		
Guillem Vaulato	Far Left	EXG	701	1.82		
Nicole Drickx	The Greens	LV	606	1.57		
Virginie Barre	Regionalist	REG	576	1.49		
Christine Gonzalez	Movement for France	MPF	443	1.15		
Yves Castanet	Ecologist	ECO	399	1.04		
Monique Juanola	Regionalist	REG	245	0.64		
Pascale Advenard	Far Left	EXG	238	0.62		
Ida Fleury	Far Right	EXD	215	0.56		
Francis Meuley	Independent	DIV	172	0.45		
Annie Marciniak	Independent	DIV	2	0.01		
Total			38,533	100%	37,577	100%
Registered voters			66,218		66,218	
Blank/Void ballots			659	1.68%	1,356	3.48%
Turnout			39,192	59.19%	38,933	58.80%
Abstentions			27,026	40.81%	27,285	41.20%
Result					UMP HOLD	

=== 2002 ===
Results of the 9 June and 16 June 2002 French National Assembly election in Pyrénées-Orientale’s 1st Constituency
Candidate	Party		1st round		2nd round	
Candidate	Party		Votes	%	Votes	%
Daniel Mach	Union for a Presidential Majority	UMP	13,224	35.71	19,440	55.74
Jean Vila	Communist Party	PCF	11,920	32.19	15,437	44.26
Louis Aliot	National Front	FN	7,209	19.47		
J. Claude Kaiser	Rally for France	RFP	816	2.20		
Claudine Coste	Revolutionary Communist League	LCR	688	1.86		
François Feillard	Independent	DIV	544	1.47		
Alain Dosseur Le	Republican Pole	PR	467	1.26		
Pierre Gonzalez	Hunting, Fishing, Nature and Traditions	CPNT	464	1.25		
Caroline Poupard	Workers' Struggle	LO	317	0.86		
Michel Dallee	National Republican Movement	MNR	302	0.82		
Christine Gonzalez	Movement for France	MPF	280	0.76		
Isabelle Duran	Regionalist	REG	246	0.66		
Jacques Cros	Independent	DIV	216	0.58		
Gauderique Delcasso	Ecologist	ECO	206	0.56		
Louis Pomata	Independent	DIV	129	0.35		
Alain Cavaliere	Miscellaneous Right	DVD	0	0.00		
Jacques Comas	Independent	DIV	0	0.00		
Nicole Sabiols	Socialist Party	PS	0	0.00		
Total			37,028	100%	34,877	100%
Registered voters			58,840		58,838	
Blank/Void ballots			899	2.37%	1,693	4.63%
Turnout			37,927	64.46%	36,570	62.15%
Abstentions			20,913	35.54%	22,268	37.85%
Result					UMP GAIN FROM PCF	
