= François Calvet =

French politician (born 1953)

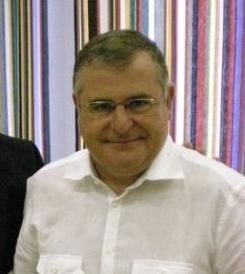

Member of the French Senate for Pyrénées-Orientales
- In office 1 October 2011 – 2 October 2023
- Succeeded by: Lauriane Josende

Member of the National Assembly for Pyrénées-Orientales's 3rd constituency
- In office 2002–2011
- Preceded by: Christian Bourquin
- Succeeded by: Ségolène Neuville

Personal details
- Born: 1 April 1953 (age 73) Perpignan, France
- Party: The Republicans

François Calvet (born 1 April 1953 in Perpignan) is a French politician, a member of the National Assembly. He represents the Pyrénées-Orientales department, and is a member of the Union for a Popular Movement. On 25 September 2011 he was elected senator of the Pyrénées-Orientales and therefore leaves the National Assembly. His deputy is Jean-Pierre Romero, mayor of Port-Vendres. He is a member of the Study Group on the question of Tibet of National Assembly.

== Biography ==
Elected Regional Council of Languedoc-Roussillon in 1992, François Calvet was elected UDF-PR deputy for the 3rd constituency of the Pyrénées-Orientales in March 1993. A few months later, he appeared on the RPR-UDF list in the Perpignan municipal by-election, which saw the victory of UDF dissident Jean-Paul Alduy. He was re-elected to the Regional Council in 1998 and served as vice-president until 2002, when he returned to being a simple councilor.

He was elected mayor of Le Soler in 1995 and has been re-elected ever since (65.58% of the votes cast in the first round in March 2008). Defeated in the 1997 legislative elections by Christian Bourquin, he devoted himself to his local mandates (mayor and vice-president of the regional council in 1998). He took his revenge on June 16, 2002, and joined the UMP group in the National Assembly. Due to the accumulation of mandates, he had to leave the regional council.

Running for re-election as a UMP deputy for the 13th legislature (2007-2012), he was re-elected with 51.94% of the vote against his long-standing Socialist rival, Christian Bourquin. On January 30, 2008, he was appointed rapporteur for the bill on archives and the organic bill amending Ordinance No. 58-1067 of November 7, 1958, on the organic law on the Constitutional Council and its archives.

He is a member of the National Assembly (France) study group on the question of Tibet.

On September 25, 2011, he was elected senator for the Pyrénées-Orientales department and therefore left the National Assembly. His deputy is Jean-Pierre Romero, mayor of Port-Vendres. On September 24, 2017, he was re-elected in the first round with lawyer Lauriane Josende as his deputy.

He sponsored Laurent Wauquiez for the 2017 Republican Party convention, during which the party president was elected.

On October 16, 2017, he resigned from his position as mayor of Le Soler following the implementation of the new law on the non-accumulation of mandates. He also had to give up his position as first vice-president of the Perpignan urban community .

He will not be running for re-election in the 2023 Senate elections.
