= Jacques Cresta =

French politician (1955–2022)

Member of the French National Assembly
- In office 20 June 2012 – 20 June 2017
- Preceded by: Daniel Mach
- Succeeded by: Romain Grau
- Constituency: Pyrénées-Orientales's 1st constituency

Member of the Regional Council of Occitania
- In office 4 January 2016 – 27 June 2021
- President: Carole Delga

Personal details
- Born: 16 February 1955 Algiers, French Algeria
- Died: 12 October 2022 (aged 67) Perpignan, France
- Party: Socialist Party; DVG
- Education: Lycée François-Arago
- Alma mater: University of Perpignan

Jacques Cresta (16 February 1955 – 12 October 2022) was a French politician of the Socialist Party (PS).

== Life and career ==
Cresta was born in Algiers, French Algeria on 16 February 1955 to a father who was a banker and a stay-at-home mother. In 1962, his family moved to Lyon, then Compiègne, and finally settled in Perpignan in 1965. He attended secondary school at the Lycée François-Arago, where he met his future wife, Josy, with whom he had two daughters. He studied economics at the University of Perpignan. He then worked for the Caisse d'allocations familiales.

Cresta joined the Socialist Party in 1980, where he rapidly climbed the ladder in roles and responsibilities. In 2002, he was elected First Secretary of the party's Catalan federation, where he was re-elected thrice. The following year, he was elected to the municipal council of Cabestany. In 2007, he was expelled from the PS for his support of Georges Frêche, but later re-joined the party.

In 2010, he was elected to the Regional Council of Languedoc-Roussillon. In 2012, he was elected to the National Assembly in Pyrénées-Orientales's 1st constituency, where he sat on the Committee on Foreign Affairs and European Affairs. He was a candidate for mayor of Perpignan in 2014, when he won only 11.87% of the vote and did not participate in the second round so that the Union for a Popular Movement candidate could gain more votes against the National Front candidate.

In the 2017 French presidential election, Cresta announced his support for Emmanuel Macron and did not participate in that year's legislative election.

Jacques Cresta died following a long illness in Perpignan, on 12 October 2022, at the age of 67.
