= Reindustrialize Summit =

Conference advocating for reindustrialization

- Status: Active
- Genre: Manufacturing conference
- Frequency: Annually
- Locations: Detroit, Michigan
- Country: United States
- Years active: 1–2 years
- Inaugurated: June 25, 2024
- Founders: Aaron Slodov; Falon Donohue; Austin Bishop; Gregory Bernstein
- Most recent: July 16–17, 2025
- Area: North America
- Website: reindustrialize.com

The Reindustrialize Summit is an annual right-wing conference held in Detroit, Michigan.

== History ==
The first Reindustrialize Summit was held June 25–26, 2024 at Newlab at Michigan Central in Detroit. The idea emerged from informal discussions following a factory tour at Atomic Industries in March 2024. The summit was founded by Aaron Slodov, Falon Donohue, Austin Bishop, and Gregory Bernstein.

A second edition took place July 16–17, 2025 at Hudson's Detroit.

== Media coverage ==
U.S. Trade Representative Jamieson Greer spoke at the 2025 summit; his remarks on trade policy and manufacturing were covered by Reuters and the Financial Times. Business Insider and Defense One reported on defense manufacturing themes and company announcements at the event.

The Free Press described the conference as bringing together investors, manufacturers, and government officials around industrial capacity, national security, and economic policy.

== See also ==
- Manufacturing in the United States
- Reindustrialization
- Industrial policy
