= 2017 Marine Le Pen presidential campaign =

French political campaign

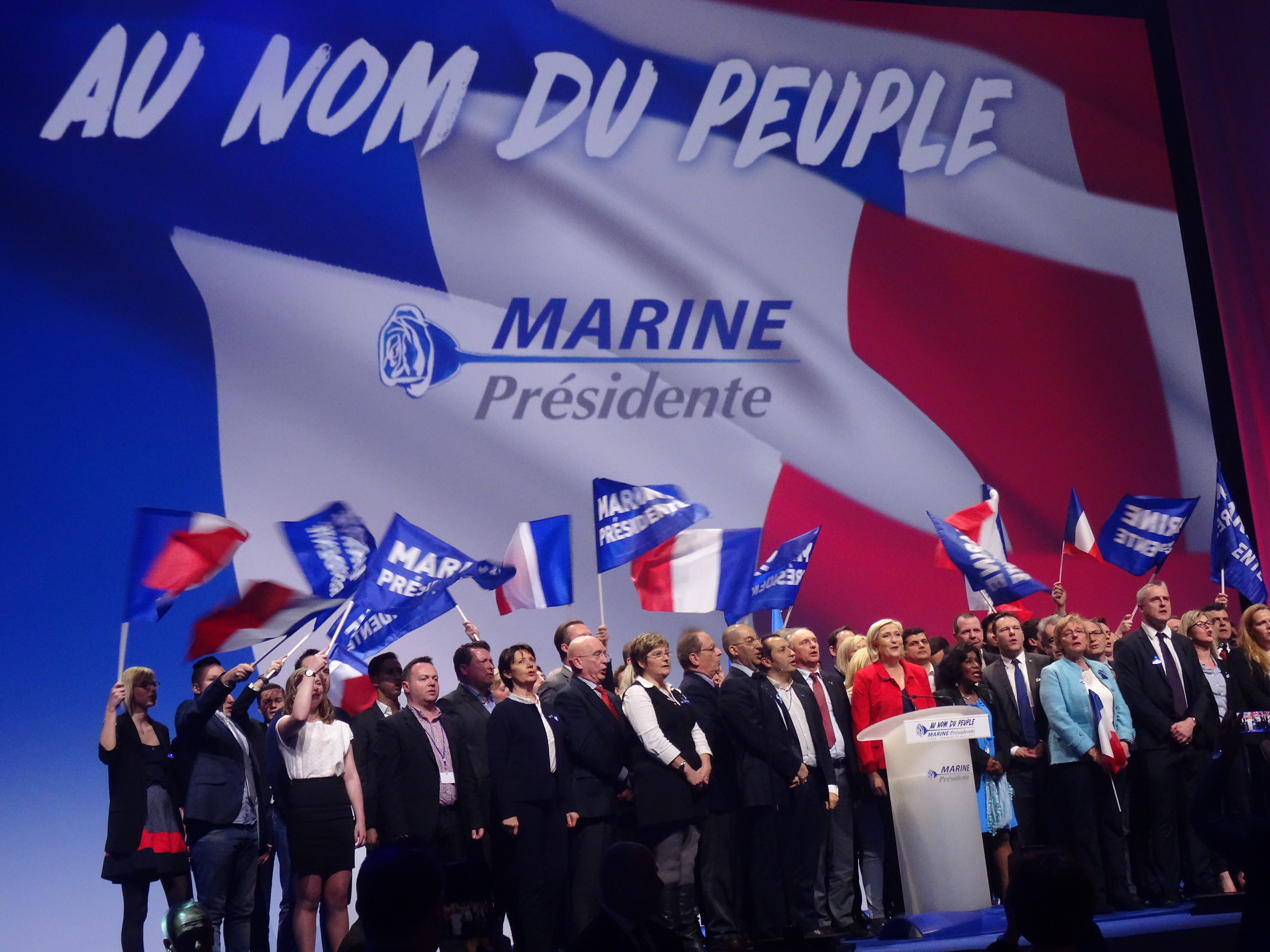
Marine Le Pen during her presidential campaign in Lille, on 26 March 2017.

Marine Le Pen, as leader of the National Front ran for President of France in the 2017 French presidential election, receiving 21.30% of the vote in the first round, and 33.90% in the second round, losing to Emmanuel Macron of La République En Marche!.

== Background ==
Le Pen ran an unsuccessful campaign in 2012.

== Campaign ==
Le Pen launched her presidential campaign on 5 February 2017. In her speech, she condemned Radical Islamism and Globalization, and outlined her 144 campaign commitments as part of the policy platform. Her campaign found particular resonance among members of the working class, who were upset with France's unemployment rate and were drawn to Le Pen's opposition to elitism, immigration, and the European Union.

On April 29, in advance of the second-round vote, Le Pen announced that if elected, she would select Nicolas Dupont-Aignan for her Prime Minister; Dupont-Aignan had received almost five percent of the vote in the first-round vote and expressed views on globalization similar to Le Pen's own.

== Policies ==
Her policies included; lowering the retirement age, halting free trade agreements and reindustrialization in France.

== See also ==
- 2012 Marine Le Pen presidential campaign
