= 2012 Marine Le Pen presidential campaign =

French political campaign

Marine Le Pen — Élysée 2012
- Campaign: 2012 French presidential election
- Candidate: Marine Le Pen
- Affiliation: National Front
- Key people: Florian Philippot (Strategic director); Louis Aliot (Operational director); Gilbert Collard (Support committee)
- Slogan(s): The voice of people, the spirit of France

Website
- 2012 presidential campaign's website

Marine Le Pen, president of the National Front from 2011 to 2022, ran in the 2012 French presidential election, garnering 17.90% of electorate placing her third in the balloting that was conducted on April 22, 2012.

== Campaign trail ==
=== Announcement and launching ===
During the 2010 internal campaign for the FN leadership, Marine Le Pen explained why the leadership of the party and the candidature for the presidential election must not be dissociated: thus the next FN leader will run in the 2012 presidential election.

On 16 May 2011, her presidential candidacy was unanimously validated by the FN Executive Committee.

On 10 and 11 September 2011, she made her political comeback with the title "the voice of people, the spirit of France" in the convention center of Acropolis in Nice. Her political comeback, which was concluded by a closing speech of seventy minutes, prefigured the launching of her presidential campaign.

During a press conference held in Nanterre on 6 October 2011, she officially unveiled the line-up of her presidential campaign team.

=== Issues and statements ===
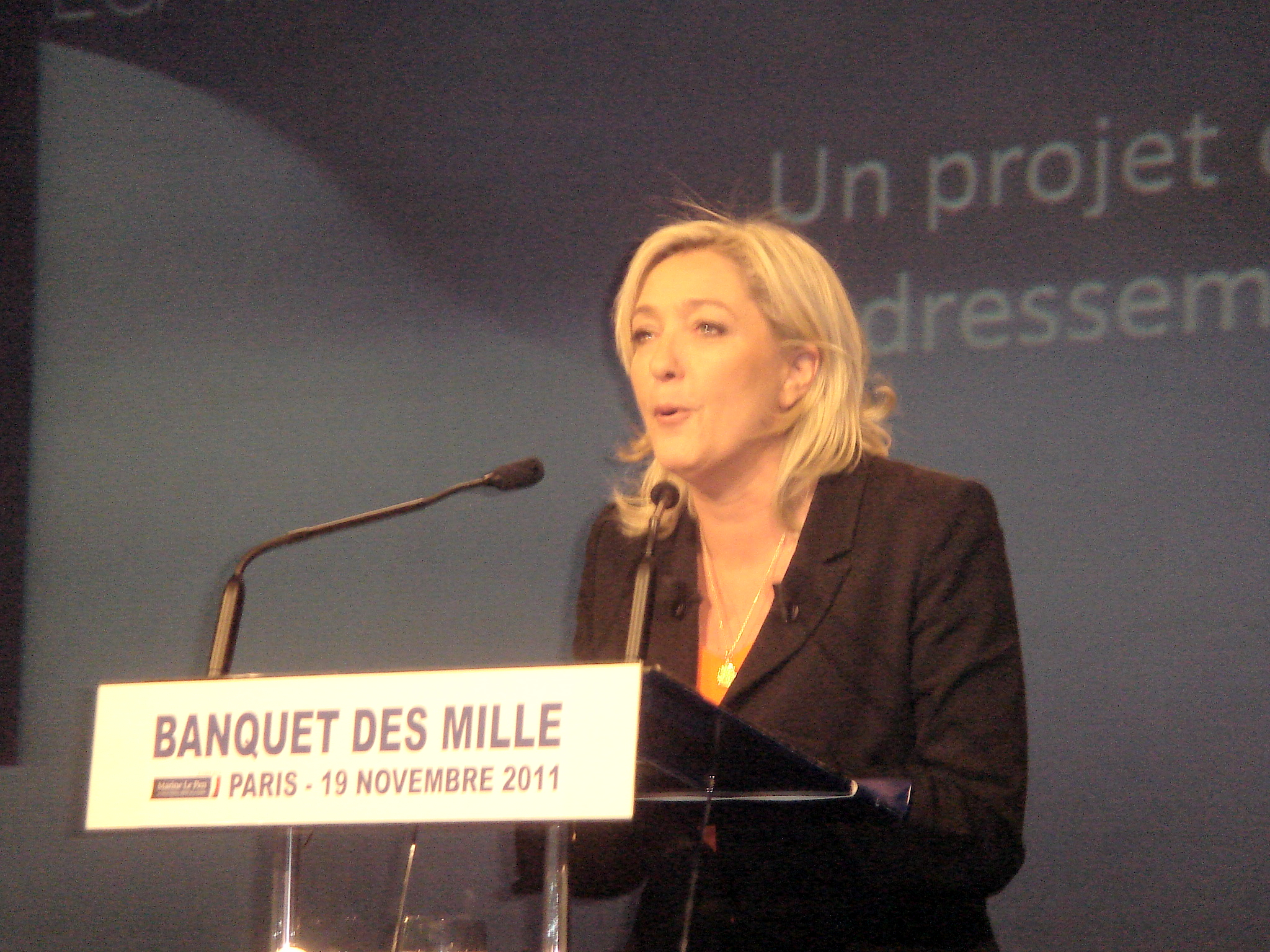
On 19 November 2011, Marine Le Pen presented in Paris the main thematic issues of her presidential project

The main topics of her presidential campaign are: economy and social, immigration and security, reindustrialisation and "strong state," fight against corruption and public morality, education and culture, family and health, international politics. Marine Le Pen and her advisers regularly hold thematic press conferences and interventions on varied topical issues.

On 19 November 2011, she espoused the main thematic issues of her presidential project: sovereign people and democracy, Europe, reindustrialization and strong state, family and education, immigration and assimilation versus communitarianism, geopolitics and international politics. During a press conference held on 12 January 2012, she presented in detail the assessment of her presidential project and a plan of debt paydown of France.

During a press conference held on 1 February 2012, she presented an outline of her presidential project for the overseas departments and territories of France.

=== Meetings and travels ===
==== France ====
On 17 September 2011, 1,200 people from Western France have taken part in her first meeting held in a castle in Vaiges, Mayenne.

On 21 September 2011, she visited during two hours the Rungis International Market, where she met workers and professionals disillusioned with Nicolas Sarkozy's politics. On that very day, she met farmers in Fosses, Val-d'Oise and held a press conference about agricultural issues.

On 17 October 2011, she held a press conference in front of the Dexia headquarters in La Défense. On 19 October 2011, she visited in Paris the 2011 Milipol, a security technology sales exhibition.

On 5 January 2012, she presented her wishes to the press.

On 11 December 2011, she held her first presidential meeting in Metz, Moselle, Lorraine. From early January 2012, she held weekly meetings in major French cities: Saint-Denis, Rouen Bordeaux, Perpignan, Toulouse.

==== Italy ====
In October 2011, Marine Le Pen visited Italy for three days. On 20 October 2011, she had dinner in Verona with forty local contractors including Daniela Santanchè, undersecretary in charge of the implementation of the programme in the Berlusconi IV Cabinet. On 21 October 2011, she met in Verona municipal representatives members of The Right. Later on that very day, she discussed at the Milan Stock Exchange topical issues (Arab Spring, immigration, European Union) with Daniela Santanchè. On 22 October 2011, she signed in Rome the Italian translation of her autobiography À contre flots for the assistance gathered in the Ferrajoli palace.

== Endorsements ==
A lawyer, Gilbert Collard rallied to her presidential candidacy and accepted the presidency of her support committee.

During the convention in Nice on 10 September 2011, she has received the support of Paul-Marie Coûteaux, a former souverainiste MEP. A former general director of the Renseignements Généraux, Yves Bertrand wrote an expression of sympathy in a French magazine. Although Bertrand said that "Marine Le Pen is respectable, republican and friendly", he will not join her support committee. Other personalities could further support her candidacy and join her presidential committee. Le Pen also received support from actress Brigitte Bardot.

On 2 February 2012, Marine Le Pen's support committee was officially presented during a press conference in Paris.

== See also ==
- Opinion polling for the French presidential election, 2012
- Marine Le Pen presidential campaign, 2017

== See also ==
- 2017 Marine Le Pen presidential campaign
