= Sandrine Dogor-Such =

French politician

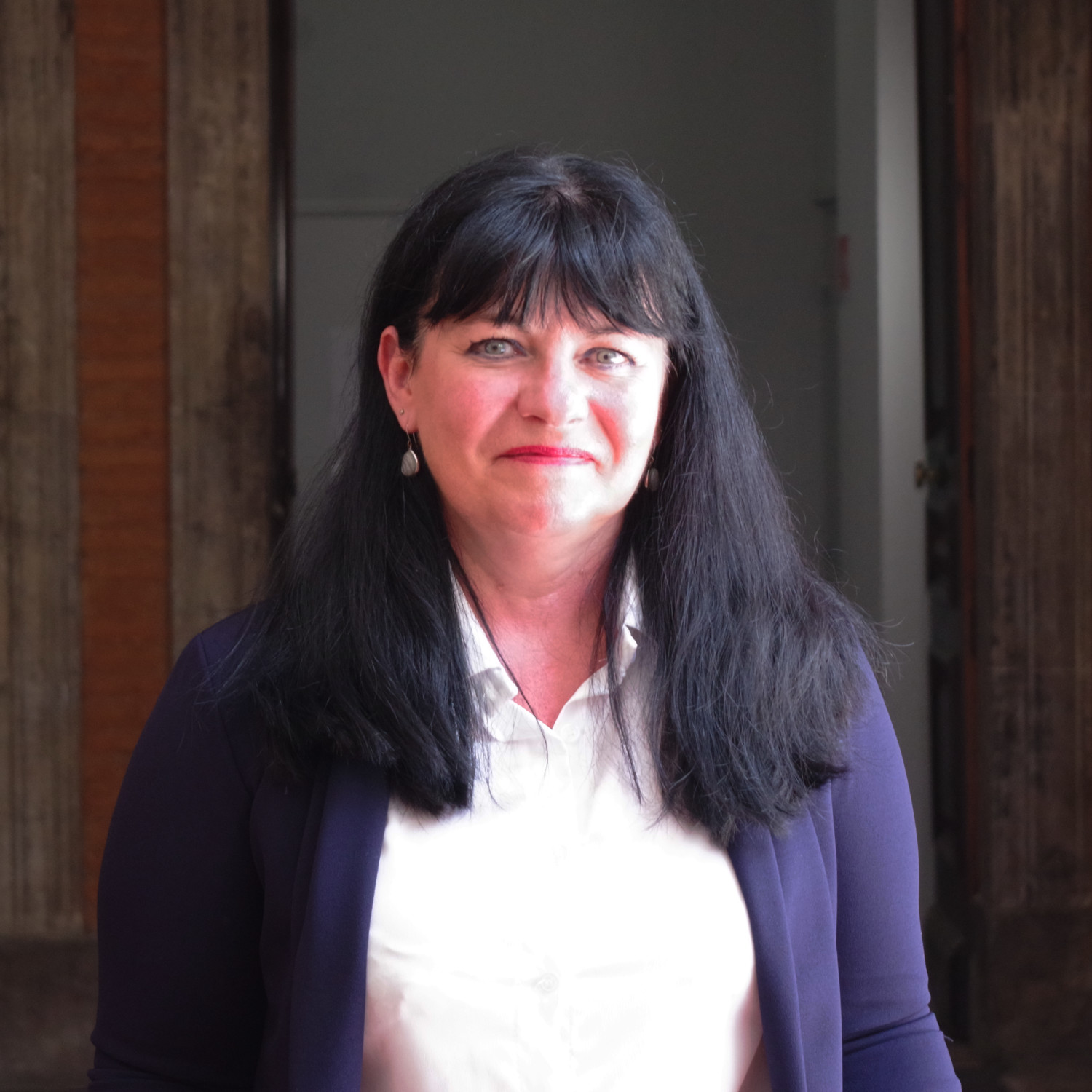

Member of the National Assembly for Pyrénées-Orientales's 3rd constituency
- Incumbent
- Assumed office 22 June 2022
- Preceded by: Laurence Gayte

Personal details
- Born: 8 November 1970 (age 55) Indre-et-Loire, France
- Party: National Rally

Sandrine Dogor-Such (born 8 November 1970) is a French politician of the National Rally who has been a Member of the National Assembly for Pyrénées-Orientales's 3rd constituency since 2022.

She is also one of the deputy mayors of Perpignan.

Dogor-Such worked for a pharmaceuticals company before entering politics. She contested Pyrénées-Orientales's 3rd constituency during the 2017 French legislative election, but lost to Laurence Gayte of LREM. During the 2022 French legislative election, she was selected to run in the same constituency and took the seat in the second round, defeating Natalie Cullell of La France insoumise. During her campaign, she voiced opposition to mandatory vaccination policies in the workplace and supported reintegrating healthcare workers who were removed from their jobs over vaccine disputes.
