= Catherine Pujol =

French politician

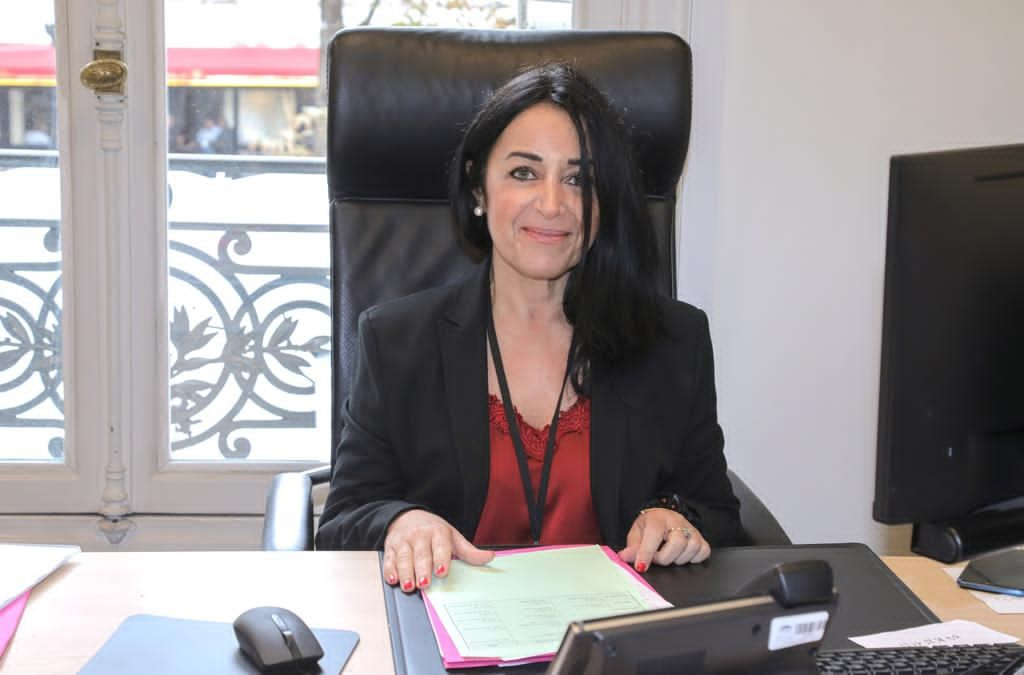

Member of the National Assembly for Pyrénées-Orientales's 2nd constituency
- In office 3 August 2020 – 21 June 2022
- Preceded by: Louis Aliot
- Succeeded by: Anaïs Sabatini

Personal details
- Born: 6 April 1960 (age 64); Perpignan, Pyrénées-Orientales, Occitanie France
- Political party: National Rally

Catherine Pujol (born 6 April 1960) is a French politician from National Rally who represented Pyrénées-Orientales's 2nd constituency in the National Assembly from 2020 to 2022.

== Political career ==
At the 2017 French legislative election, Pujol was the substitute candidate for Louis Aliot in Pyrénées-Orientales's 2nd constituency. Pujol became a member of the National Assembly following Aliot's election as mayor of Perpignan due to the dual mandate.

She did not seek re-election in the 2022 French legislative election.
