= Gilles d'Ettore =

French politician (born 1968)

Mayor of Agde
- In office 19 March 2001 – 31 May 2024
- Preceded by: Régis Passerieux
- Succeeded by: Sébastien Frey

Member of the National Assembly for Hérault's 7th constituency
- In office 2007–2012
- Preceded by: François Liberti
- Succeeded by: Sébastien Denaja

Personal details
- Born: 23 May 1968 (age 58) Agde, Hérault, France
- Party: The Republicans
- Education: University of Montpellier

Gilles d'Ettore (born 23 May 1968) is a French politician, member of The Republicans and deputy from 2007 to 2012. Mayor of Agde from 2001 and chairman of the Communauté d'agglomération Hérault Méditerranée since its creation in January 2003, he resigned from his elective mandates on 31 May 2024 following his indictment for corruption.
