= Sébastien Denaja =

French politician (born 1979)

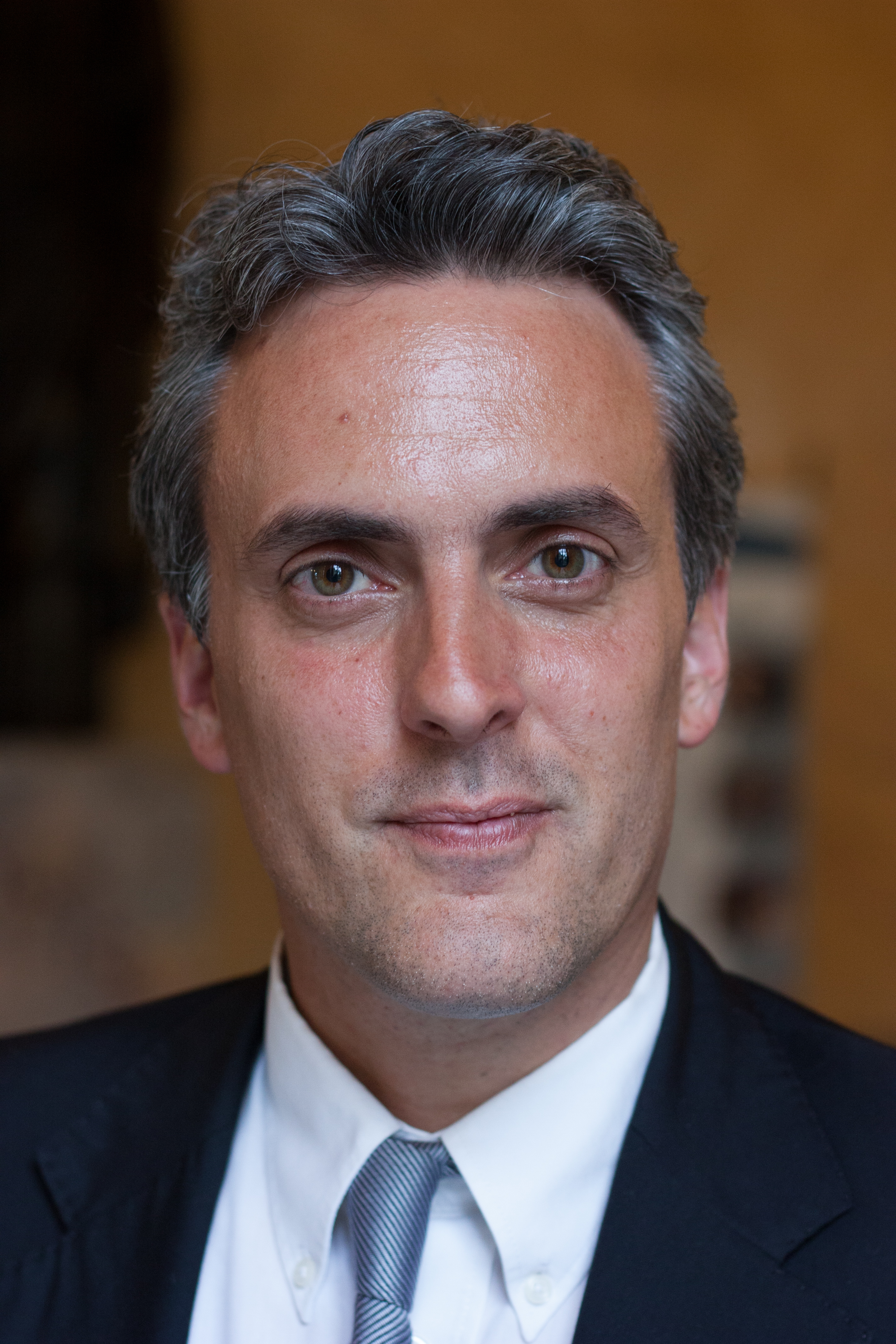
- Denaja in 2012

Member of the French National Assembly for Hérault's 7th constituency
- In office 20 June 2012 – 20 June 2017
- Preceded by: Gilles d'Ettore
- Succeeded by: Christophe Euzet

Personal details
- Born: 14 January 1979 (age 47)
- Party: Socialist Party

Sébastien Denaja (born 14 January 1979) is a French politician serving as a member of the Regional Council of Occitania since 2021. From 2012 to 2017, he was a member of the National Assembly.
