= Pyrénées-Orientales's 2nd constituency =

Constituency of the National Assembly of France

2nd constituency of the Pyrénées-Orientales
- inline Constituency of the National Assembly of France

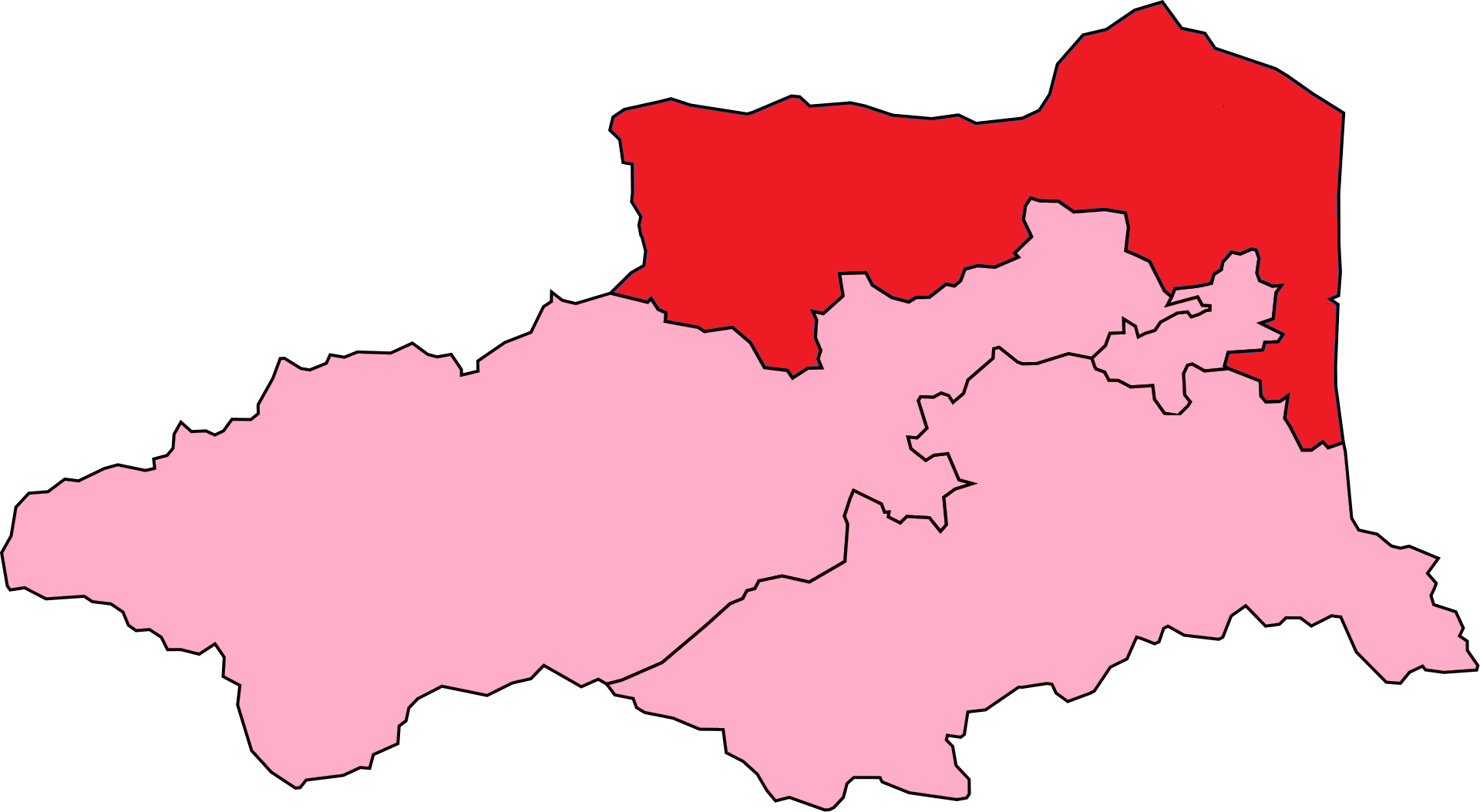
- Pyrénées-Orientales's 2nd Constituency shown within the Pyrénées-Orientales
- Deputy: Anaïs Sabatini; RN
- Department: Pyrénées-Orientales
- Cantons: Canet-en-Roussillon, La Côte-Radieuse, Latour-de-France, Perpignan I, Rivesaltes, Saint-Laurent-de-la-Salanque, Saint-Paul-de-Fenouillet, Sournia
- Registered voters: 96636

The 2nd constituency of the Pyrénées-Orientales (French: Deuxième circonscription des Pyrénées-Orientales) is a French legislative constituency in the Pyrénées-Orientales département. Like the other 576 French constituencies, it elects one MP using the two-round system, with a run-off if no candidate receives over 50% of the vote in the first round.

== Description ==
The 2nd constituency of Pyrénées-Orientales covers the northern portion of the department along with a coastal strip along the Mediterranean Sea. The constituency also includes a small part of Perpignan.

In the 80s and 90s the seat swung broadly inline with the national trend, however since 2002 it has returned conservative deputies. In 2017 the constituency joined seven others in electing a National Front deputy.

== Assembly Members ==
Election	Member	Party
1988	Pierre Estève	PS
1993	André Bascou	RPR
1997	Jean Codognès	PS
2002	Arlette Franco	UMP
2012	Fernand Siré	UMP
2017	Louis Aliot	RN
2020	Catherine Pujol	RN
2022	Anaïs Sabatini	RN

== Election results ==
=== 2024 ===
Candidate	Party	Alliance	First round	
Candidate	Party	Alliance	Votes	%
Anaïs Sabatini	RN		38,323	54.98
Marc Medina	Ind	DVC	14,257	20.45
David Berrué	LE-EELV	NPF	13,910	19.96
Mercedes Garcia	Ind	Regionalists	1,337	1.92
Brigitte Laurens	R!		1,258	1.80
Philippe Goiset	LO		618	0.89
Valid votes			69,703	97.02
Blank votes			1,393	1.94
Null votes			751	1.05
Turnout			71,847	67.68
Abstentions			34,310	32.32
Registered voters			106,157	
Result			RN HOLD	

=== 2022 ===
Legislative Election 2022: Pyrénées-Orientales's 2nd constituency
Party	Candidate	Votes	%	±%
RN	Anaïs Sabatini	17,811	37.62	+6.82
LREM (Ensemble)	Frédérique Lis	9,699	20.49	-8.62
EELV (NUPÉS)	David Berrué	9,601	20.28	+2.44
LR (UDC)	David Bret	4,182	8.83	−4.47
REC	Alexandra Raspaud	2,717	5.74	N/A
DIV	Joël Diago	1,322	2.79	N/A
Others	N/A	2,012	4.25	
Turnout		47,344	46.76	−2.41
2nd round result
RN	Anaïs Sabatini	26,682	61.23	+10.67
LREM (Ensemble)	Frédérique Lis	16,897	38.77	−10.67
Turnout		43,579	45.95	+0.30
RN hold				

=== 2017 ===
Results of the 11 June and 18 June 2017 French National Assembly election in Pyrénées-Orientale’s 2nd Constituency
Candidate	Party		1st round		2nd round	
Candidate	Party		Votes	%	Votes	%
Louis Aliot	National Front	FN	14,237	30.80	20,477	50.56
Christine Espert	Democratic Movement	MoDem	13,456	29.11	20,025	49.44
Fernand Siré	The Republicans	LR	6,145	13.30		
Catherine David	La France Insoumise	FI	4,563	9.87		
Marie-Pierre Sadourny	Socialist Party	PS	2,168	4.69		
Pascal Egido	Communist Party	PCF	1,514	3.28		
Alexis Abat	Regionalist	REG	1,147	2.48		
Dominique Labis	Ecologist	ECO	497	1.08		
Solange Rodier	Debout la France	DLF	493	1.07		
Bérengère Batailler	Ecologist	ECO	461	1.00		
Michel Roig	Independent	DIV	449	0.97		
Laurent Perrie	Regionalist	REG	425	0.92		
Liberto Plana	Far Left	EXG	363	0.79		
Patrick Ramirez	Independent	DIV	301	0.65		
Total			46,219	100%	40,502	100%
Registered voters			96,638		96,636	
Blank/Void ballots			1,301	2.74%	3,608	8.18%
Turnout			47,520	49.17%	44,110	45.65%
Abstentions			49,118	50.83%	52,526	54.35%
Result					FN GAIN FROM UMP	

=== 2012 ===
Results of the 10 June and 17 June 2012 French National Assembly election in Pyrénées-Orientale’s 2nd Constituency
Candidate	Party		1st round		2nd round	
Candidate	Party		Votes	%	Votes	%
Toussainte Calabrese	Socialist Party	PS	17,060	32.14	25,194	49.51
Fernand Sire	Union for a Popular Movement	UMP	14,706	27.70	25,689	50.49
Irina Kortanek	National Front	FN	12,525	23.59		
Françoise Fiter	Left Front	FG	3,493	6.58		
Joseph Puig	The Centre for France	CEN	2,831	5.33		
Marie-Paule Ricard	Europe Ecology – The Greens	EELV	942	1.77		
Audrey Castanet	Ecologist	ECO	488	0.92		
Liberto Plana	Far Left	EXG	305	0.57		
Cécile Sorbier	Ecologist	ECO	285	0.54		
Pascale Clavel	Other	AUT	226	0.43		
Annie Rideau	Far Left	EXG	221	0.42		
Gérald Brachet	Other	AUT	3	0.01		
Total			53,085	100%	50,883	100%
Registered voters			89,077		89,077	
Blank/Void ballots			997	1.84%	2,665	4.98%
Turnout			54,082	60.71%	53,548	60.11%
Abstentions			34,995	39.29%	35,529	39.89%
Result					UMP HOLD	

=== 2007 ===
Results of the 10 June and 17 June 2007 French National Assembly election in Pyrénées-Orientale’s 2nd Constituency
Candidate	Party		1st round		2nd round	
Candidate	Party		Votes	%	Votes	%
Arlette Franco	Union for a Popular Movement	UMP	28,040	48.31	33,630	59.78
Renee Soum	Socialist Party	PS	12,655	21.80	22,622	40.22
Pierre Aloy	National Front	FN	3,918	6.75		
Maryse Lapergue	UDF-Democratic Movement	UDF-MoDem	3,472	5.98		
Nadine Pons	Communist Party	PCF	2,776	4.78		
Ghislaine Zaparty	Far Left	EXG	1,345	2.32		
Katia Mingo	The Greens	LV	1,104	1.90		
Jocelyne Roge-Balaguer	Hunting, Fishing, Nature and Traditions	CPNT	1,081	1.86		
Audrey Castanet	Ecologist	ECO	827	1.42		
Roger Foinels	Movement for France	MPF	818	1.41		
Daniel Canellas	Regionalist	REG	572	0.99		
Liberto Plana	Far Left	EXG	486	0.84		
Simone Thomas	Far Right	EXD	409	0.70		
Daniel Drouillard	Far Left	EXG	275	0.47		
Pascal Le Jolly	Independent	DIV	263	0.45		
Gabriela Koval	Independent	DIV	0	0.00		
Total			58,041	100%	56,252	100%
Registered voters			96,750		96,745	
Blank/Void ballots			1,468	2.47%	2,742	4.65%
Turnout			59,509	61.51%	58,994	60.98%
Abstentions			37,241	38.49%	37,751	39.02%
Result					UMP HOLD	

=== 2002 ===
Results of the 9 June and 16 June 2002 French National Assembly election in Pyrénées-Orientale’s 2nd Constituency
Candidate	Party		1st round		2nd round	
Candidate	Party		Votes	%	Votes	%
Jean Codognes	Socialist Party	PS	18,533	33.92	26,066	49.14
Arlette Franco	Union for a Presidential Majority	UMP	18,435	33.74	26,976	50.86
Maryse Besse	National Front	FN	9,871	18.07		
Alain Esclope	Hunting, Fishing, Nature and Traditions	CPNT	2,398	4.39		
Audrey Schall	Independent	DIV	963	1.76		
Ghislaine Zaparty	Revolutionary Communist League	LCR	821	1.50		
Roger Chenaye	National Republican Movement	MNR	628	1.15		
M. Françoise Bile Centene	Republican Pole	PR	607	1.11		
Jaume Roure	Regionalist	REG	574	1.05		
Liberto Plana	Workers' Struggle	LO	566	1.04		
Roger Foinels	Movement for France	MPF	507	0.93		
Laetitia Sanchez	Independent	DIV	398	0.73		
Anne Legrout	Ecologist	ECO	178	0.33		
Daniel Drouillard	Far Left	EXG	152	0.28		
Total			54,631	100%	53,042	100%
Registered voters			85,493		85,481	
Blank/Void ballots			1,344	2.40%	2,970	5.30%
Turnout			55,975	65.47%	56,012	65.53%
Abstentions			29,518	34.53%	29,469	34.47%
Result					UMP GAIN FROM PS	
