= Sophie Blanc =

French politician (born 1968)

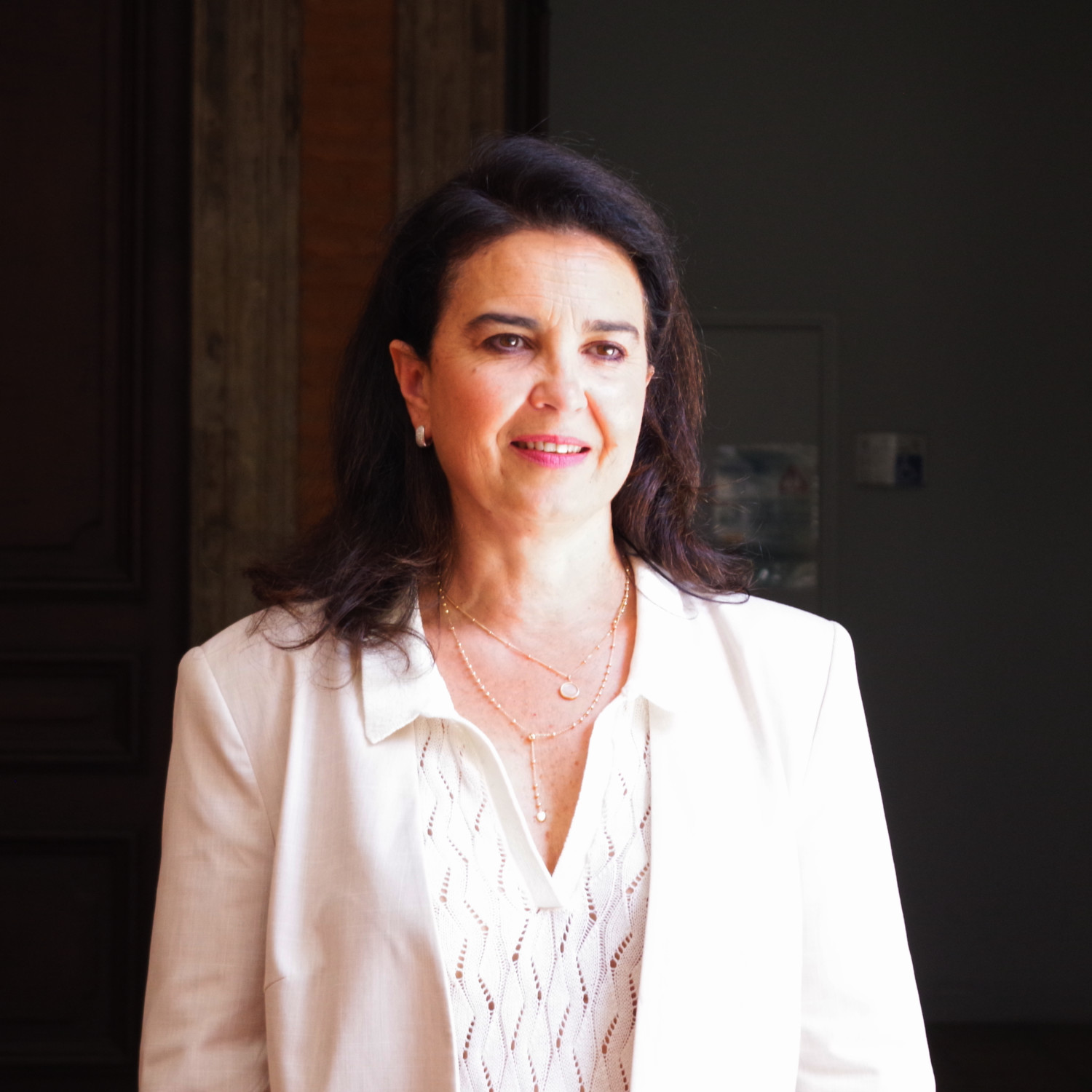
- Sophie Blanc in 2022

Member of the National Assembly for Pyrénées-Orientales's 1st constituency
- Incumbent
- Assumed office 22 June 2022
- Preceded by: Romain Grau

Member of the Municipal council of Perpignan
- Incumbent
- Assumed office 28 June 2020
- Mayor: Louis Aliot

Personal details
- Born: 20 February 1968 (age 58) Toulouse, France
- Party: National Rally
- Profession: Lawyer

Sophie Blanc (born 20 February 1968) is a French lawyer and politician from National Rally (RN) who has represented the 1st constituency of Pyrénées-Orientales in the National Assembly since 2022.

Blanc holds a PhD in law and was a lawyer at the bar of Perpignan for over twenty years. She was elected as a regional councilor in 2015 and was a community advisor to the mayor's office in Perpignan.

== Biography ==
Sophie Blanc was born on 20 February 1968.

She is a lawyer by profession. Elected to the Perpignan municipal council alongside Louis Aliot, she took on the role of deputy in charge of education and school catering.

She is a candidate for the 2021 regional elections on Jean-Paul Garraud's RN list in Pyrénées-Orientales, and is elected regional councillor for Occitanie. She is a member of the "Education, Guidance and Youth" and "Higher Education and Research" commissions.

In the 2022 legislative elections, she ran for the Rassemblement National and was elected deputy for the first constituency of Pyrénées-Orientales on 19 June 2022 with 53.87% of the vote against her rival Romain Grau (outgoing deputy), a candidate for La République en marche.

Bound by the legal provisions on holding multiple offices, she chose to remain a regional councillor and resigned her municipal and community councillor mandates in September 2022.

At the French National Assembly, she is a member of the Rassemblement National group. She is a member of the Cultural and Education Affairs Committee.

== See also ==
- List of deputies of the 16th National Assembly of France
