= Romain Grau =

French politician

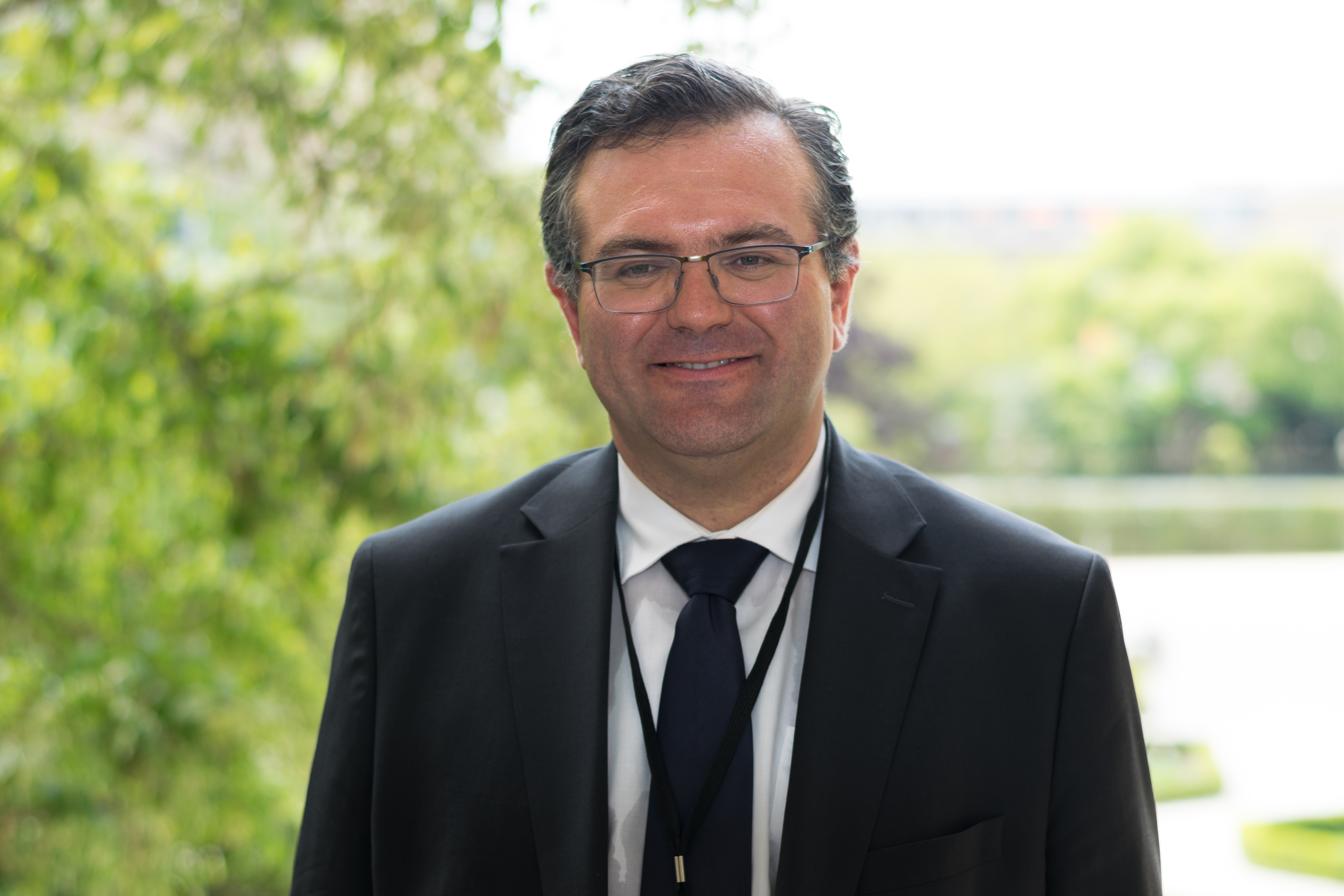

Member of the National Assembly for Pyrénées-Orientales's 1st constituency
- In office 21 June 2017 – 21 June 2022
- Preceded by: Jacques Cresta
- Succeeded by: Sophie Blanc

Personal details
- Born: 21 June 1974 (age 52) Perpignan
- Party: La République En Marche!
- Education: École nationale d'administration (ENA)

Romain Grau (born 21 June 1974) is a French politician of La République En Marche! (LREM) who served as member of the French National Assembly from 2017 to 2022, representing Pyrénées-Orientales's 1st constituency.

== Early life and education ==
Born into a family of winemakers from Villemolaque, Grau is a graduate of Sciences Po and École nationale d'administration (ENA).

== Political career ==
In parliament, Grau served as member of the Finance Committee.

In July 2019, Grau voted in favor of the French ratification of the European Union’s Comprehensive Economic and Trade Agreement (CETA) with Canada. Shortly after, his office in Perpignan was set on fire while he was inside during anti-government protests of the Yellow vests movement. In 2022, he received a punch in the chin at a protest against the vaccine passport during the COVID-19 pandemic.

Grau lost his seat in the second round of the 2022 French legislative election to Sophie Blanc from the National Rally.

== See also ==
- 2017 French legislative election
