= Hérault's 7th constituency =

Constituency of the National Assembly of France

7th constituency of Hérault
- inline Constituency of the National Assembly of France

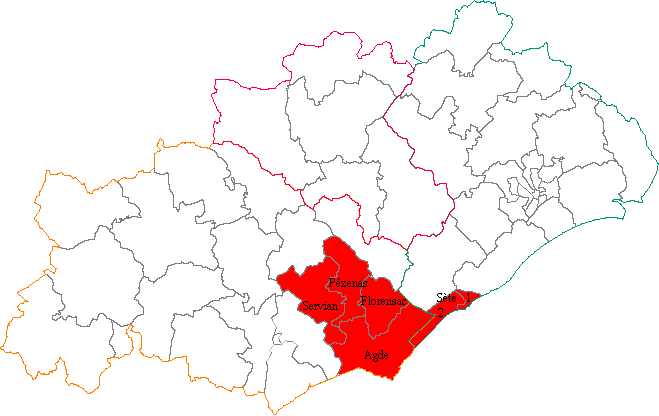
- Constituency in department

- Location of Hérault in France
- Deputy: Aurélien Lopez-Liguori; RN
- Department: Hérault
- Cantons: (pre-2015) Agde, Florensac, Pézenas, Servian, Sète-1, Sète-2
- Registered voters: 108,908

The 7th constituency of Hérault is a French legislative constituency in the Hérault département.

== Description ==
In 2013, the population of this electoral district was 135,992. In the 2017 Legislative elections, the number of voters was 102,087.

== Deputies ==
Election	Member	Party
1988	Jean Lacombe	PS
1993	Yves Marchand	UDF
1997	François Liberti	PCF
2002	François Liberti	PCF
2007	Gilles d'Ettore	UMP
2012	Sébastien Denaja	PS
2017	Christophe Euzet	REM
2022	Aurélien Lopez-Liguori	RN

== Election results ==
=== 2024 ===
Candidate	Party	Alliance	First round			Second round		
Candidate	Party	Alliance	Votes	%	+/–	Votes	%	+/–
Aurélien Lopez-Liguori	RN		37,495	51.66	+20.65			
Gabriel Blasco	PCF	NFP	18,415	25.37	+3.62			
Jocelyne Gizardin	HOR	Ensemble	15,618	21.52	-2.17			
Daniel Pilaudeau	LO		1,047	1.44	+0.73			
Votes			72,575	100.00				
Valid votes			72,575	96.85	-1.22			
Blank votes			1,485	1.98	+0.69			
Null votes			873	1.17	+0.53			
Turnout			74,933	67.84	+19.29			
Abstentions			35,529	32.16	-19.29			
Registered voters			110,462					
Result			RN HOLD					

=== 2022 ===
Legislative Election 2022: Hérault's 7th constituency
Party	Candidate	Votes	%	±%
RN	Aurélien Lopez-Liguori	16,079	31.01	+7.34
PCF (NUPÉS)	Gabriel Blasco	11,278	21.75	-6.31
Agir (Ensemble)	Christophe Euzet	10,031	19.35	−5.64
LR	Yves Michel	5,328	10.28	−4.40
PS	Julie Garcin-Saudo*	3,404	6.57	N/A
REC	Audrey Cavaillé	2,982	5.75	N/A
AEI	Guillaume Sultani	850	1.64	+0.77
Others	N/A	1,898	3.66	N/A
Turnout		52,871	48.55	−0.13
2nd round result
RN	Aurélien Lopez-Liguori	27,378	59.19	+12.02
PCF (NUPÉS)	Gabriel Blasco	18,873	40.81	N/A
Turnout		46,251	47.63	+4.88
RN gain from LREM				

* PS dissident

=== 2017 ===
Candidate	Label	First round		Second round	
Candidate	Label	Votes	%	Votes	%
Christophe Euzet	REM	12,120	24.99	20,623	52.83
Myriam Roques	FN	11,483	23.67	18,414	47.17
Laurence Magne	LR	7,123	14.68		
Sébastien Denaja	PS	6,029	12.43		
Marie-Hélène Leclercq	FI	5,195	10.71		
Jean-Luc Bou	PCF	2,388	4.92		
Agnès Gizard-Carlin	DVG	702	1.45		
Christophe Panis	EXD	666	1.37		
Virginie Angevin	DLF	599	1.23		
Magali Richaud	DIV	592	1.22		
Igor Kurek	DVD	492	1.01		
Jean-Claude Martinez	EXD	417	0.86		
Daniel Pilaudeau	EXG	283	0.58		
Bruno Luigi	DIV	264	0.54		
Guy Pagès	EXG	153	0.32		
Votes		48,506	100.00	39,037	100.00
Valid votes		48,506	97.60	39,037	89.45
Blank votes		857	1.72	3,158	7.24
Null votes		334	0.67	1,446	3.31
Turnout		49,697	48.68	43,641	42.75
Abstentions		52,390	51.32	58,446	57.25
Registered voters		102,087		102,087	
Source: Ministry of the Interior

=== 2012 ===
2012 legislative election in Herault's 7th constituency
Candidate	Party	First round		Second round	
Candidate	Party	Votes	%	Votes	%
Gilles D'Ettore	UMP	19,100	32.50%	22,826	37.32%
Sébastien Denaja	PS	18,422	31.35%	26,247	42.92%
France Jamet	FN	12,959	22.05%	12,085	19.76%
Sébastien Andral	FG	5,516	9.39%		
Adeline Berard	AEI	688	1.17%		
Michel Colas	DLR	436	0.74%		
Marie Pince	POC	435	0.74%		
Serge Jene	AC	411	0.70%		
Olivier Goudou	Cap 21	284	0.48%		
Brigitte Moulin	LO	270	0.46%		
Carmelo Martelli	SP	142	0.24%		
Valérie Paringaux		107	0.18%		
Valid votes		58,770	98.53%	61,158	98.27%
Spoilt and null votes		878	1.47%	1,074	1.73%
Votes cast / turnout		59,648	62.14%	62,232	64.84%
Abstentions		36,335	37.86%	33,742	35.16%
Registered voters		95,983	100.00%	95,974	100.00%

=== 2007 ===
Legislative Election 2007: Hérault's 7th constituency
Party	Candidate	Votes	%	±%
UMP	Gilles d'Ettore	29,839	41.20	
PCF	François Liberti	17,659	24.38	
PS	Geneviève Tapie	8,082	11.16	
FN	Jean-Claude Martinez	5,363	7.41	
MoDem	Marie-Claude Domingot	3,503	4.84	
DVD	Bruno Escaffre	2,122	2.93	
Others	N/A	5,851		
Turnout		73,707	61.52	
2nd round result
UMP	Gilles d'Ettore	38,913	52.69	
PCF	François Liberti	34,933	47.31	
Turnout		76,311	63.69	
UMP gain from PCF				

=== 2002 ===
Legislative Election 2002: Hérault's 7th constituency
Party	Candidate	Votes	%	±%
UMP	François Commeinhes	19,427	28.16	
PCF	François Liberti	14,007	20.30	
FN	Jean-Claude Martinez	13,890	20.13	
PS	Regis Passerieux	11,376	16.49	
CPNT	Christophe Morgo	3,068	4.45	
LV	Jean-Baptiste Giordano	1,411	2.05	
Others	N/A	4,547		
Turnout		70,494	65.61	
2nd round result
PCF	François Liberti	28,732	42.03	
UMP	François Commeinhes	27,904	40.82	
FN	Jean-Claude Martinez	11,725	17.15	
Turnout		70,296	65.43	
PCF hold				

=== 1997 ===
Legislative Election 1997: Hérault's 7th constituency
Party	Candidate	Votes	%	±%
PCF	François Liberti	15,718	24.70	
UDF	Yves Marchand*	14,424	22.67	
FN	Lucien Brouillet	12,905	20.28	
PS	Régis Passerieux	11,672	18.34	
DVE	Yves Pietrasanta	4,003	6.29	
LV	Roselyne Balher	1,561	2.45	
Others	N/A	3,355		
Turnout		66,175	70.18	
2nd round result
PCF	François Liberti	35,684	60.49	
FN	Lucien Brouillet	23,306	39.51	
Turnout		66,596	70.64	
PCF gain from UDF				

* Withdrew before the 2nd round

== Sources ==
- Official results of French elections: "Résultats électoraux officiels en France" (in French).
