= Anaïs Sabatini =

French politician

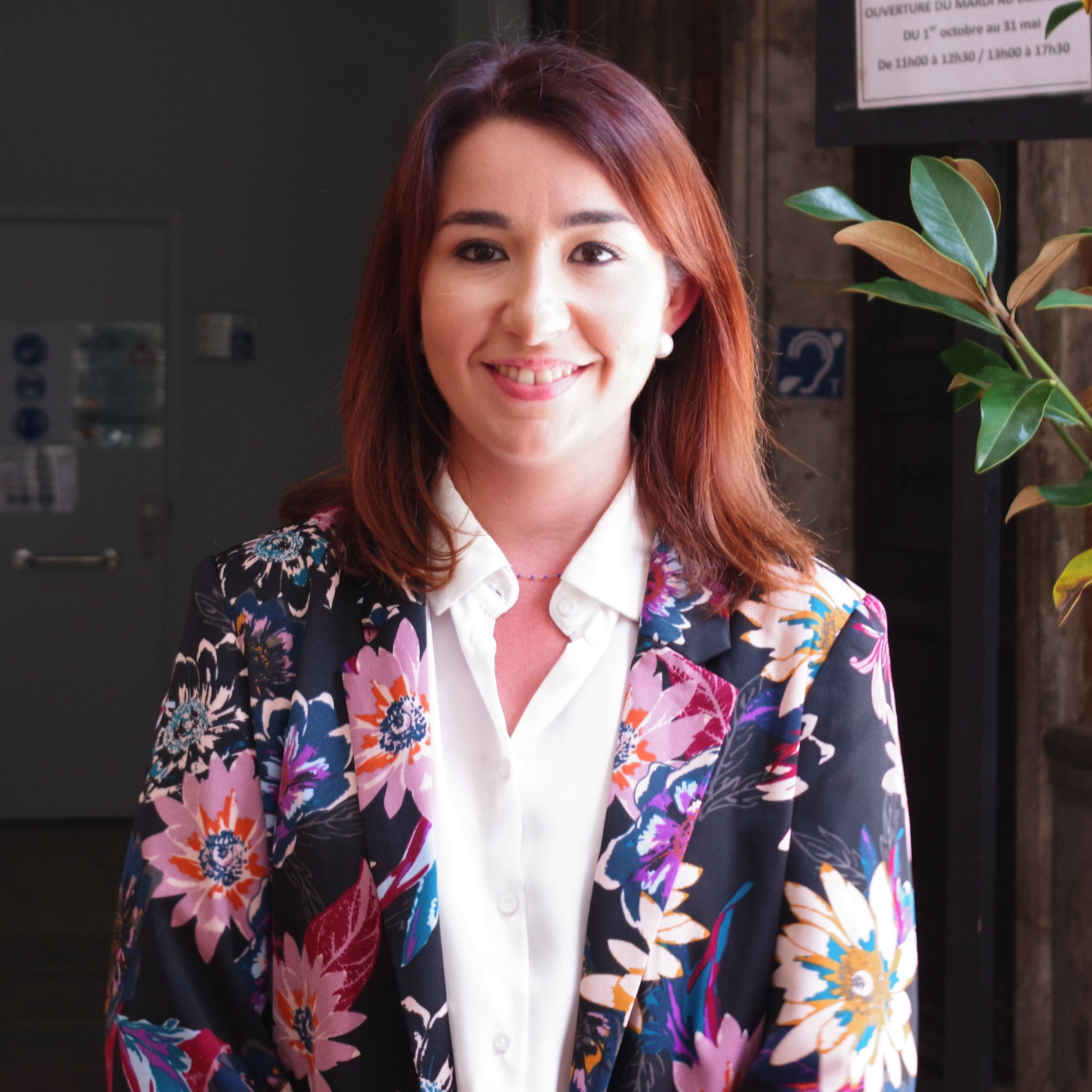
- Anaïs Sabatini in 2022

Member of the National Assembly for Pyrénées-Orientales's 2nd constituency
- Incumbent
- Assumed office 22 June 2022
- Preceded by: Catherine Pujol

Member of the Municipal council of Perpignan
- Incumbent
- Assumed office 28 June 2020
- Mayor: Louis Aliot

Personal details
- Born: 10 March 1990 (age 36) Perpignan, France
- Party: National Rally
- Profession: Lawyer

Anaïs Sabatini (born 1990) is a French lawyer and politician from National Rally (RN) who has represented the 2nd constituency of Pyrénées-Orientales in the National Assembly since 2022.

Sabatini was born in Perpignan in 1990. She studied for a law degree and practices as a lawyer in family law and children's rights. She was previously a member of the youth wing for the Union for a Popular Movement and then The Republicans Les Jeunes Républicains but left the party in 2019. Later that year she was elected as a municipal councilor for the National Rally in Perpignan.

== See also ==
- List of deputies of the 16th National Assembly of France
