= Aurélien Lopez-Liguori =

French politician

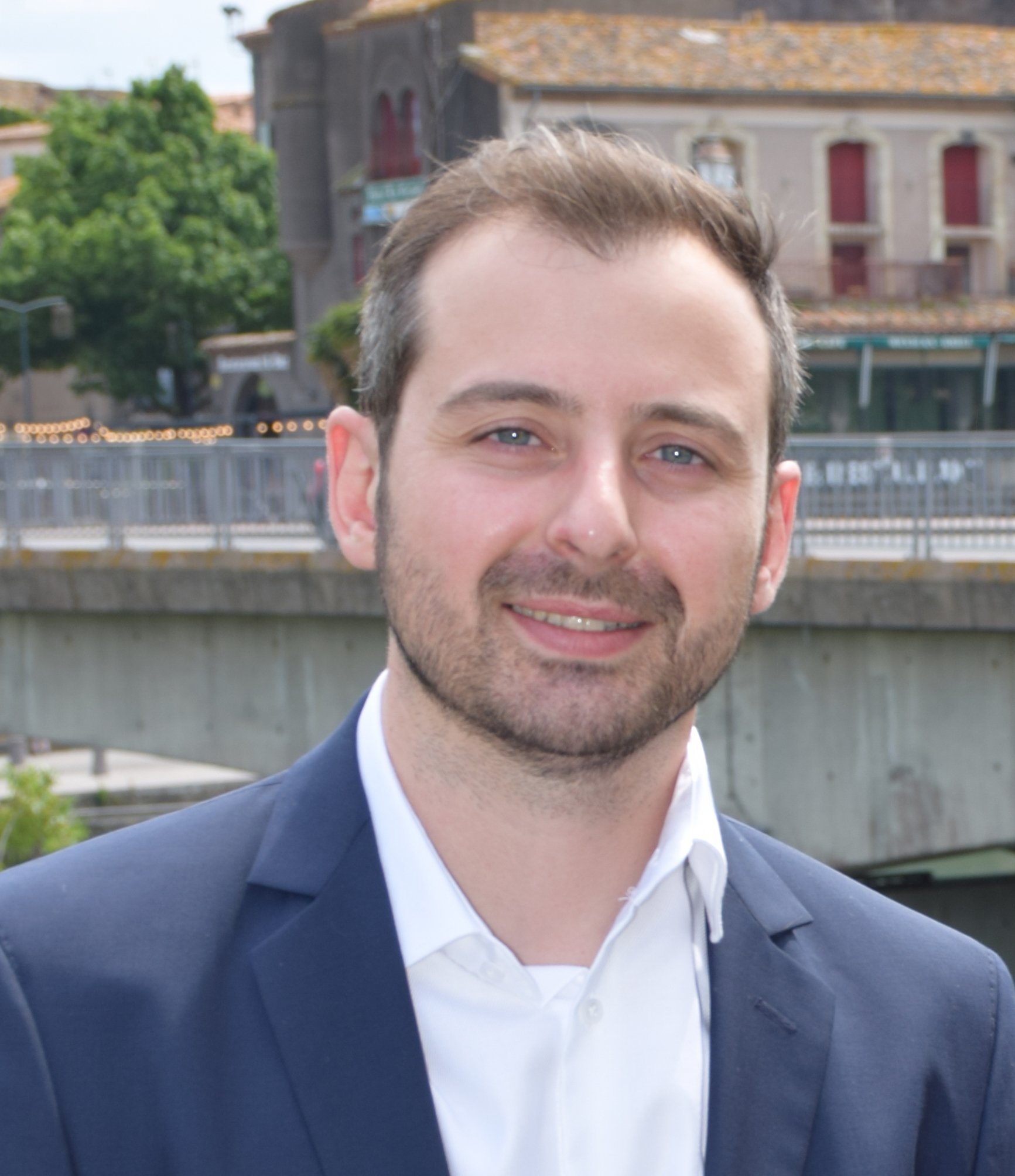

Member of the National Assembly for Hérault's 7th constituency
- Incumbent
- Assumed office 2022
- Preceded by: Christophe Euzet

Personal details
- Born: 17 May 1993 (age 32) Aix-en-Provence, France
- Party: National Rally

Aurélien Lopez-Liguori (born 17 May 1993) is a French politician for the National Rally (RN). He was elected as a deputy in the National Assembly for Hérault's 7th constituency in 2022.

== Biography ==
Lopez-Liguori was born and raised in Aix-en-Provence. His parents are both pieds-noirs who were born in French Algeria of Spanish and Italian origin. He was a semi-professional rugby player until suffering an injury in 2012.

He has claimed he was interested in politics at school but stated the Charlie Hebdo shooting influenced his decision to become politically active. He campaigned for Nicolas Dupont-Aignan during the 2017 French presidential election before joining the National Rally in 2019. He was employed as a researcher on European international affairs in the European Parliament and worked as an assistant to National Rally MEP Jean-Lin Lacapelle. He was elected as a municipal councilor of Sète in 2020 for the FN. He contested the seat of Hérault's 7th constituency during the 2022 French legislative election. During the election, incumbent deputy Christophe Euzet failed to make the second round leaving Lopez-Liguori and French Communist Party candidate (running affiliated to NUPES) Garbiel Blasco. During the second round he defeated Blasco and was elected to represent the constituency.

He was re-elected in the first round of the 2024 legislative elections with 51.66% of the vote. He sits with the RN group and is a member of the National Assembly's Law Commission. He defends the concept of digital sovereignty.
