= Lauriane Josende =

French politician (born 1977)

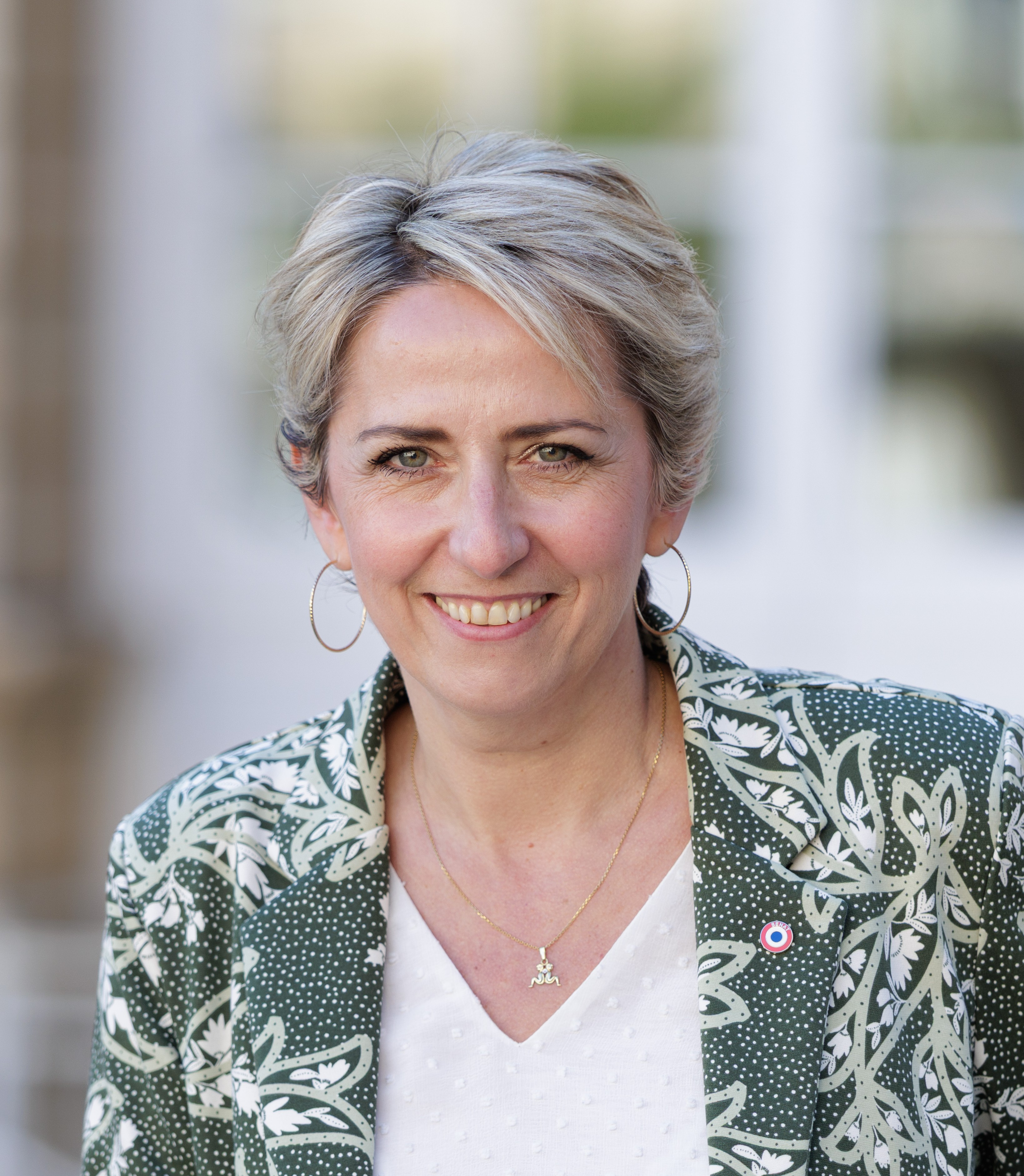

Member of the Senate
- Incumbent
- Assumed office 2 October 2023
- Constituency: Pyrénées-Orientales

Personal details
- Born: 13 June 1977 (age 49)
- Party: The Republicans

Lauriane Josende (born 13 June 1977) is a French politician serving as a member of the Senate since 2023. She has served as departmental secretary of The Republicans in Pyrénées-Orientales since 2025, having previously served from 2018 to 2019.

== Biography ==
After earning a master’s degree in public law from the University of Perpignan Via Domitia in 1999, Lauriane Josende continued her studies in Toulouse, where she earned a DEA in fundamental public law in 2000. In 2005, at the University of Toulouse 1, she defended a doctoral dissertation in public law titled “Freedom of Expression and Democracy: Reflections on a Paradox,” under the supervision of Henry Roussillon. This dissertation was published in 2010 by Bruylant.

She is the daughter of Hélène Josende, who served as mayor of Angoustrine-Villeneuve-des-Escaldes from 1995 to 2020 and as a departmental councilor for the Pyrénées-Orientales from 2015 to 2021, alongside Jean Castex.
