= Pyrénées-Orientales's 3rd constituency =

Constituency of the National Assembly of France

3rd constituency of the Pyrénées-Orientales
- inline Constituency of the National Assembly of France

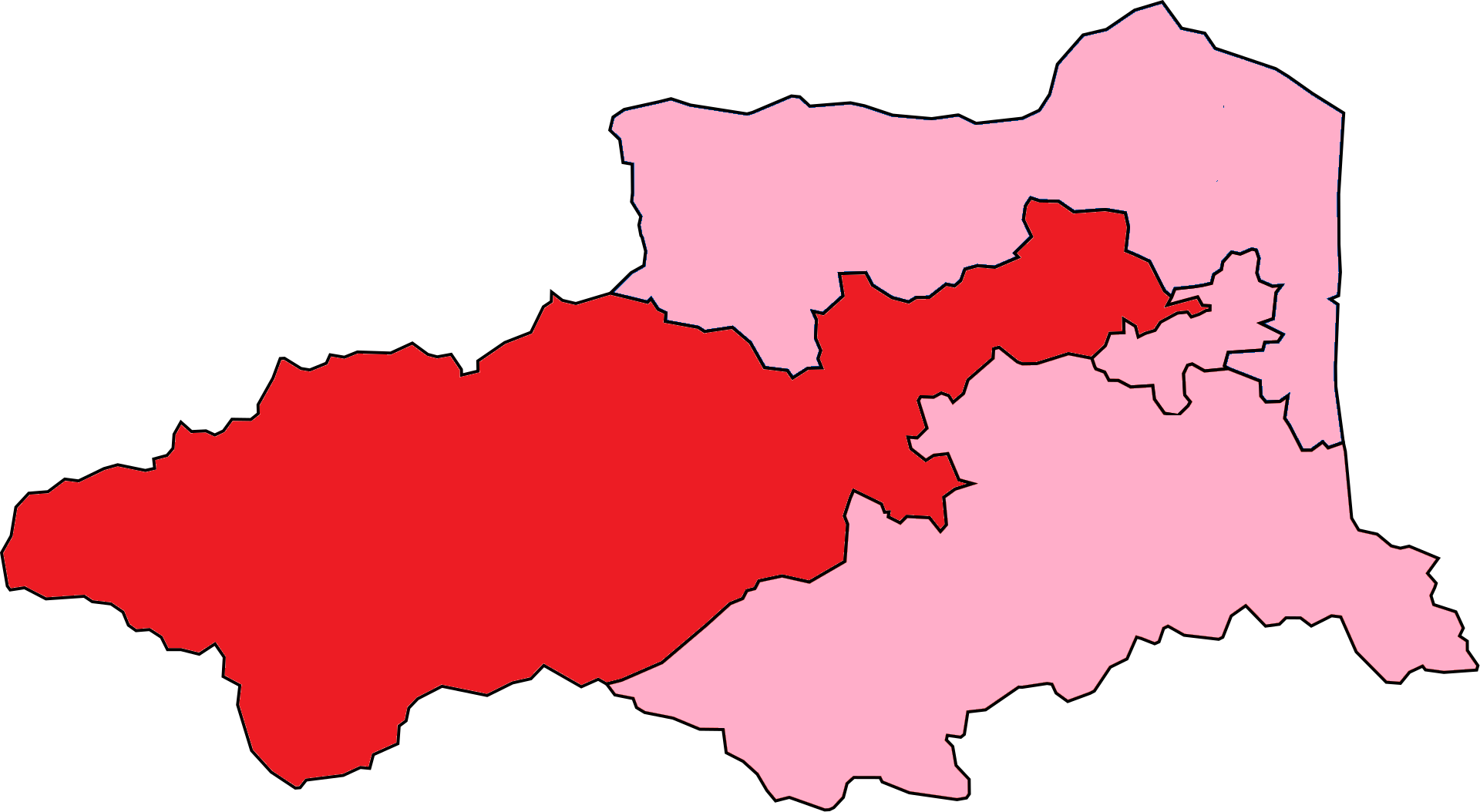
- Pyrénées-Orientales's 3rd Constituency shown within the Pyrénées-Orientales
- Deputy: Sandrine Dogor-Such; RN
- Department: Pyrénées-Orientales
- Cantons: Millas, Mont-Louis, Olette, Perpignan II, Perpignan VI, Perpignan VIII, Prades, Saillagouse, Saint-Estève, Vinça
- Registered voters: 83040

The 3rd constituency of the Pyrénées-Orientales (French: Troisième circonscription des Pyrénées-Orientales) is a French legislative constituency in the Pyrénées-Orientales département. Like the other 576 French constituencies, it elects one MP using the two-round system, with a run-off if no candidate receives over 50% of the vote in the first round.

== Description ==
The 3rd constituency of Pyrénées-Orientales stretches from Perpignan to the south western edge of the department.

The seat has broadly followed the national voting trends including the 2017 election when the voters elected the En Marche! candidate, however there was also a strong performance by the National Front who came second.

== Assembly Members ==
Election	Member	Party
1993	François Calvet	RPR
1997	Christian Bourquin	PS
2002	François Calvet	UMP
2007	François Calvet	UMP
2012	Ségolène Neuville	PS
2017	Laurence Gayte	LREM
2022	Sandrine Dogor-Such	RN

== Election results ==
=== 2024 ===
Candidate	Party	Alliance	First round		Second round	
Candidate	Party	Alliance	Votes	%	Votes	%
Sandrine Dogor-Such	RN		25,363	45.57	29,118	56.28
Nathalie Cullen	LFI	NPF	15,603	28.03	22,623	43.72
Laurence Gayte	REN	Ensemble	11,367	20.42		
Lucila Gray	Ind	REG	1,780	3.20		
Alexandre Michaut	R!		935	1.68		
Anna-Maria Urroz	LO		612	1.10		
Valid votes			55,660	96.31	51,741	90.06
Blank votes			1,417	2.45	4,099	7.13
Null votes			717	1.24	1,611	2.80
Turnout			57,794	67.48	57,451	67.08
Abstentions			27,856	32.52	28,204	32.93
Registered voters			85,650		85,655	
Result			RN HOLD			

=== 2022 ===
Legislative Election 2022: Pyrénées-Orientales's 3rd constituency
Party	Candidate	Votes	%	±%
RN	Sandrine Dogor-Such	11,247	27.67	+8.39
LFI (NUPÉS)	Nathalie Cullell	11,091	27.29	-5.75
LREM (Ensemble)	Pierre Bataille	9,902	24.36	+1.66
LR (UDC)	Laurence Martin	2,359	5.80	−7.37
REC	Charles Mandar	1,963	4.83	N/A
R!	Henri Guitart	1,527	3.76	N/A
DIV	Morgane Le Floch	1,044	2.57	N/A
Others	N/A	1,510	3.72	
Turnout		40,643	49.24	−0.05
2nd round result
RN	Sandrine Dogor-Such	19,299	54.11	+13.42
LFI (NUPÉS)	Nathalie Cullell	16,368	45.89	N/A
Turnout		35,667	48.33	+4.83
RN gain from LREM				

=== 2017 ===
Results of the 11 June and 18 June 2017 French National Assembly election in Pyrénées-Orientale’s 3rd Constituency
Candidate	Party		1st round		2nd round	
Candidate	Party		Votes	%	Votes	%
Laurence Gayte	La République En Marche!	LREM	9,029	22.70	18,501	59.31
Sandrine Dogor	National Front	FN	7,669	19.28	12,693	40.69
Ségolène Neuville	Socialist Party	PS	6,238	15.68		
Philippe Assens	La France Insoumise	FI	5,784	14.54		
Danièle Pagès	The Republicans	LR	5,238	13.17		
Mireille Bossy	Independent	DIV	1,765	4.44		
Catherine Barrère	Regionalist	REG	1,504	3.78		
Léa Tyteca	Communist Party	PCF	1,123	2.82		
Roland Scaramozzino	Ecologist	ECO	470	1.18		
Patricia Roget	Debout la France	DLF	413	1.04		
Anna-Maria Urroz	Far Left	EXG	280	0.70		
Blandine Urbanski	Independent	DIV	267	0.67		
Total			39,780	100%	31,194	100%
Registered voters			83,053		83,040	
Blank/Void ballots			1,153	2.82%	4,927	13.64%
Turnout			40,933	49.29%	36,121	43.50%
Abstentions			42,120	50.71%	46,919	56.50%
Result					REM GAIN FROM PS	

=== 2012 ===
Results of the 10 June and 17 June 2012 French National Assembly election in Pyrénées-Orientale’s 3rd Constituency
Candidate	Party		1st round		2nd round	
Candidate	Party		Votes	%	Votes	%
Ségolène Neuville	Socialist Party	PS	18,190	37.65	25,458	53.03
Jean Castex	Union for a Popular Movement	UMP	14,743	30.52	22,550	46.97
Bruno Lemaire	National Front	FN	9,022	18.67		
Daniel Borreill	Left Front	FG	3,491	7.23		
Jean-Marc Panis	Europe Ecology – The Greens	EELV	1,372	2.84		
Claude Sala	Ecologist	ECO	415	0.86		
Daniel Fabresse	Far Left	EXG	325	0.67		
Ahmed Sobban	Miscellaneous Left	DVG	244	0.51		
Christian Desrousseaux	Ecologist	ECO	243	0.50		
Anna-Maria Urpoz	Far Left	EXG	185	0.38		
Jean-Marie Rul	Other	AUT	81	0.17		
Total			48,311	100%	48,008	100%
Registered voters			80,130		80,123	
Blank/Void ballots			827	1.68%	1,819	3.65%
Turnout			49,138	61.32%	49,827	62.19%
Abstentions			30,992	38.68%	30,296	37.81%
Result					PS GAIN FROM UMP	

=== 2007 ===
Results of the 10 June and 17 June 2007 French National Assembly election in Pyrénées-Orientale’s 3rd Constituency
Candidate	Party		1st round		2nd round	
Candidate	Party		Votes	%	Votes	%
François Calvet	Union for a Popular Movement	UMP	17,268	42.84	20,881	51.94
Christian Bourquin	Socialist Party	PS	12,421	30.82	19,321	48.06
Francoise Fiter	Communist Party	PCF	2,038	5.06		
Dominique Schemla	UDF-Democratic Movement	UDF-MoDem	2,037	5.05		
Francoise Bataillon	National Front	FN	1,644	4.08		
Claude Begue	Far Left	EXG	1,296	3.22		
Claude Sala	Ecologist	ECO	708	1.76		
Jacques Duverger	Hunting, Fishing, Nature and Traditions	CPNT	487	1.21		
Pierre Prat	Independent	DIV	473	1.17		
Christiane Dugelay	Independent	DIV	447	1.11		
Jordi Vera	Regionalist	REG	434	1.08		
Enric Vilanova Cortassa	Regionalist	REG	424	1.05		
Monique Reze	Movement for France	MPF	364	0.90		
Patrice Basso	Far Left	EXG	264	0.65		
Odile Thevenot	Independent	DIV	1	0.00		
Total			40,306	100%	40,202	100%
Registered voters			65,996		65,988	
Blank/Void ballots			883	2.14%	1,951	4.63%
Turnout			41,189	62.41%	42,153	63.88%
Abstentions			24,807	37.59%	23,835	36.12%
Result					UMP HOLD	

=== 2002 ===
Results of the 9 June and 16 June 2002 French National Assembly election in Pyrénées-Orientale’s 3rd Constituency
Candidate	Party		1st round		2nd round	
Candidate	Party		Votes	%	Votes	%
François Calvet	Union for a Presidential Majority	UMP	13,423	33.84	19,772	51.52
Christian Bourquin	Socialist Party	PS	12,335	31.10	18,606	48.48
Annie Tutin	National Front	FN	4,887	12.32		
Françoise Fiter	Communist Party	PCF	2,222	5.60		
Christian Blanc	Miscellaneous Right	DVD	1,618	4.08		
Conception Gallego	Hunting, Fishing, Nature and Traditions	CPNT	851	2.15		
François Ferrand	The Greens	LV	786	1.98		
Bernard Cholet	Revolutionary Communist League	LCR	680	1.71		
Pierre Prat	Independent	DIV	599	1.51		
Jordi Vera	Regionalist	REG	455	1.15		
Irene Nuccio	Independent	DIV	432	1.09		
Simon Sales	Republican Pole	PR	353	0.89		
Christian Pourriere	Independent	DIV	281	0.71		
Esther Silan	Workers' Struggle	LO	269	0.68		
Françoise Marin	National Republican Movement	MNR	236	0.59		
Maryse Lapergue	Ecologist	ECO	136	0.34		
Denis Bellac	Miscellaneous Right	DVD	105	0.26		
Total			39,668	100%	38,378	100%
Registered voters			61,699		61,694	
Blank/Void ballots			933	2.30%	2,052	5.08%
Turnout			40,601	65.80%	40,430	65.53%
Abstentions			21,098	34.20%	21,264	34.47%
Result					UMP GAIN FROM PS	
