= Daniel Mach =

French politician

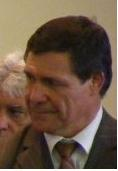
Daniel Mach

Daniel Mach (born December 5, 1955, in Perpignan — Perpinyà) was a member of the National Assembly of France. He represented the Pyrénées-Orientales's 1st constituency from 2002 to 2012 as a member of the Union for a Popular Movement. He is the first politician to have spoken in Catalan in the National Assembly, saying:

'Senyora, els catalans són gent orgullosa, honesta i pacífica. La seva llengua és un dret i saben quins són els seus deures.'
"The catalans are a proud, honest and peaceful people. Their language is a right and they know what their responsibilities are."
