= Laurence Gayte =

French politician

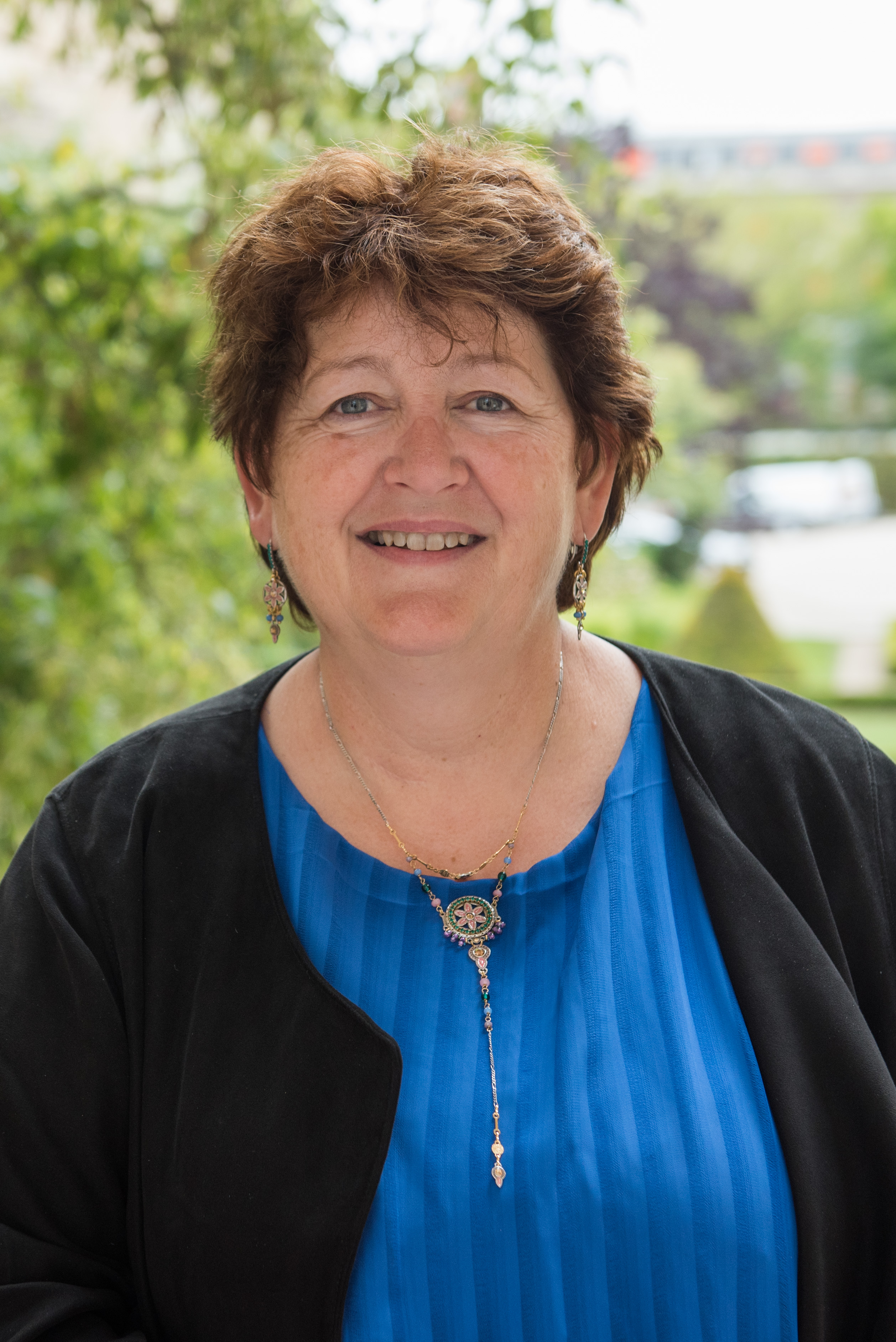

Member of the National Assembly for Pyrénées-Orientales's 3rd constituency
- Incumbent
- Assumed office 21 July 2017
- Preceded by: Ségolène Neuville

Member of the Municipal council of Saint-Estève
- In office 2010–2014

Personal details
- Born: 25 September 1965 (age 60) Paris, France
- Party: LREM

Laurence Gayte (born 25 September 1965) is a French politician of La République En Marche! (LREM) who has been serving as a member of the National Assembly of France since 2017, where she represents the 3rd constituency of the Pyrénées-Orientales.

== Early life and education ==
Gayte is a graduate of the Institute of Political Studies in Rennes and also has a degree in environmental engineering. She manages, with her husband, a computer company based in Saint-Estève.

== Political career ==
=== Member of the Saint-Estève's Municipal council ===
Between 2010 and 2014, Gayte was a member of the Municipal council of Saint-Estève. She focused on urban planning and the environment.

=== Member of the National Assembly ===
In May 2017, Gayte was nominated by La République En Marche! for the legislative election in the 3rd constituency of the Pyrénées-Orientales. The La République En Marche! would have considered not to present a candidate against Ségolène Neuville, the outgoing socialist deputy and former State Secretary for the Disabled and against Social Exclusion.

Gayte was elected in the second round with 59.31% of the votes.

In the National Assembly, Gayte serves on the Committee on Sustainable Development and Spatial Planning. She is also a Vice President of the Female Entrepreneurship's Working Group and Vice President of the Promotion of tourist activities's Working Group.

In October 2018, Gayte urged France to put pressure on Andorra to allow abortion, using the co-prince function held by the President of the French Republic.

In 2018, Prime Minister Édouard Philippe appointed Gayte to conduct the government's information mission on "Level crossing safety". Its government information mission lasts from 14 November 2018 to 19 March 2019. In that role, Gayte met many actors from the railway and road safety sectors, official bodies, experts, accident victims associations and traveled to many departments to analyze the situation. On 21 April 2019, she submitted her report to the Minister of Transport, Élisabeth Borne.

== Political positions ==
In July 2019, Gayte voted in favor of the French ratification of the European Union’s Comprehensive Economic and Trade Agreement (CETA) with Canada.

== See also ==
- 2017 French legislative election
