= Christophe Euzet =

French politician

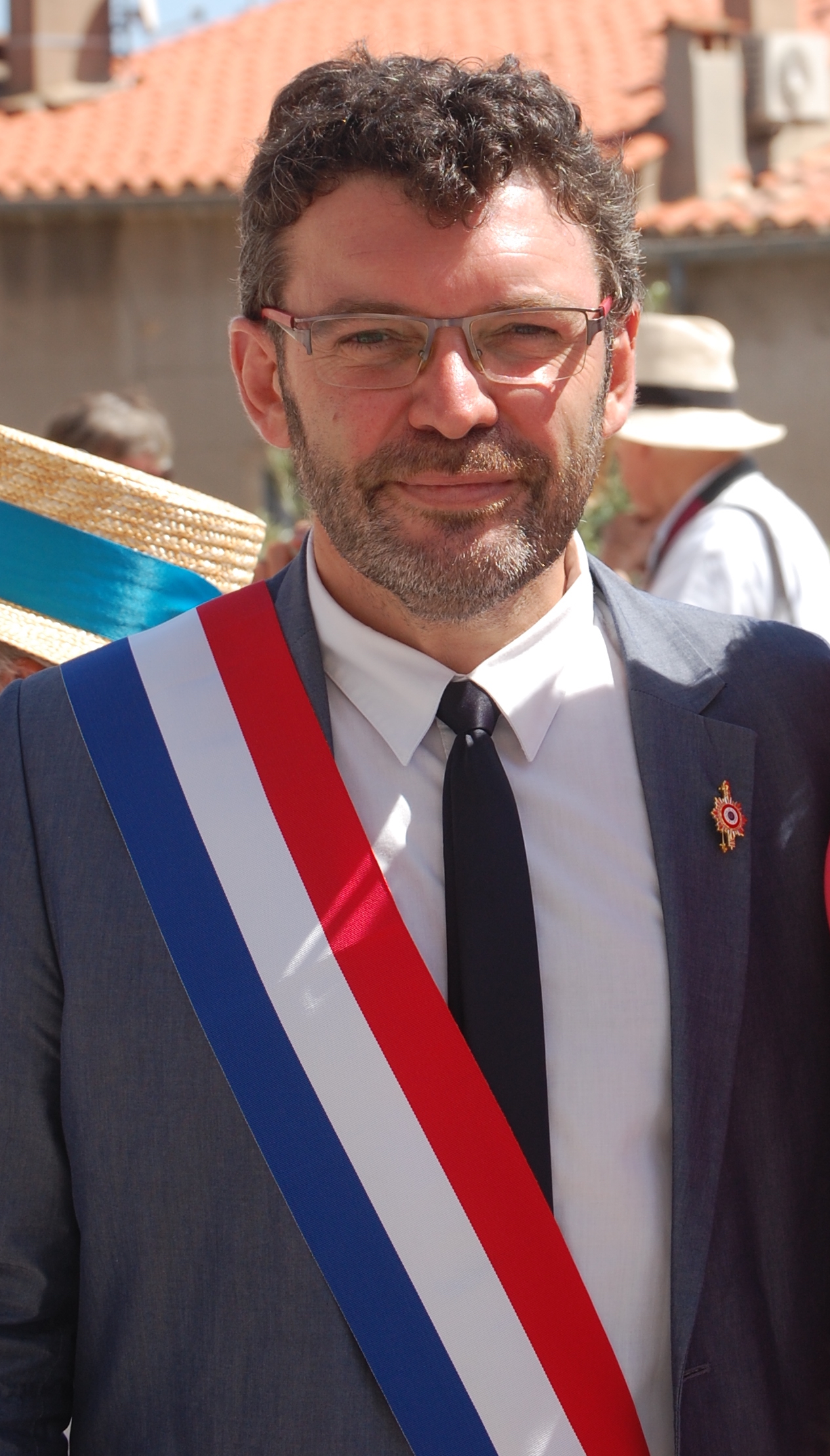

Member of the National Assembly for Hérault's 7th constituency
- In office 21 July 2017 – June 2022
- Preceded by: Sébastien Denaja
- Succeeded by: Aurélien Lopez-Liguori

Personal details
- Born: 2 April 1967 (age 59) Perpignan, France
- Party: Renaissance
- Education: Toulouse 1 University Capitole; University of Perpignan

Christophe Euzet (born 2 April 1967 in Perpignan) is a French politician who served as a member of the French National Assembly from 2017 to 2022, representing the 7th constituency of Hérault.

== Early life and education ==
Of Catalan origin by his mother, Sète by his father, Christophe Euzet comes from a popular background.

After obtaining his DEA then his doctorate in public law at the Toulouse 1 University Capitole, he became a lecturer at the University of Perpignan. He was Director of UFR at the International University Leopold S. Senghor of Alexandria in Egypt.

== Member of the National Assembly ==
Euzet was elected to the 7th constituency of Hérault on 18 June 2017. He won in the second round against the candidate of the National Front.

In the National Assembly, Euzet served on the Constitutional Acts, Legislation and General Administration Committee. He is also a Vice-President of the Promotion of tourist activities's Working Group. He is also a titular judge in the Cour de Justice de la République.

Euzet lost his seat in the 2022 French legislative election.
