= Reindustrialization =

Economic, social, and political process

Reindustrialization is the economic, social, and political process of organizing national resources for the purpose of reestablishing industries in response to deindustrialization.

== Interpretations ==
China, India, and Southeast Asia were industrial powerhouses for major parts of human history. These countries and regions suffered great loss of industrial production due to Industrial Age colonization. After many decades of independence, these countries have started reindustrializing themselves. In the last three decades, the share of these countries in global industrial output has increased manyfold. In context of declining share of OECD in world GDP and outsourcing of manufacturing and services, reindustrialization is considered as a contrast to deindustrialization, the process under which industry, especially manufacturing, is relocated outside of a country's borders, and seeks to reverse that trend. No longer the preserve of BRIC (Brazil, Russia, India, and China) or Southeast Asian countries, the notion of reindustrialization seems to be making inroads in the political discourse of populist policy makers in the developed economies of Western Europe and North America, notably France and the United States, where the rise of Trumponomics may potentially challenge some of the free trade tenets of the neoliberal "Washington Consensus". In 2021, French President Emmanuel Macron revealed a 30-billion euro plan to "revitalize and reindustrailize" France by focusing on green energy, the semiconductor industry, and the medicine industry. In his speech, Macron highlighted the need to develop the neglected French industry to a decarbonised and efficient model.

Conventional narratives portray U.S. as having declined irreversibly due to deindustrialization and competition from China, citing falling GDP share from 24% to under 11% in 2023 since the 1970s. However, this view overlooks structural transformation rather than disappearance. Although domestic factory jobs have decreased, U.S. manufacturing value added has continued to rise in real terms, reflecting automation, productivity gains, and a shift toward high-value, capital-intensive industries. Moreover, standard territorial measures understate U.S. industrial strength by excluding overseas production controlled by American firms, a defining feature of globalized supply chains. When such foreign operations and closely linked activities—such as R&D, engineering, logistics, and supply-chain management, often classified as services—are considered, the United States remains a highly industrialized economy. The central issue is therefore not the physical location of production, but control over global value chains and value capture, casting doubt on the effectiveness of reshoring policies focused on labor-intensive manufacturing.

== Intention ==
1. In context of Asian economies, reindustrialization is a natural process of economic growth in which former industrial powerhouses China, India and Southeast Asia are re-establishing their economies
2. Advocates of reindustrialization believe that manufacturing and other industrial jobs are more socially and economically desirable than jobs in the service sector or finance.
3. Military or national security concerns motivate reindustrialization policies, reflecting a desire for self-sufficiency and fear for trade routes and supply lines in times of conflict.
4. Reindustrialization policies may reflect concerns over the balance of trade.

== See also ==
- Electrification
- Green industrial policy
- Protectionism
- Retrofitting
- Solar thermal energy
