= Louis Aliot =

French politician (born 1969)

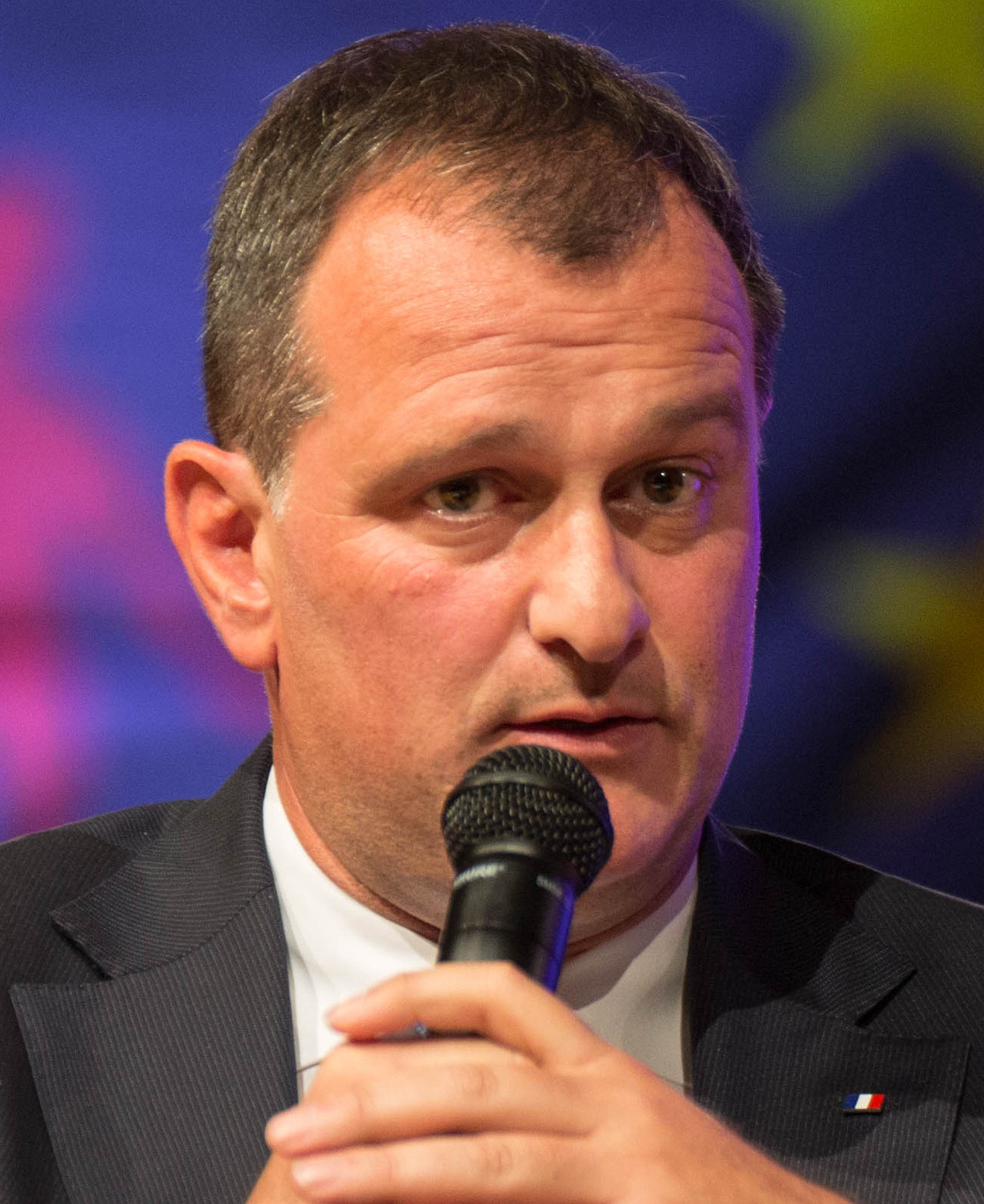
- Aliot in 2015

Mayor of Perpignan
- Incumbent
- Assumed office 3 July 2020
- Preceded by: Jean-Marc Pujol

Vice President of the National Rally
- In office 16 January 2011 – 11 March 2018

Member of the National Assembly for Pyrénées-Orientales's 2nd constituency
- In office 18 June 2017 – 3 July 2020

Regional Councillor
- In office 26 March 2010 – 15 December 2015
- Constituency: Languedoc-Roussillon
- In office 15 March 1998 – 21 March 2010
- Constituency: Midi-Pyrénées

Municipal councillor of Perpignan (66)
- Incumbent
- Assumed office 4 April 2014
- In office 23 March 2008 – 21 June 2009

Member of the European Parliament for West France
- In office 1 July 2014 – 21 July 2017

Personal details
- Born: 4 September 1969 (age 57) Toulouse, France
- Party: National Rally (since 1990)
- Spouse: Véronique Lopez (m. 2021)
- Domestic partner: Marine Le Pen (2009–2019)
- Children: 2
- Education: Toulouse 1 University Capitole
- Profession: Lawyer

Louis Aliot (French pronunciation: [lwi aljo]; born 4 September 1969) is a French politician and the vice president of the National Rally (previously named National Front) since 2011. A member of the FN Executive Office, Executive Committee and Central Committee, Aliot has been a regional councillor since 1998 (Midi-Pyrénées: 1998–2010, Languedoc-Roussillon: 2010–) and a municipal councillor of Perpignan (2008–2009). Louis Aliot has been the mayor of Perpignan since July 2020.

== Politics and elections (1998–2011) ==
Aliot was born in Toulouse, Haute-Garonne, to a family of ethnic French and Algerian Jewish heritage, who had resided in Algeria (Pied-noir). In the 1998 French regional elections, he was elected regional councillor of the Midi-Pyrénées and represented the department of Haute-Garonne for six years.

He then became a close collaborator of FN leader Jean-Marie Le Pen and played an active role in Le Pen's 2002 electoral campaign. He was sent to Perpignan to re-launch a divided and weakened FN federation.

In the 2004 regional elections, he led the FN list in the Midi-Pyrénées and polled 11.78% (141,598 votes) in the first round and 12.06% (149.417 votes) in the run-off with eight regional councillors elected. He has been the president of the FN group in the regional council for six years (2004–2010).

In the 2008 municipal elections, he led the FN list in Perpignan, polling 12.29% in the first round (4,543 votes) and 10.42% in the run-off (4,368 votes) with two municipal councillors elected. His result was one of the few good results for the FN, which suffered severe losses nationwide.

In the 2009 municipal by-election, he again led the FN list but lost his municipal seat in the first round (9.42%, 3,382 votes). Since June 2009, the FN is not represented in the municipal council of Perpignan. In order to take part in the run-off, a municipal list must cross the minimal threshold of 10% of the valid votes.

In the 2009 European elections, he led the FN list in the South-West France constituency. Polling 5.94% (155,806 votes), he was not elected as MEP.

In the 2010 regional elections, he led the departmental list in the Pyrénées-Orientales whereas France Jamet led the regional list in the Languedoc-Roussillon. Polling 13.64% (19,785 votes) in the first round, his list achieved 19.99% (30,581 votes) in the run-off with two councillors elected in the Pyrénées-Orientales. After having served for twelve years in the regional council of Midi-Pyrénées, he has been a regional councillor in the Languedoc-Roussillon since March 2010.

On 14 March 2011, Louis Aliot and Mario Borghezio MEP accompanied Marine Le Pen MEP during her stay in Lampedusa island. On 15 March 2011, they together took part in an international press conference in Rome.

In the 2011 cantonal elections, he was the FN candidate in the urban canton of Perpignan-9. Polling 34.61% (1,083 votes), he won the first round by a large margin. Despite an increase of 11.63% (514 votes) in the second round, he was defeated by the Socialist candidate supported by the UMP.

== Since 2012 ==
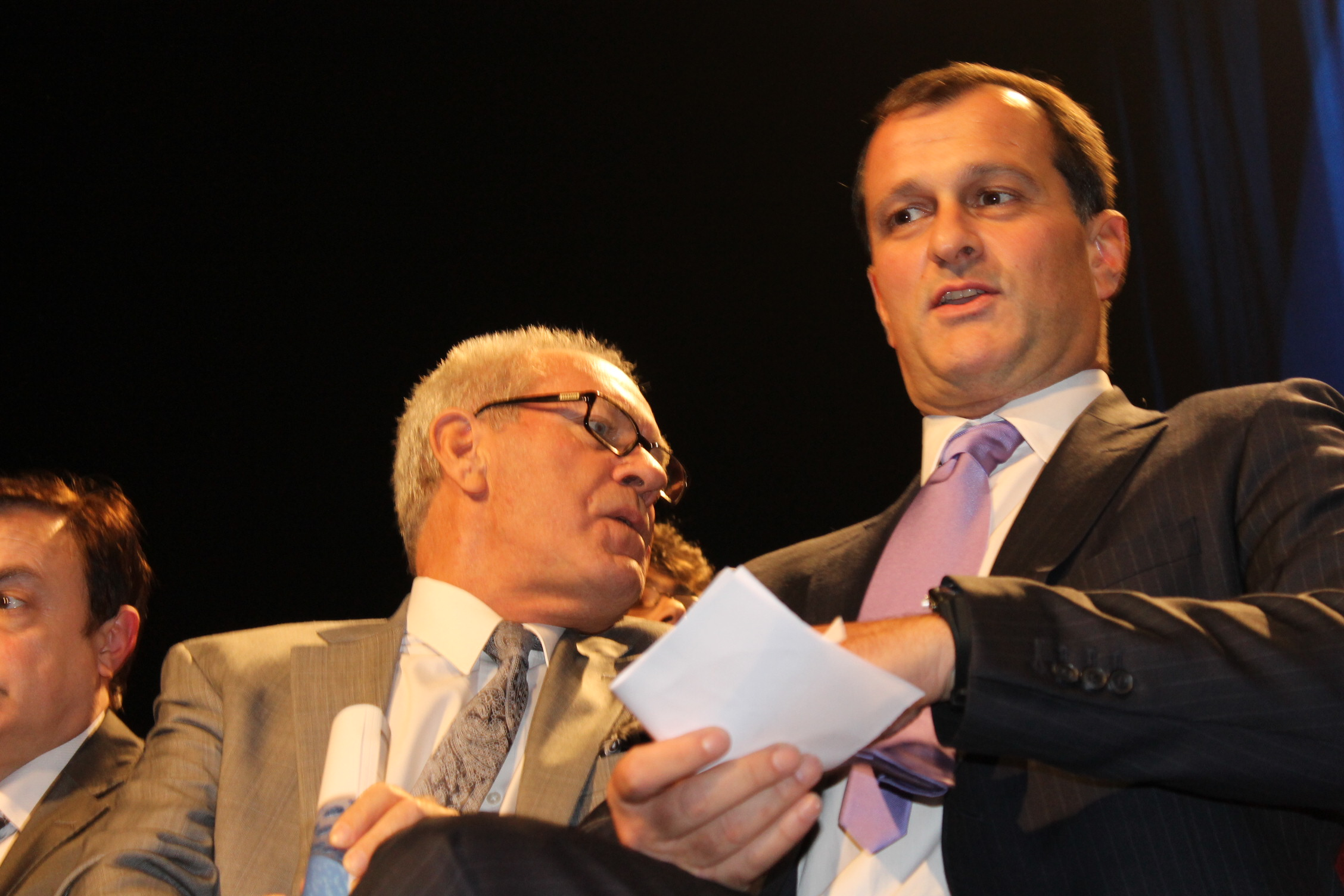
Louis Aliot in November 2011

During the 2012 presidential election, Aliot was the operational head of Marine Le Pen's campaign and one of her spokesmen. One of his most notable trips was to Israel in December 2011 to meet local politicians and French citizens to establish links.

He was, along with Florian Philippot, a spokesman for the party in the legislative elections. In the Pyrénées-Orientales' 1st constituency, he gathered 24.13% of votes in the first runoff, facing the candidates of the Union for a Popular Movement and the miscellaneous left, but he ended up in the third position with 23.24% in the second round; the candidate of the left won with 42.95%.

=== Municipal elections of 2020 in Perpignan ===
On 15 March, his list topped the first round with 35.65% of the vote, well ahead of the outgoing mayor, Jean-Marc Pujol (18.43%).

In June 2020, it was reported that Aliot won the mayor election in Perpignan with 54 percent of the vote versus 46 percent for the sitting conservative mayor, Jean-Marc Pujol. It would be the first time Marine Le Pen's party has won a city of more than 100,000 people. He was replaced in Parliament by his substitute, Catherine Pujol.

At his first city council meeting, he voted for a 17% increase in his salary (which corresponds to an increase of 60,000 euros over his entire term of office).

Running for re-election in the 2026 municipal elections, he was re-elected in the first round with 50.6% of the vote.

== Political mandates ==
- Regional councillor of Languedoc-Roussillon: since 26 March 2010
- Regional councillor of Midi-Pyrénées: 15 March 1998 – 21 March 2010 (leader of the FN group 2004–2010)
- Municipal councillor of Perpignan: 23 March 2008 – 21 June 2009
