= Results of the 2024 French legislative election in Loire =

Following the first round of the 2024 French legislative election on 30 June 2024, runoff elections in each constituency where no candidate received a vote share greater than 50 percent were scheduled for 7 July. Candidates permitted to stand in the runoff elections needed to either come in first or second place in the first round or achieve more than 12.5 percent of the votes of the entire electorate (as opposed to 12.5 percent of the vote share due to low turnout).

== Loire ==
=== 1st constituency ===
Candidate	Party or alliance		First round		Second round	
Candidate	Party or alliance		Votes	%	Votes	%
Pierrick Courbon	New Popular Front	Socialist Party	16,778	40.34	24,032	60.39
Marie Simon	National Rally		13,296	31.97	15,762	39.61
Quentin Bataillon	Ensemble	Renaissance	9,864	23.72		
Xavier Kemlin	Miscellaneous right	Independent	811	1.95		
Romain Brossard	Far-left	Lutte Ouvrière	473	1.14		
François Chord	Miscellaneous right	Sovereigntist right	366	0.88		
Total			41,588	100.00	39,794	100.00
Valid votes			41,588	98.03	39,794	93.16
Invalid votes			250	0.59	650	1.52
Blank votes			585	1.38	2,271	5.32
Total votes			42,423	100.00	42,715	100.00
Registered voters/turnout			63,963	66.32	63,990	66.75

=== 2nd constituency ===
Candidate	Party or alliance		First round		Second round	
Candidate	Party or alliance		Votes	%	Votes	%
Andrée Taurinya	New Popular Front	La France Insoumise	13,652	43.09	15,584	48.73
Hervé Breuil	National Rally		8,595	27.13	9,128	28.54
Eric Le Jaouen	Ensemble	Union of Democrats and Independents	7,310	23.08	7,268	22.73
Martial Mossmann	Miscellaneous centre	The Centrists	871	2.75		
Nathalie Douspis	Ecologists	Miscellaneous right	650	2.05		
Sophie Dieterich	Far-left	Lutte Ouvrière	439	1.39		
Quentin Fontvieille	Miscellaneous centre	Independent	162	0.51		
Total			31,679	100.00	31,980	100.00
Valid votes			31,679	97.98	31,980	97.96
Invalid votes			178	0.55	170	0.52
Blank votes			474	1.47	495	1.52
Total votes			32,331	100.00	32,645	100.00
Registered voters/turnout			50,889	63.53	50,910	64.12

=== 3rd constituency ===
Candidate	Party or alliance		First round		Second round	
Candidate	Party or alliance		Votes	%	Votes	%
Angélina La Marca	National Rally		22,813	40.89	24,604	44.54
Emmanuel Mandon	Ensemble	Democratic Movement	16,243	29.11	30,634	55.46
Vincent Bony	New Popular Front	Communist Party	15,254	27.34		
Rachid Daoud	Miscellaneous left	Independent	754	1.35		
Pauline Husseini	Far-left	Lutte Ouvrière	727	1.30		
Total			55,791	100.00	55,238	100.00
Valid votes			55,791	97.30	55,238	95.71
Invalid votes			240	0.42	388	0.67
Blank votes			1,310	2.28	2,086	3.61
Total votes			57,341	100.00	57,712	100.00
Registered voters/turnout			84,404	67.94	84,428	68.36

=== 4th constituency ===
Candidate	Party or alliance		First round		Second round	
Candidate	Party or alliance		Votes	%	Votes	%
Gerbert Rambaud	National Rally		28,753	40.80	30,903	44.58
Sylvie Bonnet	The Republicans		21,649	30.72	38,420	55.42
Bernard Paemelaere	New Popular Front	La France Insoumise	18,700	26.54		
Nora Ibbari	Far-left	Lutte Ouvrière	1,368	1.94		
Total			70,470	100.00	69,323	100.00
Valid votes			70,470	97.28	69,323	95.56
Invalid votes			458	0.63	731	1.01
Blank votes			1,513	2.09	2,493	3.44
Total votes			72,441	100.00	72,547	100.00
Registered voters/turnout			104,493	69.33	104,529	69.40

=== 5th constituency ===
Candidate	Party or alliance		First round		Second round	
Candidate	Party or alliance		Votes	%	Votes	%
Antoine Vermorel-Marques	The Republicans		29,832	41.99	36,613	51.11
Sandrine Granger	National Rally		25,644	36.09	26,893	37.54
Ismaël Stevenson	New Popular Front	La France Insoumise	13,039	18.35	8,130	11.35
Florence Nayme	Ecologists	Independent	956	1.35		
Edith Roche	Far-left	Lutte Ouvrière	726	1.02		
Robert Lachaud	Reconquête		614	0.86		
Yann Esteveny	Far-right	Independent	239	0.34		
Total			71,050	100.00	71,636	100.00
Valid votes			71,050	97.68	71,636	97.84
Invalid votes			497	0.68	446	0.61
Blank votes			1,187	1.63	1,132	1.55
Total votes			72,734	100.00	73,214	100.00
Registered voters/turnout			101,589	71.60	101,607	72.06

=== 6th constituency ===
Candidate	Party or alliance		First round		Second round	
Candidate	Party or alliance		Votes	%	Votes	%
Grégoire Granger	National Rally		31,016	39.71	34,627	44.83
Jean-Pierre Taite	The Republicans		21,724	27.81	42,621	55.17
Marie-Paule Olive	New Popular Front	La France Insoumise	13,472	17.25		
Alexandre Silva	Miscellaneous centre	Renaissance	9,721	12.45		
Yves Petiot	Far-left	Lutte Ouvrière	720	0.92		
Norbert Trichard	Far-left	Independent	502	0.64		
Sandra Haury	Ecologists	Independent	480	0.61		
Yvan Guy Mercier	Reconquête		470	0.60		
Total			78,105	100.00	77,248	100.00
Valid votes			78,105	97.35	77,248	95.72
Invalid votes			581	0.72	957	1.19
Blank votes			1,548	1.93	2,496	3.09
Total votes			80,234	100.00	80,701	100.00
Registered voters/turnout			111,857	71.73	111,870	72.14
