= Julien Borowczyk =

French politician

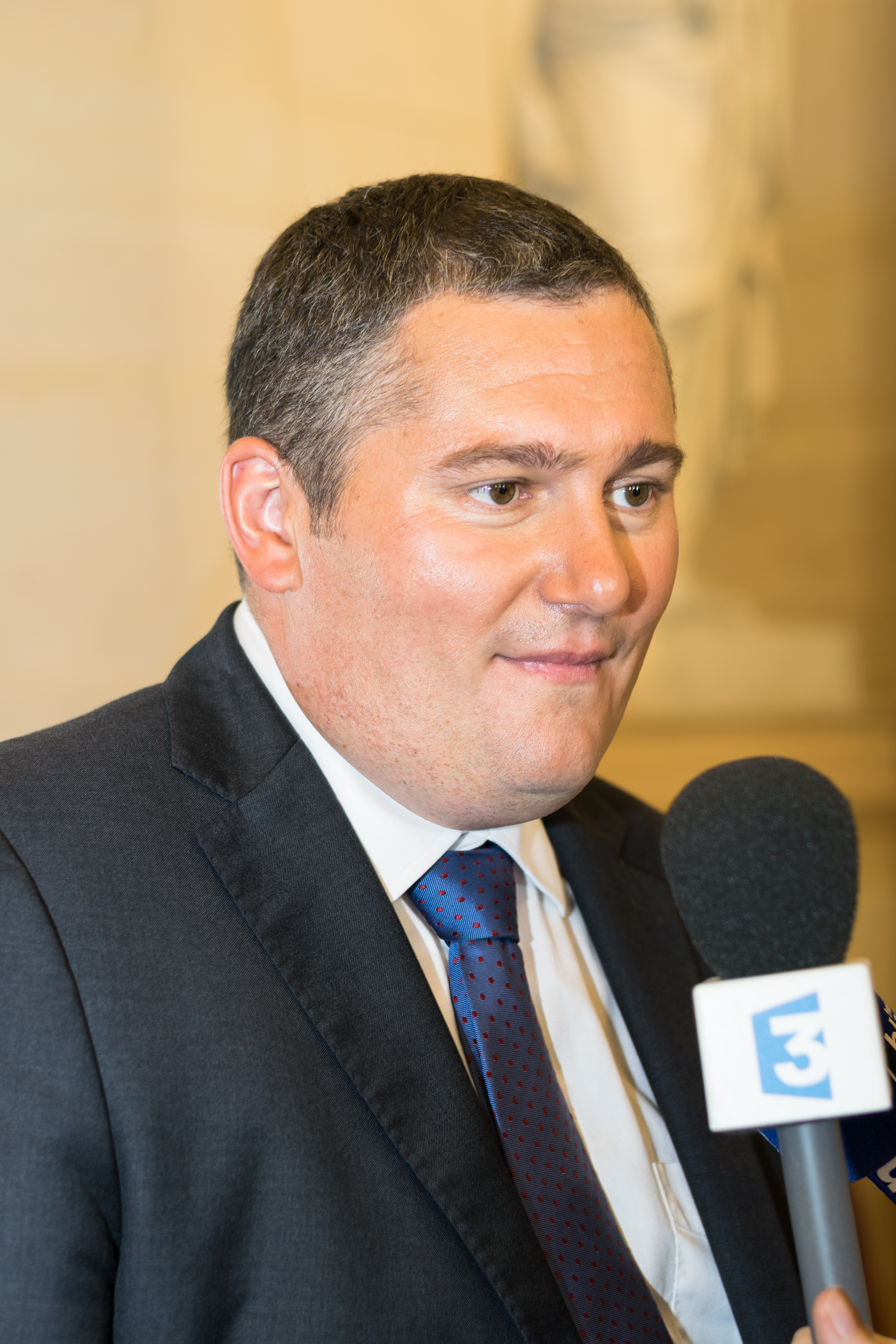

Member of the National Assembly for Loire's 6th constituency
- In office 21 June 2017 – 21 June 2022
- Preceded by: Paul Salen
- Succeeded by: Jean-Pierre Taite

Personal details
- Born: 2 May 1979 (age 46) Montbrison, France
- Party: La République En Marche!
- Occupation: Physician

Julien Borowczyk (born 2 May 1979) is a French physician and politician of La République En Marche! (LREM) who has been serving as a member of the French National Assembly from the 2017 elections to the 2022 ones, representing the department of Loire.

== Political career ==
In parliament, Borowczyk serves as member of the Committee on Social Affairs. In 2020, he also chaired a parliamentary inquiry into the government's response to the COVID-19 pandemic in France.

In addition to his committee assignments, Borowsczyk is part of the parliamentary friendship group with Madagascar.

In the 2022 French legislative election, he lost his seat to Republican Jean-Pierre Taite.

== Political positions ==
In July 2019, Borowczyk decided not to align with his parliamentary group's majority and became one of 52 LREM members who abstained from a vote on the French ratification of the European Union’s Comprehensive Economic and Trade Agreement (CETA) with Canada.

In a joint open letter with Bertrand Sorre and Grégory Galbadon which was published in Le Point in October 2019, Borowczyk defended the controversial decisions to have the 2019 World Athletics Championships and the 2022 FIFA World Cup take place in Qatar.

== See also ==
- 2017 French legislative election
