= Dino Cinieri =

French politician (born 1955)

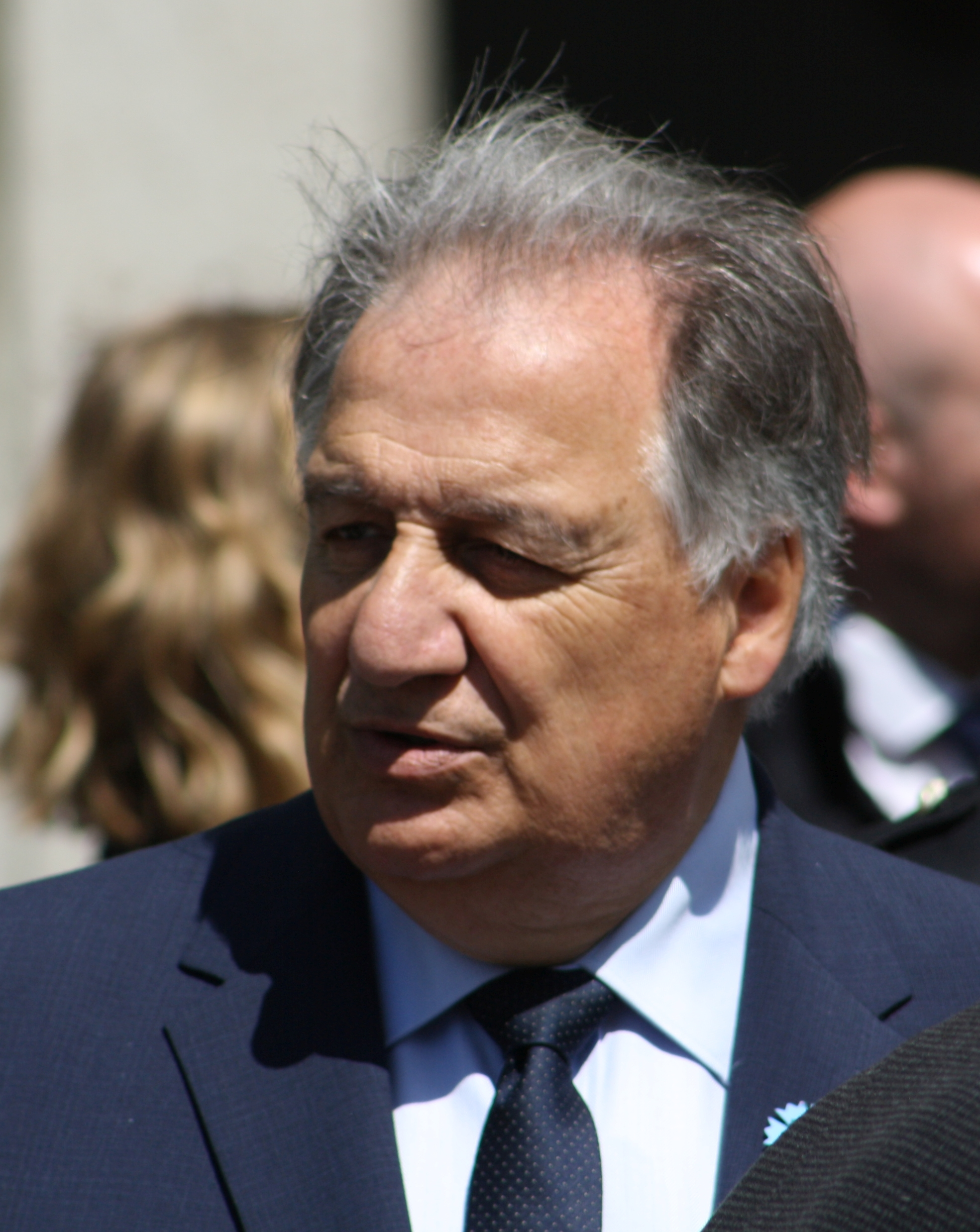
- Dino Cinieri in 2024

Member of the Regional Council of Auvergne-Rhône-Alpes
- Incumbent
- Assumed office 4 January 2016
- President: Laurent Wauquiez

Member of the National Assembly for Loire's 4th constituency
- In office 19 June 2002 – 30 November 2023
- Preceded by: Bernard Outin
- Succeeded by: Sylvie Bonnet

Personal details
- Born: 9 July 1955 (age 70) Firminy, France
- Party: The Republicans

Dino Cinieri (born 9 July 1955 in Firminy, Loire) is a French politician of the Republicans (LR) who serves as a member of the National Assembly of France, representing the Loire department.

Ahead of the 2022 presidential elections, Cinieri publicly declared his support for Michel Barnier as the Republicans’ candidate. In the run-up to the Republicans’ 2022 convention, he endorsed Éric Ciotti as the party's chairman.
