= Loire's 6th constituency =

Constituency of the National Assembly of France

6th constituency of Loire
- inline Constituency of the National Assembly of France

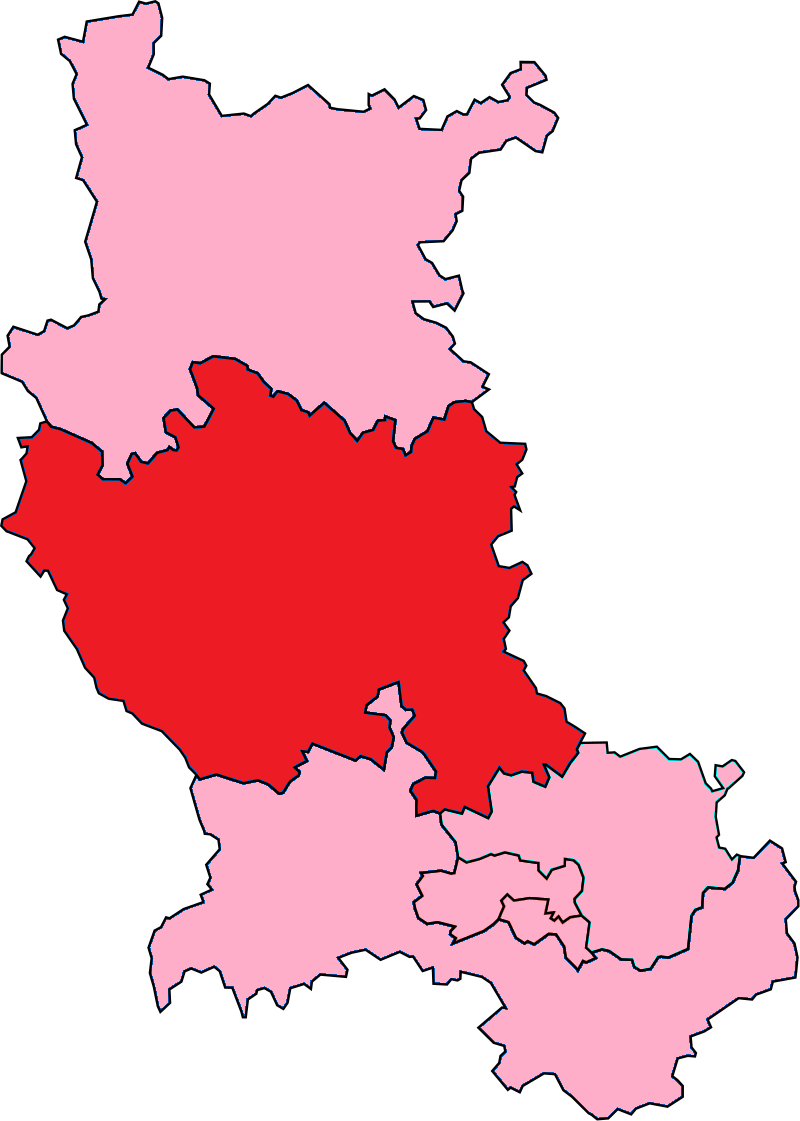
- Loire's's 6th Constituency shown within Loire

- Location of Loire in France
- Deputy: Jean-Pierre Taite; LR
- Department: Loire
- Cantons: Boën, Chazelles-sur-Lyon, Feurs, Montbrison, Néronde, Noirétable, Saint-Galmier, Saint-Georges-en-Couzan, Saint-Germain-Laval
- Registered voters: 107615

The 6th constituency of the Loire (French: Sixième circonscription de la Loire) is a French legislative constituency in the Loire département. Like the other 576 French constituencies, it elects one MP using a two round electoral system.

== Description ==
The 6th constituency of the Loire covers the central parts of the department to the north of Saint-Etienne.

Long serving conservative deputy Pascal Clément stepped down at the 2012 election, his successor, Paul Salen was defeated in 2017 in the second round run off by Julien Borowczyk of En Marche!

== Assembly Members ==
Election	Member	Party	Notes
1958	Georges Bidault	DVD	
1962	Paul Rivière	DVD	
1967	Paul Rivière	UDR	
1968	Paul Rivière	UDR	
1973	Paul Rivière	UDR	
1978	Pascal Clément	UDF	
1981	Pascal Clément	UDF	
1986	Proportional representation by department		
1988	Pascal Clément	UDF	
1993	Jacques Cyprès	UDF	substitute for Pascal Clément, replaced Clément while he was minister for relations with parliament
1995	Pascal Clément	UDF	
1997	Pascal Clément	UDF	
2002	Pascal Clément	UMP	
2005	Liliane Vaginay	UMP	substitute for Pascal Clément, replaced Clément while he was Minister of Justice
2007	Pascal Clément	UMP	
2012	Paul Salen	UMP	
2017	Julien Borowczyk	LREM	
2022	Jean-Pierre Taite	LR	
2024	Jean-Pierre Taite	LR	

== Election results ==
=== 2024 ===
Candidate	Party	Alliance	First round			Second round		
Candidate	Party	Alliance	Votes	%	+/–	Votes	%	+/–
Grégorie Granger	RN		31,016	39.71	+18.83	34,627	44.83	new
Jean-Pierre Taite	LR	UDC	21,724	27.81	+2.45	42,621	55.17	-0.57
Marie-Paule Olive	LFI	NFP	13,472	17.25	-1.74			
Alexandre Silva	REN	Ensemble	9,721	12.45	-13.98			
Yves Petoit	LO		720	0.92	-0.15			
Norbert Trichard	EXG		502	0.64	new			
Sandra Haury	ECO		480	0.61	new			
Yvan Guy-Mercier	REC		470	0.60	-3.46			
Votes			78,105	100.00		77,248	100.00	
Valid votes			78,105	97.35	-0.64	77,248	95.72	+5.39
Blank votes			1,548	1.93	+0.44	2,496	3.09	-4.34
Null votes			581	0.72	+0.19	957	1.19	-1.05
Turnout			80,234	71.73	+21.04	80,701	72.14	+27.39
Abstentions			31,623	28.27	-21.04	31,169	27.86	-27.39
Registered voters			111,857			111,870		
Result			LR HOLD					

=== 2022 ===
Legislative Election 2022: Loire's 6th constituency
Party	Candidate	Votes	%	±%
HOR (Ensemble)	Julien Borowczyk	14,590	26.43	-11.01
LR (UDC)	Jean-Pierre Taite	14,001	25.36	+2.75
RN	Grégoire Granger	11,527	20.88	+3.68
LFI (NUPÉS)	Marie-Paule Olive	10,482	18.99	+4.40
REC	Maylis Perrot	2,240	4.06	N/A
Others	N/A	2,362	-	−
Turnout		55,202	50.69	+0.67
2nd round result
LR (UDC)	Jean-Pierre Taite	25,050	55.74	+12.61
HOR (Ensemble)	Julien Borowczyk	19,891	44.26	−12.61
Turnout		44,941	44.74	+3.00
LR gain from LREM		Swing	+12.61	

=== 2017 ===
Candidate	Label	First round		Second round	
Candidate	Label	Votes	%	Votes	%
Julien Borowczyk	REM	19,821	37.44	23,055	56.87
Paul Salen	LR	11,973	22.61	17,485	43.13
Sophie Robert	FN	9,105	17.20		
Sadia Nadia Seghir	FI	4,700	8.88		
Jean Duverger	ECO	3,024	5.71		
Nicolas Poirieux	DVD	1,837	3.47		
Marie Goncalves	DLF	1,010	1.91		
Cécile Maisonnette	EXG	455	0.86		
Bernard Chuzeville	ECO	423	0.80		
Ludovic Vaginay	DIV	358	0.68		
Michel Cuenin	DIV	238	0.45		
Votes		52,944	100.00	40,540	100.00
Valid votes		52,944	98.36	40,540	90.26
Blank votes		634	1.18	3,079	6.86
Null votes		248	0.46	1,295	2.88
Turnout		53,826	50.02	44,914	41.74
Abstentions		53,790	49.98	62,701	58.26
Registered voters		107,616		107,615	
Source: Ministry of the Interior

=== 2012 ===
2012 legislative election in Loire's 6th constituency
Candidate	Party	First round		Second round	
Candidate	Party	Votes	%	Votes	%
Paul Salen	UMP	22,618	36.68%	31,503	53.35%
Liliane Faure	PS	21,891	35.50%	27,549	46.65%
Sophie Robert	FN	12,394	20.10%		
Nicole Bietrix	FG	2,052	3.33%		
Leïssane Stefanoff	DLR	697	1.13%		
Laurène Martin	??	609	0.99%		
Bernard Chuzeville	AEI	480	0.78%		
Guy Ravot	MEI	322	0.52%		
Cécile Maisonnette	LO	315	0.51%		
Christian Banliat		293	0.48%		
Valid votes		61,671	98.46%	59,052	97.09%
Spoilt and null votes		962	1.54%	1,770	2.91%
Votes cast / turnout		62,633	60.23%	60,822	58.49%
Abstentions		41,358	39.77%	43,168	41.51%
Registered voters		103,991	100.00%	103,990	100.00%

=== 2007 ===
Legislative Election 2007: Loire's 6th constituency
Party	Candidate	Votes	%	±%
UMP	Pascal Clement	19,231	47.23	
PS	Dominique Fruleux	7,778	19.10	
MoDem	Nicolas Poirieux	3,957	9.72	
FN	Sophie Robert	2,644	6.49	
LV	Jean Duverger	1,503	3.69	
DIV	Francis Gruzelle	1,275	3.13	
EXG	Patricia Ospelt	1,125	2.76	
PCF	Georges Suzan	1,117	2.74	
Others	N/A	2,086	-	−
Turnout		41,631	59.93	
2nd round result
UMP	Pascal Clement	22,401	60.51	
PS	Dominique Fruleux	14,617	39.49	
Turnout		39,063	56.23	
UMP hold				

=== 2002 ===
Legislative Election 2002: Loire's 6th constituency
Party	Candidate	Votes	%	±%
UMP	Pascal Clément	20,691	50.12	
PS	Dominique Fruleux	8,966	21.72	
FN	Cyprien Bertrand-Magat	5,552	13.45	
PCF	Christine Chevillard	1,884	4.56	
LV	Jean-Marc Di Battista	969	2.35	
Others	N/A	3,221	-	−
Turnout		42.356	64.59	
UMP gain from PR				

=== 1997 ===
Legislative Election 2022:
Party	Candidate	Votes	%	±%
PR (UDF)	Pascal Clément	16,191	39.64	
PS	Dominique Fruleux	10,318	25.26	
FN	Jean Suchel	6,560	16.06	
PCF	Maryse Poyet	3,342	8.18	
LDI	Sabine Pérouse	1,735	4.25	
GE	Régis Usson	1,458	3.57	
LV	Christian Prat	1,239	3.03	
Turnout		43,662	70.25	
2nd round result
PR (UDF)	Pascal Clément	22,991	55.36	
PS	Dominique Fruleux	18,539	44.64	
Turnout		44,380	71.40	
PR hold				
