= Bataillon =

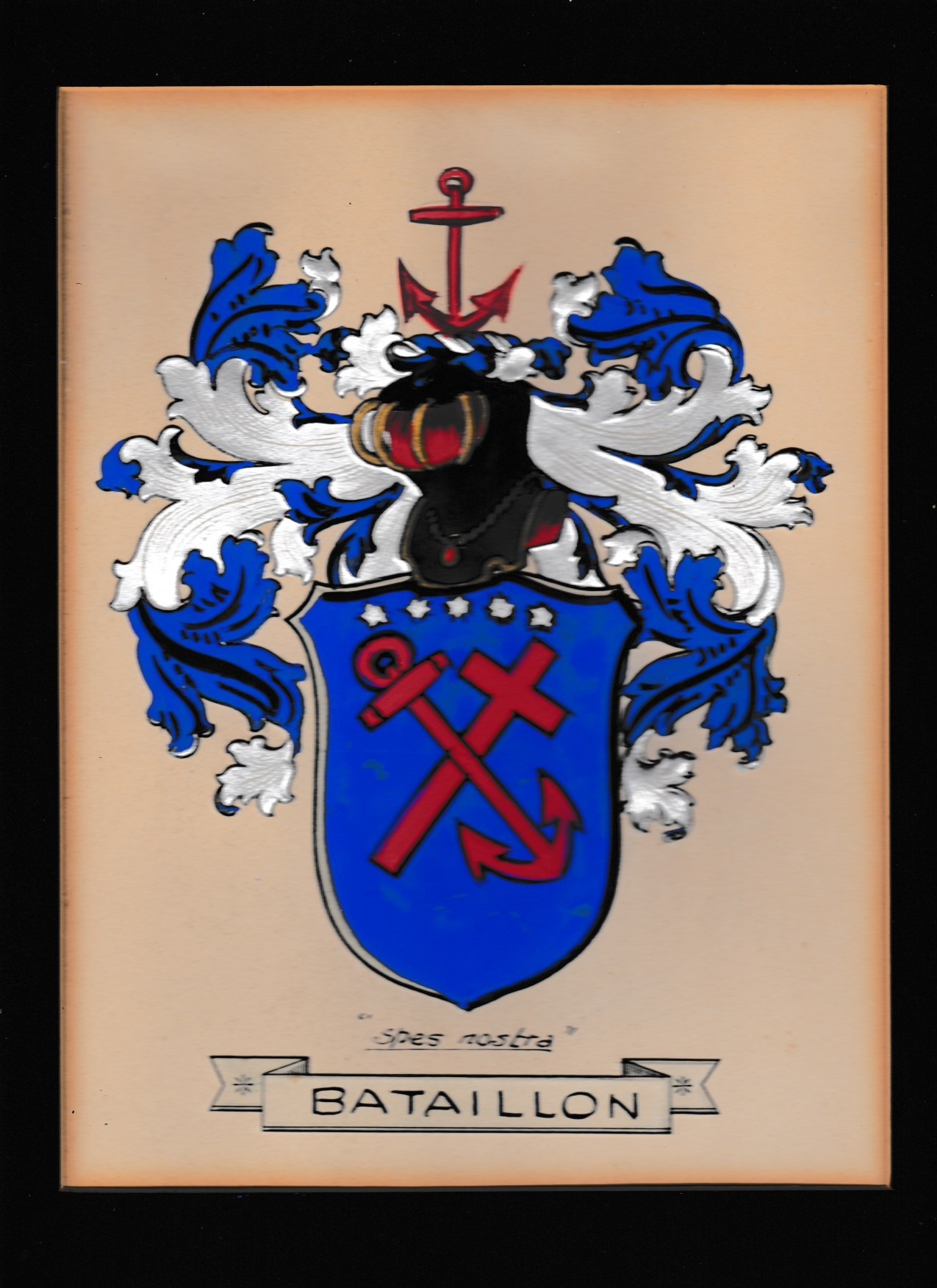
Coat Of Arms "Spes Nostra"

Bataillon is a surname of French origin. Notable people with the surname include:

- Jean Eugène Bataillon (1864–1953), French biologist
- Joseph Bataillon (born 1949), American judge
- Marcel Bataillon (1895–1977), French Hispanicist
- Quentin Bataillon (born 1993), French politician
