= Daniel Mandon =

French politician (1939–2023)

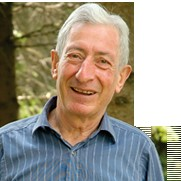
- Mandon in 2017

Member of the French National Assembly for Loire's 4th constituency
- In office 2 April 1993 – 21 April 1997
- Preceded by: Théo Vial-Massat
- Succeeded by: Bernard Outin

Mayor of Saint-Genest-Malifaux
- In office 1983–2014
- Preceded by: Laurent Béal
- Succeeded by: Vincent Ducreux

Personal details
- Born: 3 June 1939 Saint-Étienne, France
- Died: 9 June 2023 (aged 84) Saint-Genest-Malifaux, France
- Party: CDS; UDF
- Education: University of Paris
- Occupation: Teacher

Daniel Mandon (3 June 1939 – 9 June 2023) was a French teacher and politician of the Centre of Social Democrats (CDS) and the UDF.

== Biography ==
Born in Saint-Étienne on 3 June 1939, Mandon completed his secondary studies in his hometown before attending university in Lyon, Aix-en-Provence, and Paris. He completed a doctorate in sociology from the University of Paris and the School for Advanced Studies in the Social Sciences.

In 1977, Mandon was elected to the municipal council of Sant-Genest-Malifaux. He then became mayor in 1983. He also became a member of the General Council of Loire at the age of 39. In 1993, he was elected to the National Assembly as a member of the UDF. He defeated Communist Party member Charles Fiterman. He supported the Plan Juppé, 1995, as well as a moratorium on national service. His mandate in the National Assembly was interrupted by the "failed dissolution" in 1997.

As a general councillor, Mandon chaired the department's Conseil d'architecture, d'urbanisme et de l'environnement and served as vice-president of cultural affairs for many years. He also took on many local issues, such as the inconsistencies in drawing the boundaries of Saint-Étienne Métropole, local finances, housing, recreation, urbanism, and the rejection of industrial wind power near the Pilat Regional Natural Park. In 2014, he chose not to run for re-election.

Daniel Mandon died in Saint-Genest-Malifaux on 9 June 2023, at the age of 84.

== Publications ==
- Logos et passion chez Clément d'Alexandrie (1963)
- Milieu populaire et développement culturel (1970)
- Influence des communications de masse sur le suicide (1971)
- Thèse Paris Sorbonne : une ville ouvrière dans la crise culturelle (1972)
- Les Barbelés de la culture, Saint-Étienne, ville ouvrière (1976)
- Approche sociologique de l'hôpital: évolution et fonction sociale de l'institution hospitalière (1977)
- Drogue et civilisation (1979)
- Perspectives sociologiques sur les suicides (1981)
- Précis des toxicomanies (1984)
- Le nom et la nomination : source, sens et pouvoirs (1990)
- Culture et changement Social (1991)
- Une politique culturelle pour la Loire (1995)
- Trouble fête (2000)
- La Question identitaire territoriale; Saint-Étienne métamorphosée ? (2009)
- La Question laïque. Les chocs culturels stéphanois (2010)
- C'est la faute à Voltaire. Du bon usage des citations (2013)
- C'est la faute à Rousseau. Religion et politique : l'exception française (2015)
- De la modernité au culte républicain (2017)
- Le Département de la Loire et son Conseil général, un destin singulier (2018)
- Pilat en Lumière (2019)
- Santé et spiritualité. Sain et sauf : le mythe et la foi (2020)

== Distinctions ==
- Officer of the Ordre national du Mérite (2011)
- Knight of the Legion of Honour (1997)
- Commander of the Ordre des Palmes académiques
- Officer of the Order of Agricultural Merit
