= Loire's 1st constituency =

Constituency of the National Assembly of France

1st constituency of Loire
- inline Constituency of the National Assembly of France

- Constituency in Department

- Location of Loire in France
- Deputy: Pierrick Courbon; PS
- Department: Loire

The 1st constituency of Loire is one of six French legislative constituencies in the Loire department, in the Auvergne-Rhône-Alpes region.

It consists of the (pre-2014 cantonal re-organisation) cantons of Saint Étienne North-East 1 and 2 and Saint Étienne North-West 1 and 2. Its population was 111,405 at the 1999 census.

== Deputies ==
Election	Member	Party
1988	Jean-Pierre Philibert	UDF
1993	Jean-Pierre Philibert	UDF
1997	Gérard Lindeperg	PS
2002	Gilles Artigues	UDF
2007	Régis Juanico	PS
2012	Régis Juanico	PS
2017	Régis Juanico	PS
2017	Régis Juanico	G.s
2022	Quentin Bataillon	Agir
2024	Pierrick Courbon	PS

== Election results ==
=== 2024 ===
Candidate	Party	Alliance	First round			Second round		
Candidate	Party	Alliance	Votes	%	+/–	Votes	%	+/–
Pierrick Courbon	PS	NFP	16,778	40.34	+18.42	24,032	60.39	+12.49
Marie Simon	RN		13,296	31.97	+13.84	15,762	39.61	new
Quentin Bataillon	REN	Ensemble	9,864	23.72	+0.22	withdrew		
Xavier Kemlin	DVD		811	1.95	new			
Romain Brossard	LO		473	1.14	+0.50			
François Chord	DSV		366	0.88	new			
Votes			41,588	100.00		39,794	100.00	
Valid votes			41,588	98.03	-0.76	39,794	93.16	+0.82
Blank votes			585	1.38	+0.51	2,271	5.32	+0.22
Null votes			250	0.59	+0.25	650	1.52	-1.03
Turnout			42,423	66.32	+21.33	42,715	66.75	+24.19
Abstentions			21,540	33.68	-21.33	21,275	33.25	-24.19
Registered voters			63,963			63,990		
Result			PS GAIN FROM AGIR					

=== 2022 ===
Legislative Election 2022: Loire's 1st constituency
Party	Candidate	Votes	%	±%
Agir (Ensemble)	Quentin Bataillon	6,746	23.50	-11.31
EELV (NUPÉS)	Laetitia Copin	6,487	22.60	-9.08
DVG	Pierrick Courbon*	6,292	21.92	N/A
RN	Marie Simon	5,203	18.13	+4.73
REC	Samia Dussart	1,400	4.88	N/A
UDI (UDC)	Alexia Ostyn	1,288	4.49	−1.66
Others	N/A	1,290	-	−
Turnout		28,706	44.99	+0.79
2nd round result
Agir (Ensemble)	Quentin Bataillon	13,231	52.10	+2.15
EELV (NUPÉS)	Laetitia Copin*	12,166	47.90	−2.15
Turnout		25,397	42.56	+4.42
Agir gain from PS		Swing	+2.15	

* Courbon stood as a dissident PS member, without the support of the NUPES alliance, of which PS is a member. As PS were in alliance with all NUPES candidates, the PS results from 2017 are included in swing calculations for the NUPES candidate in both rounds.

=== 2017 ===
Candidate	Label	First round		Second round	
Candidate	Label	Votes	%	Votes	%
Magalie Viallon	REM	9,946	34.81	11,521	49.95
Régis Juanico	PS	5,500	19.25	11,544	50.05
Gilles Artigues	UDI	4,614	16.15		
Philippe Clause	FN	3,827	13.40		
Corinne Oumakhlouf	FI	2,857	10.00		
Lucas Winiarski	PCF	695	2.43		
Mohamed Abdirahman	PRG	358	1.25		
Romain Brossard	EXG	206	0.72		
Andrée Rousson	EXD	168	0.59		
Samar El Husseini	DIV	139	0.49		
Loïc Le Sauder	DIV	89	0.31		
Bernard Sirot	EXG	88	0.31		
Mourad Hamlaoui	DIV	83	0.29		
Bénédicte Place	DVD	0	0.00		
Votes		28,570	100.00	23,065	100.00
Valid votes		28,570	98.47	23,065	92.12
Blank votes		332	1.14	1,423	5.68
Null votes		111	0.38	549	2.19
Turnout		29,013	44.20	25,037	38.14
Abstentions		36,634	55.80	40,608	61.86
Registered voters		65,647		65,645	
Source: Ministry of the Interior

=== 2012 ===
2012 legislative election in Loire's 1st constituency
Candidate	Party	First round		Second round	
Candidate	Party	Votes	%	Votes	%
Régis Juanico	PS	15,274	41.79%	19,357	57.45%
Gilles Artigues	MoDem	9,340	25.55%	14,336	42.55%
Raphaëlle Jeanson	FN	6,930	18.96%		
Maryse Bianchin	FG	2,102	5.75%		
Dominique Joubert	EELV	1,109	3.03%		
Eric Berlivet	PLD	709	1.94%		
Edmond Hube		407	1.11%		
Clémentine Vignal	NPA	223	0.61%		
Yann Nussbaum		187	0.51%		
Romain Brossard	LO	143	0.39%		
Evelyne Barge	AEI	126	0.34%		
Valid votes		36,550	99.05%	33,693	96.89%
Spoilt and null votes		349	0.95%	1,083	3.11%
Votes cast / turnout		36,899	54.27%	34,776	51.14%
Abstentions		31,098	45.73%	33,219	48.86%
Registered voters		67,997	100.00%	67,995	100.00%

=== 2007 ===
Legislative Election 2007: Loire's 1st constituency
Party	Candidate	Votes	%	±%
UMP	Françoise Grossetete	12,937	35.06	
PS	Régis Juanico	7,969	21.59	
MoDem	Gilles Artigues	7,678	20.81	
FN	Charles Perrot	2,151	5.83	
PCF	Alain Pecel	2,123	5.75	
LV	Catherine Herbertz	936	2.54	
EXG	Florence Hirsch	899	2.44	
Others	N/A	2,210		
Turnout		37,369	54.21	
2nd round result
PS	Régis Juanico	18,922	52.13	
UMP	Françoise Grossetete	17,373	47.87	
Turnout		37,438	54.31	
PS gain from UDF				

=== 2002 ===
Legislative Election 2002: Loire's 1st constituency
Party	Candidate	Votes	%	±%
PS	Gérard Lindenperg	13,923	35.44	
UDF	Gilles Artigues	12,942	32.94	
FN	Charles Perrot	6,703	17.06	
DVD	Edmond Hubé	1,965	5.00	
PR	Guy Laforie	1,650	4.20	
Others	N/A	2,106		
Turnout		39,926	60.05	
2nd round result
UDF	Gilles Artigues	18,312	51.86	
PS	Gérard Lindenperg	16,998	48.14	
Turnout		36,484	54.87	
UDF gain from PS				

=== 1997 ===
Legislative Election 1997: Loire's 1st constituency
Party	Candidate	Votes	%	±%
PR (UDF)	Jean-Pierre Philibert	11,293	27.89	
PS	Gérard Lindeperg	11,062	27.32	
FN	Gérard Tournaire	9,614	23.74	
PCF	Alain Pecel	4,243	10.48	
MEI	Yves Scaviner	1,280	3.16	
LO	Guy Largeron	1,200	2.96	
LDI	Marie-Joëlle Moreau	1,082	2.67	
MRC	Pascale Faure	722	1.78	
Turnout		42,128	62.12	
2nd round result
PS	Gérard Lindeperg	20,012	43.89	
PR (UDF)	Jean-Pierre Philibert	18,256	40.04	
FN	Gérard Tournaire	7,332	16.08	
Turnout		46,829	69.05	
PS gain from PR				
