= Pierrick Courbon =

French politician (born 1985)

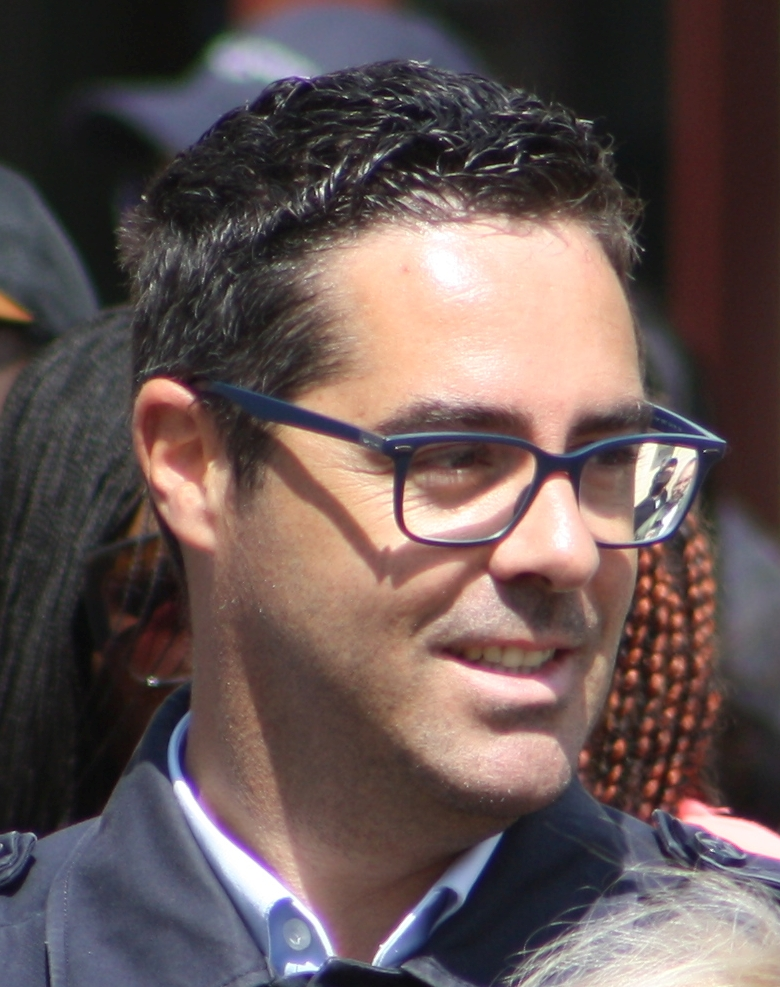
- Courbon in 2024

Member of the French National Assembly for Loire's 1st constituency
- Incumbent
- Assumed office 18 July 2024
- Preceded by: Quentin Bataillon

Personal details
- Born: 8 July 1985 (age 40); Firminy, France
- Political party: Socialist Party (since 2008)

Pierrick Courbon (born 8 July 1985) is a French politician of the Socialist Party who was elected member of the National Assembly for Loire's 1st constituency in 2024. He serves as a member of the Departmental Council of Loire and the municipal council of Saint-Étienne, and was a parliamentary assistant to Régis Juanico. He contested Loire's 1st constituency in the 2022 election.
