= Loire's 4th constituency =

Constituency of the National Assembly of France

4th constituency of Loire
- inline Constituency of the National Assembly of France

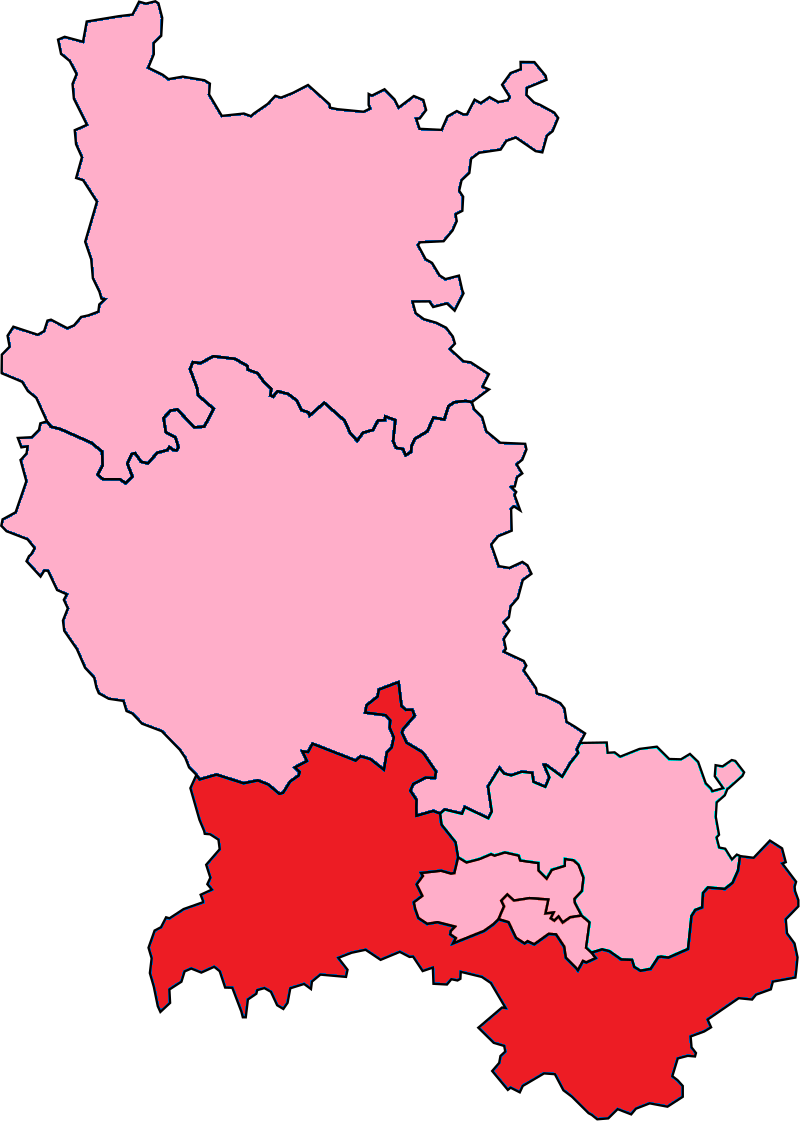
- Loire's's 4th Constituency shown within Loire
- Deputy: Sylvie Bonnet; LR
- Department: Loire
- Cantons: Bourg-Argental, Le Chambon-Feugerolles, Firminy, Pélussin, Saint-Genest-Malifaux, Saint-Bonnet-le-Château, Saint-Just-Saint-Rambert, Saint-Jean-Soleymieux
- Registered voters: 101108

The 4th constituency of the Loire (French: Quatrième circonscription de la Loire) is a French legislative constituency in the Loire département. Like the other 576 French constituencies, it elects one MP using a two round electoral system.

== Description ==
The 4th constituency of the Loire lies to the south of Saint-Etienne in the south of the department.

The seat has generally favoured candidates from the centre-right however in both 1988 and 1997 the voters opted for a Communist Party deputy. Since 2002 the seat has reliably conservative although incumbent Dino Cinieri held on by only 99 votes in 2017.

== Assembly members ==
Election	Member	Party
1988	Théo Vial-Massat	PCF
1993	Daniel Mandon	UDF
1997	Bernard Outin	PCF
2002	Dino Cinieri	UMP
2007	Dino Cinieri	UMP
2012	Dino Cinieri	UMP
2017	Dino Cinieri	LR
2022	Dino Cinieri	LR
2024	Sylvie Bonnet	LR

== Election results ==
=== 2024 ===
Candidate	Party	Alliance	First round			Second round		
Candidate	Party	Alliance	Votes	%	+/–	Votes	%	+/–
Gerbert Rambaud	RN		28,753	40.80	+19.18	30,903	44.58	new
Sylvie Bonnet	LR	UDC	21,649	30.72	+4.91	38,420	55.42	-6.19
Bernard Paemelaere	LFI	NFP	18,700	26.54	+2.98	withdrew		
Nora Ibbari	LO		1,368	1.94	+0.86			
Votes			70,470	100.00		69,323	100.00	
Valid votes			70,470	97.28	-0.98	69,323	95.56	+1.20
Blank votes			1,513	2.09	+0.80	2,493	3.44	-0.75
Null votes			458	0.63	+0.18	731	1.01	-0.44
Turnout			72,441	69.33	+21.53	72,547	69.40	+23.34
Abstentions			32,052	30.67	-21.53	31,982	30.60	-23.34
Registered voters			104,493			104,529		
Result			LR HOLD					

=== 2022 ===
Legislative Election 2022: Loire's 4th constituency
Party	Candidate	Votes	%	±%
LR (UDC)	Dino Cinieri	12,601	25.81	+2.90
LFI (NUPÉS)	Bernard Paemelaere	11,501	23.56	+0.40
RN	Anthony Gibert	10,555	21.62	+7.53
LREM (Ensemble)	Shannon Seban	8,224	16.84	−13.60
REC	Jean-Baptiste Rouquerol	1,930	3.95	N/A
DVE	Pascal Thomas	1,177	2.41	+2.41
PRG	Sana Belmouden	975	2.00	N/A
Others	N/A	1,863	-	−
Turnout		48,826	47.80	−1.30
2nd round result
LR (UDC)	Dino Cinieri	27,847	61.61	+11.48
LFI (NUPÉS)	Bernard Paemelaere	17,352	38.39	N/A
Turnout		45,199	46.06	+4.09
LR hold				

=== 2017 ===
Candidate	Label	First round		Second round	
Candidate	Label	Votes	%	Votes	%
David Kauffer	REM	14,880	30.44	18,940	49.87
Dino Cinieri	LR	11,199	22.91	19,039	50.13
Raphaëlle Jeanson	FN	7,835	16.03		
Léo Chavas	FI	5,206	10.65		
Christophe Faverjon	PCF	5,108	10.45		
Olivier Joly	DVD	2,431	4.97		
Gérard Guillaumin	ECO	1,005	2.06		
Patrick Mignon	DLF	638	1.31		
Françoise Leclet	EXG	386	0.79		
Jean-Christophe Debens	DIV	193	0.39		
Pascal Thomas	ECO	0	0.00		
François Shematsi	EXD	0	0.00		
Votes		48,881	100.00	37,979	100.00
Valid votes		48,881	98.47	37,979	89.51
Blank votes		556	1.12	3,306	7.79
Null votes		203	0.41	1,145	2.70
Turnout		49,640	49.10	42,430	41.97
Abstentions		51,460	50.90	58,678	58.03
Registered voters		101,100		101,108	
Source: Ministry of the Interior

=== 2012 ===
2012 legislative election in Loire's 4th constituency
Candidate	Party	First round		Second round	
Candidate	Party	Votes	%	Votes	%
Dino Cinieri	UMP	19,227	33.08%	24,528	41.96%
Léla Bencharif	EELV	12,979	22.33%	23,195	39.68%
Robert Heyraud	FN	12,405	21.35%	10,731	18.36%
Christophe Faverjon	FG	9,982	17.18%		
Jean-Claude Reymond	PRG	1,566	2.69%		
Jacques Berlioz	DLR	1,001	1.72%		
Odile Cote	LO	430	0.74%		
Pascal-Simon Thomas-Bonnard	AEI	406	0.70%		
Thierry Peyron		117	0.20%		
Michèle Perez	MoDem dissident	2	0.00%		
Valid votes		58,115	98.56%	58,454	98.18%
Spoilt and null votes		847	1.44%	1,081	1.82%
Votes cast / turnout		58,962	59.48%	59,535	60.07%
Abstentions		40,161	40.52%	39,574	39.93%
Registered voters		99,123	100.00%	99,109	100.00%

=== 2007 ===
Legislative Election 2007: Loire's 4th constituency
Party	Candidate	Votes	%	±%
UMP	Dino Cinieri	16,183	41.06	+15.40
PS	Jean-Paul Chartron	8,007	20.31	N/A
PCF	Marc Faure	5,102	12.94	−19.02
MoDem	Michèle Perez	3,686	9.35	N/A
FN	Robert Heyraud	2,517	6.39	−9.74
LV	Anne de Beaumont	1,237	3.14	N/A
LCR	Laurent Mondon	1,050	2.66	+0.32
Others	N/A	1,633	-	−
Turnout		40,026	57.86	−5.30
2nd round result
UMP	Dino Cinieri	19,903	51.64	+1.35
PS	Jean-Paul Chartron	18,641	48.36	N/A
Turnout		39,725	57.43	−0.12
UMP hold				

=== 2002 ===
Legislative Election 2002: Loire's 4th constituency
Party	Candidate	Votes	%	±%
PCF	Bernard Outin	13,263	31.96	+10.72
UMP	Dino Cinieri	10,649	25.66	N/A
DVD	Jean-François Barnier	6,876	16.57	N/A
FN	Anne-Marie Seyve	6,696	16.13	−8.25
LCR	Laurent Monon	972	2.34	N/A
Others	N/A	3,049	-	−
Turnout		42,319	63.16	−2.60
2nd round result
UMP	Dino Cinieri	18,493	50.29	N/A
PCF	Bernard Outin	18,277	49.71	+7.42
Turnout		38,560	57.55	−13.35
UMP gain from PCF				

=== 1997 ===
Legislative Election 1997: Loire's 4th constituency
Party	Candidate	Votes	%	±%
FD	Daniel Mandon	12,017	28.03	
FN	Frédéric Granjon	10,451	24.38	
PCF	Bernard Outin	9,107	21.24	
PS	Jean-Paul Chartron	7,232	16.87	
LV	Jean-Philippe Bayon	1,939	4.52	
LDI	Richard Raffin	1,269	2.96	
MEI	Driss Torchi	796	1.86	
DVD	Louis Boyer	56	0.13	
Turnout		45,066	65.76	
2nd round result
PCF	Bernard Outin	19,990	42.29	
FD	Daniel Mandon	18,541	39.40	
FN	Frédéric Granjon	8,618	18.31	
Turnout		48,588	70.90	
PCF gain from FD				
