= Dominique Perben =

French politician (born 1945)

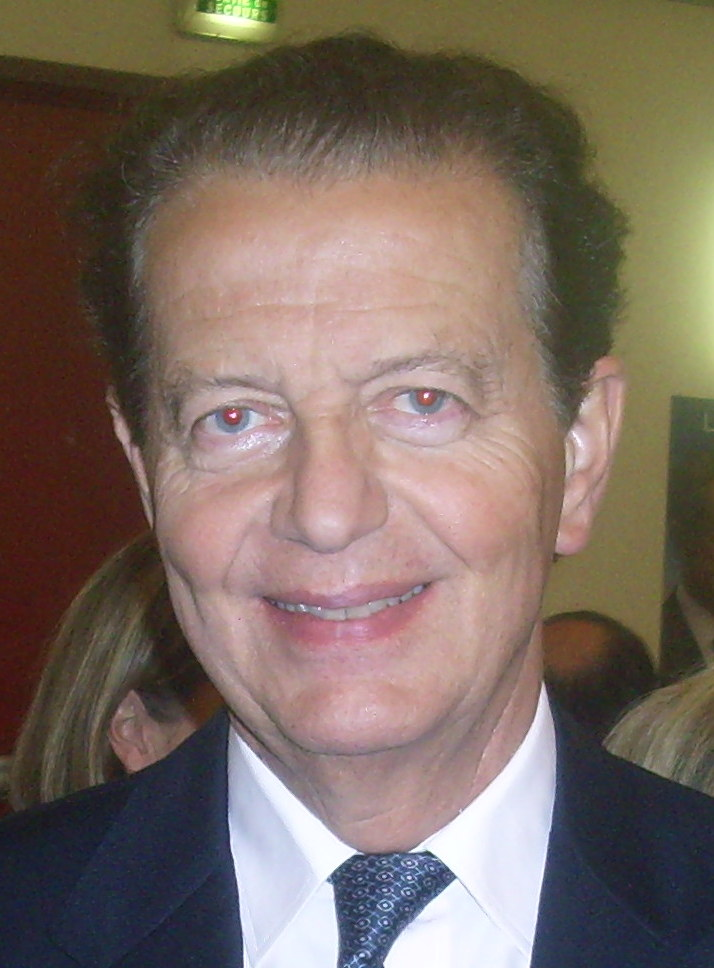

French Minister of Justice
- In office 7 May 2002 – 31 May 2005
- President: Jacques Chirac
- Prime Minister: Jean-Pierre Raffarin
- Preceded by: Marylise Lebranchu
- Succeeded by: Pascal Clément

Personal details
- Born: 11 August 1945 (age 81) Lyon, France
- Party: UMP
- Education: University of Lyon, Sciences-Po Paris, ÉNA

Dominique Perben (French: [dɔminik pɛʁbɛn]; born 11 August 1945) is a French politician. Born in Lyon, he was French Minister of Transportation from 2005 to 2007. He was previously Minister of Justice (2002–05), Minister of Civil Service and Administration (1995–1997) and Minister of Overseas France (1993–1995).

Perben has been a Deputy (or MP) in the National Assembly for the fifth district of Saône-et-Loire from 1986 to 2003. He has been Mayor of Chalon-sur-Saône from 1989 to 2003.

He was a candidate for mayor in Lyon in 2008. Following his defeat against the incumbent socialist mayor Gerard Collomb, he announced in 2010 that he would remove himself from politics and rejoin his previous career as a lawyer.

== Political career ==
Governmental functions

Minister of Departments and Overseas territories : 1993–1995.

Minister of Public Service, Reform of the State and Decentralization : 1995–1997.

Keeper of the Seals, Minister of Justice : 2002–2005.

Minister of Transport, Infrastructure, Tourism and Sea : 2005–2007.

Electoral mandates

National Assembly of France

Member of the National Assembly of France for Rhône (departement) : 2007–2012.

Member of the National Assembly of France for Saône-et-Loire : 1986–1993 (Became minister in 1993) / 1997–2002 (Became minister in 2002). Elected in 1986, reelected in 1988, 1993, 1997, 2002.

Regional Council

Regional councillor of Bourgogne : 1992–1993 (Resignation).

General Council

Vice-president of the General Council of Rhône (departement) : Since 2004.

General councillor of Rhône (departement) : Since 2004.

Vice-president of the General Council of Saône-et-Loire : 1985–1988 (Resignation).

General councillor of Saône-et-Loire : 1985–1988 (Resignation).

Municipal Council

Mayor of Chalon-sur-Saône : 1983–2002 (Resignation).

Deputy-mayor of Chalon-sur-Saône : 2002–2003 (Resignation).

Municipal councillor of Chalon-sur-Saône : 1983–2003 (Resignation).

Political offices
Preceded by Marylise Lebranchu	Minister of Justice; 2002–2005	Succeeded by Pascal Clément
