= Arrondissements of the Loire department =

Administrative divisions of Loire, France

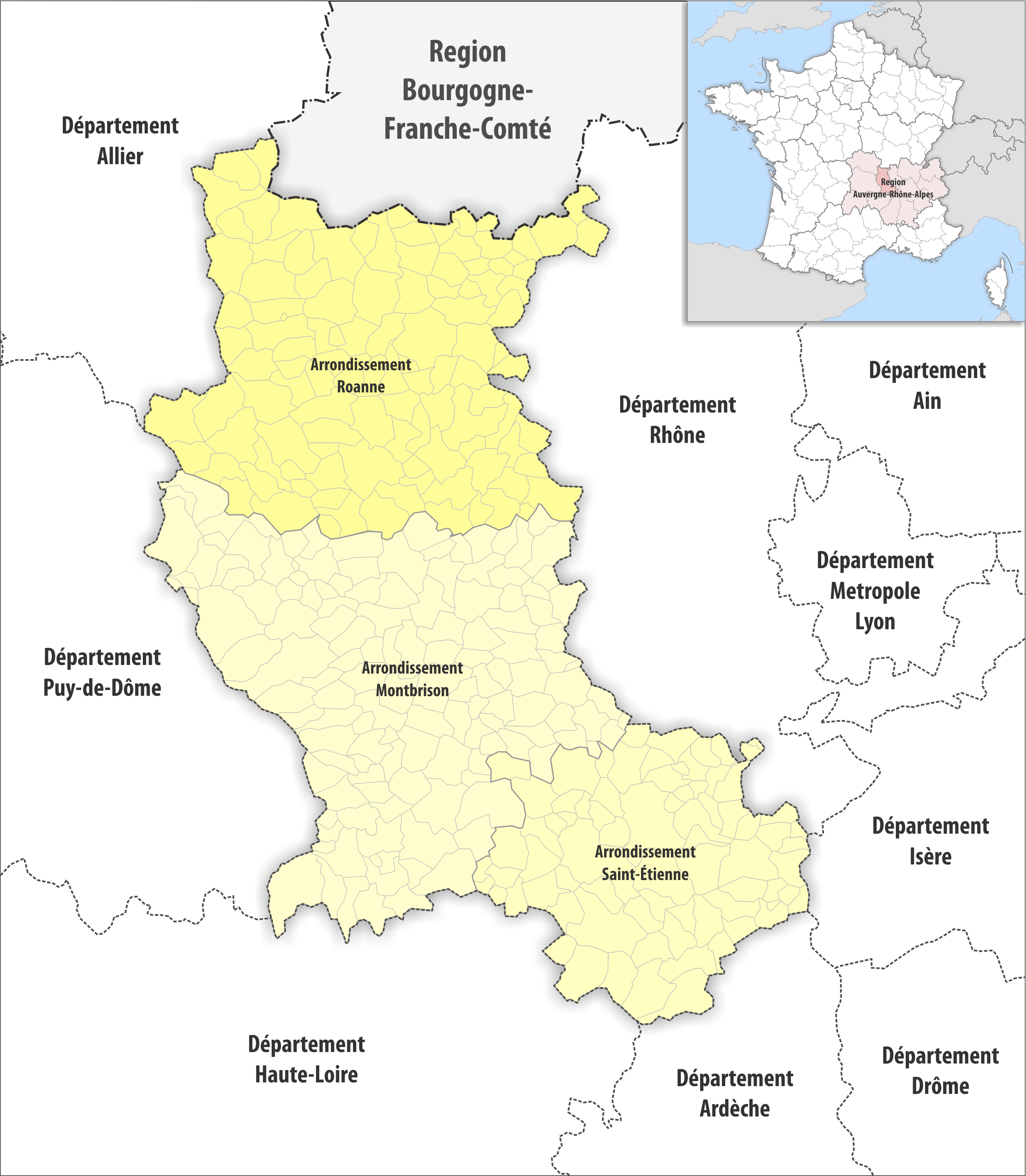
Map of arrondissements of the Loire department.

The 3 arrondissements of the Loire department are:

1. Arrondissement of Montbrison, (subprefecture: Montbrison) with 135 communes. The population of the arrondissement was 185,892 in 2021.
2. Arrondissement of Roanne, (subprefecture: Roanne) with 113 communes. The population of the arrondissement was 157,642 in 2021.
3. Arrondissement of Saint-Étienne, (prefecture of the Loire department: Saint-Étienne) with 75 communes. The population of the arrondissement was 425,495 in 2021.

== History ==
In 1800 the arrondissements of Montbrison, Roanne and Saint-Étienne were established. In January 2017 the commune Andrézieux-Bouthéon passed from the arrondissements of Montbrison to the arrondissement of Saint-Étienne.
