= Pascal Clément =

French politician (1945–2020)

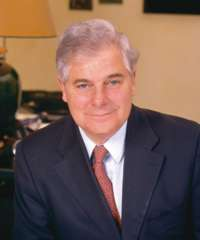
- Pascal Clément in 2004

Minister of Justice
- In office 2 June 2005 – 15 May 2007
- President: Jacques Chirac
- Prime Minister: Dominique de Villepin
- Preceded by: Dominique Perben
- Succeeded by: Rachida Dati

Personal details
- Born: 12 May 1945 Boulogne-Billancourt, France
- Died: 21 June 2020 (aged 75) Paris, France
- Party: UMP
- Education: Sciences Po

Pascal Clément (12 May 1945 – 21 June 2020) was a French politician, member of the UMP. He was a member of the National Assembly of France for the sixth district, encompassing the Loire. He served as Minister of Parliamentary Relations from 1993 to 1995, and Minister of Justice from 2005 to 2007.

== Biography ==
Pascal Clément was born on 12 May 1945 in Boulogne-Billancourt, France.

He was first elected to the National Assembly of France in 1978, where he served until 1993. From March 1993 to May 1995, he served as Minister of Parliamentary Relations. In June 1995, he joined the National Assembly again after Jacques Cyprès stepped down, and he served until 2005. From June 2005 to May 2007, he served as Minister of Justice.

On a more local level, he served as Mayor of Saint-Marcel-de-Félines from 1977 to 2001, and as councillor from 2001 to 2008. He also served as Vice President of the General Council of the Loire from 1982 to 1994, and as its president from 1994 to 2008.

In 2009, he clashed with Nora Berra after he allegedly said "The day there will be as many minarets as cathedrals, this country won't be France any more." Both Berra and Nathalie Kosciusko-Morizet left the room as they found it anti-Muslim, though he later denied he ever said that.

== Death ==
Pascal Clément died due to the lung infection and Pascal's COVID-19 reports were negative according to the family.

== Bibliography ==
- Les Partis politiques minoritaires aux États-Unis (2000) ISBN 978-2-7103-2385-3
- Persigny, L'homme qui a inventé Napoléon III (2006) ISBN 978-2-262-02493-2
- La VIe République ou la Confusion des esprits (2007)

Political offices
Preceded by Dominique Perben	Minister of Justice; 2005–2007	Succeeded by Rachida Dati
