= Régis Juanico =

French politician

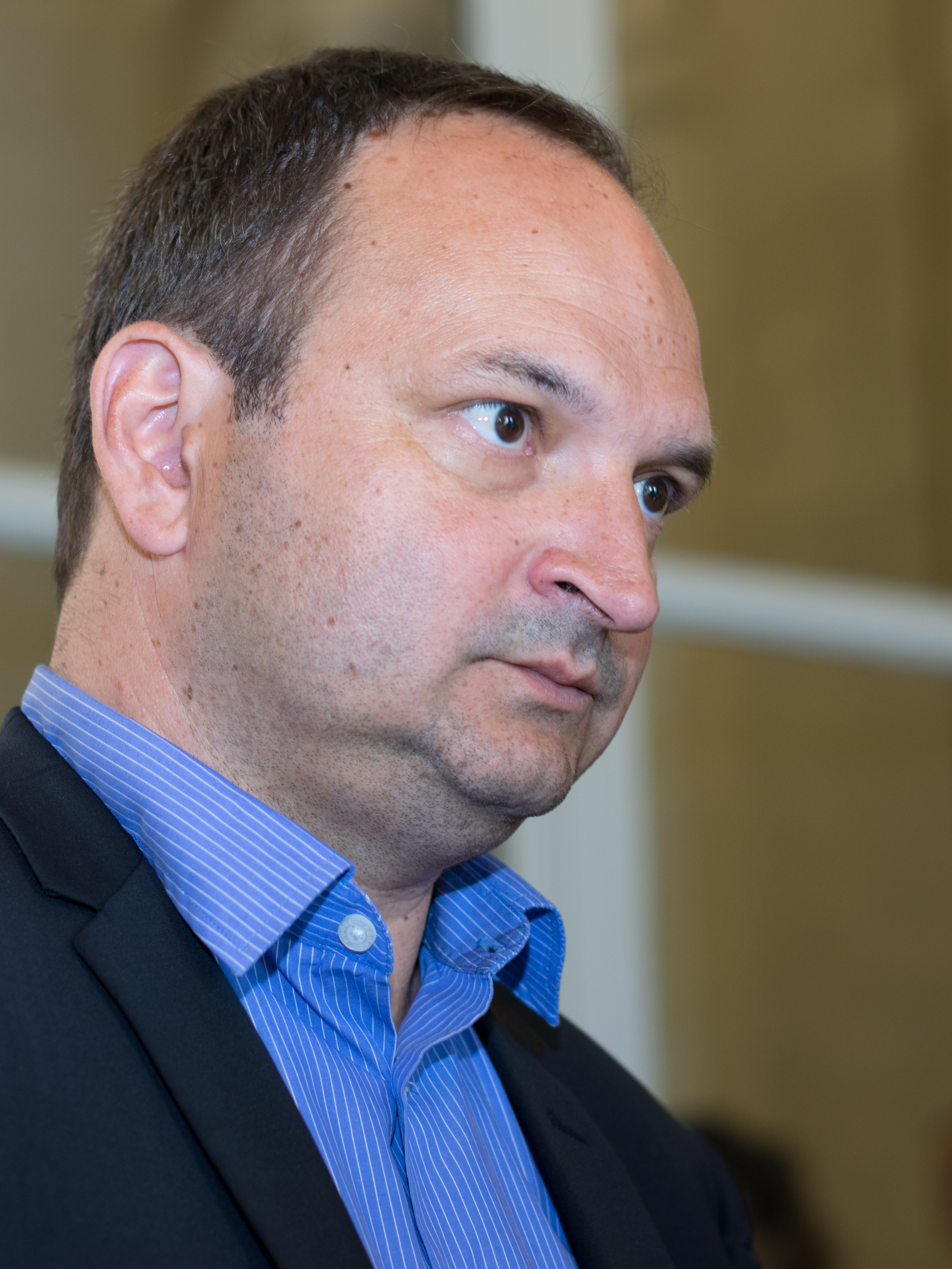

Member of the National Assembly for Loire's 1st constituency
- In office 17 June 2007 – 21 June 2022
- Preceded by: Gilles Artigues
- Succeeded by: Quentin Bataillon

Personal details
- Born: 5 February 1972 (age 54) Saint-Rémy, France
- Party: Génération.s
- Children: Two
- Education: Institut d'études politiques de Lyon; Pantheon-Sorbonne University

Régis Juanico (born 5 February 1972) is a French politician of Génération.s who served as a member of the National Assembly of France from 2007 to 2022, representing Loire's 1st constituency. He is a former member of the Socialist Party.

== Political career ==
Juanico was born in Saint-Rémy, Saône-et-Loire. In parliament, he served on the Committee on European Affairs (2008–2012), the Committee on Cultural Affairs and Education (2009–2012, 2017–2022), the Committee on Social Affairs (2009–2011, 2017–2022) and the Finance Committee (2012–2017).

In addition to his committee assignments, Juanico co-chaired the French-Spanish Parliamentary Friendship Group. He was also the co-president of the Olympic working group in the French National Assembly.

Juanico was regarded a critic of President François Hollande. Ahead of the 2017 presidential election, he supported Benoît Hamon as the party's nominee and served as both spokesperson and treasurer of Hamon's campaign.

Ahead of the 2022 presidential election, Juanico joined the campaign team of Yannick Jadot.
