= Jean-Pierre Taite =

French politician

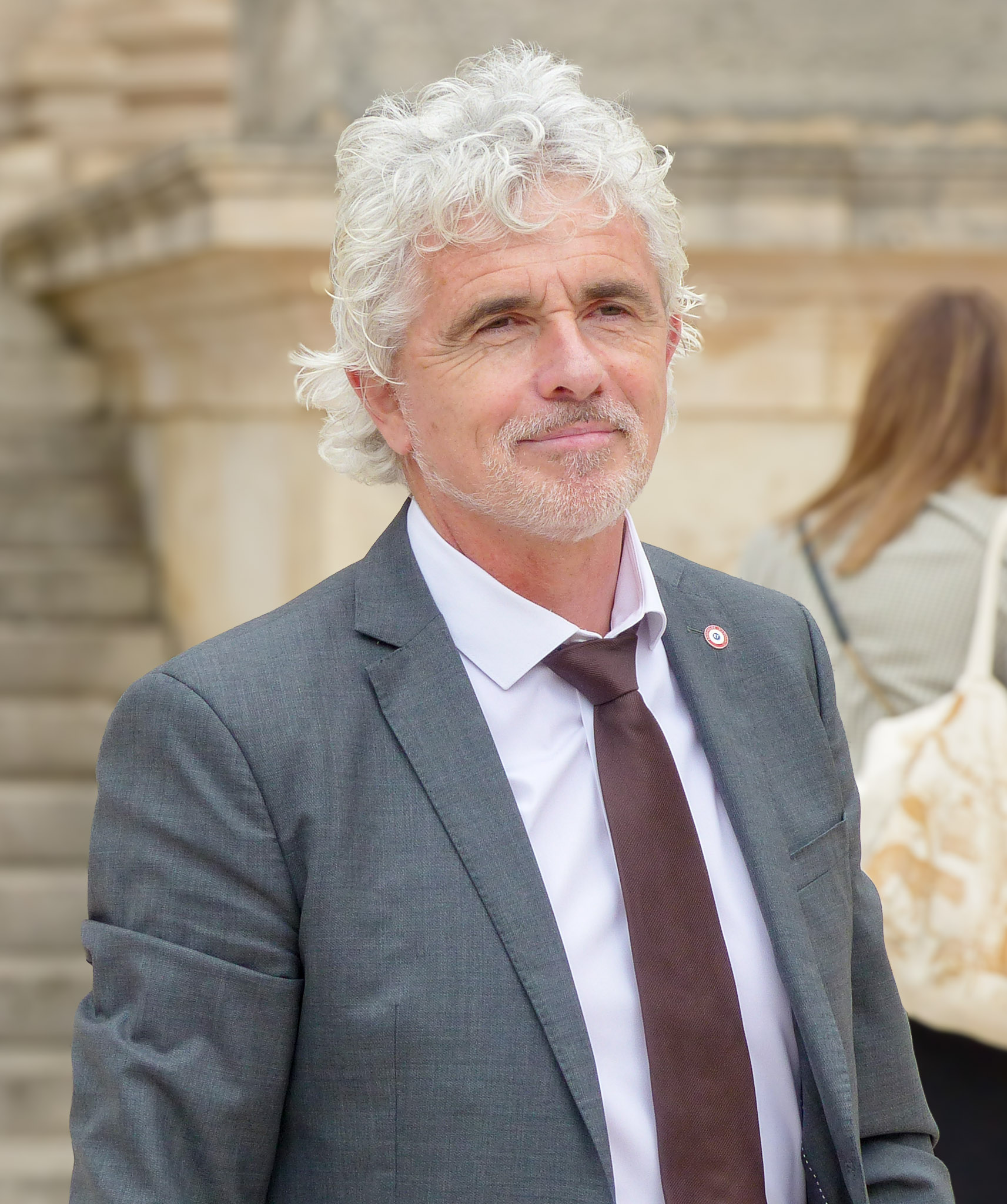

Member of the National Assembly for Loire's 6th constituency
- Incumbent
- Assumed office 22 June 2022
- Preceded by: Julien Borowczyk

Personal details
- Born: 14 March 1962 (age 64) Feurs, Loire France
- Party: Republican
- Other political affiliations: UMP (2008 to 2015)
- Occupation: Photographer

Jean-Pierre Taite (born 14 March 1962) is a French politician.

A member of The Republicans, he was elected Member of Parliament for Loire's 6th constituency in the 2022 French legislative election. He sits within the Republicans group and is a member of the Sustainable Development, Spatial and Regional Planning Committee of the National Assembly.

He has also been regional councillor of Auvergne-Rhône-Alpes since 2016, re-elected in 2021, of which he was deputy vice-president for Agriculture, Viticulture and Local Products from 2017 to 2022.

He was also mayor of his hometown of Feurs from 2008 until his election to the Bourbon Palace in 2022.

== Biography ==
Jean-Pierre Taite is a photographer by profession.

He was elected mayor of the town of Feurs in the Loire in March 2008 and then re-elected in March 2014 and March 2020.

In the 2015 French regional elections he was elected to the Regional Council of Auvergne-Rhône-Alpes and was re-elected in 2021. He is deputy vice-president for agriculture, viticulture and local products from June 2017 to June 2022.

In July 2020, following the municipal and community elections of 2020, he was elected president of the Communauté de communes de Forez-Est.

In the 2022 French legislative election he was elected Member of Parliament for Loire's 6th constituency. Affected by the law limiting the accumulation of mandates, he resigned from his functions as mayor, but remained a municipal councilor until 19 July.

Jean-Pierre Taite is also president of the Les Républicains of Loire federation.

He is in a relationship with the mayor of Le Coteau, Sandra Creuzet who is a legal representative in a hospital structure.
