= Sylvie Bonnet =

French politician (born 1969)

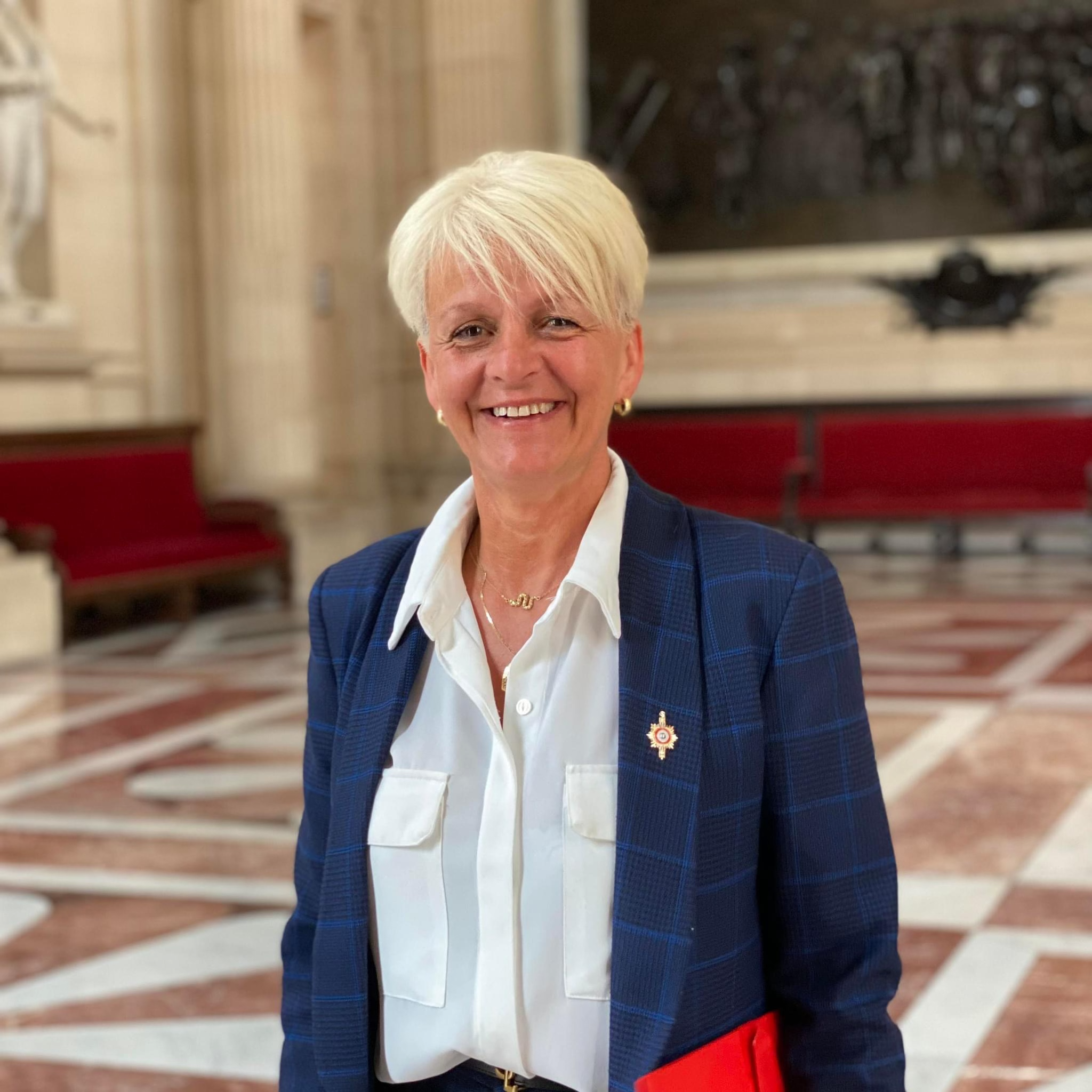
- Sylvie Bonnet in 2024

Member of the National Assembly for Loire's 4th constituency
- Incumbent
- Assumed office 8 July 2024
- Preceded by: Dino Cinieri

Personal details
- Born: 21 December 1969 (age 56) Saint-Just-Saint-Rambert, France
- Party: Republican
- Website: www.bonnetsylvie.fr

Sylvie Bonnet (born 21 December 1969) is a French politician. A member of The Republicans (LR), she has been a member of parliament for Loire's 4th constituency in the National Assembly since 2024.

== See also ==
- List of deputies of the 17th National Assembly of France
