= Loire (department) =

Department in Auvergne-Rhône-Alpes, France

Loire Lêre (Arpitan) Léger (Occitan)
- Department of France
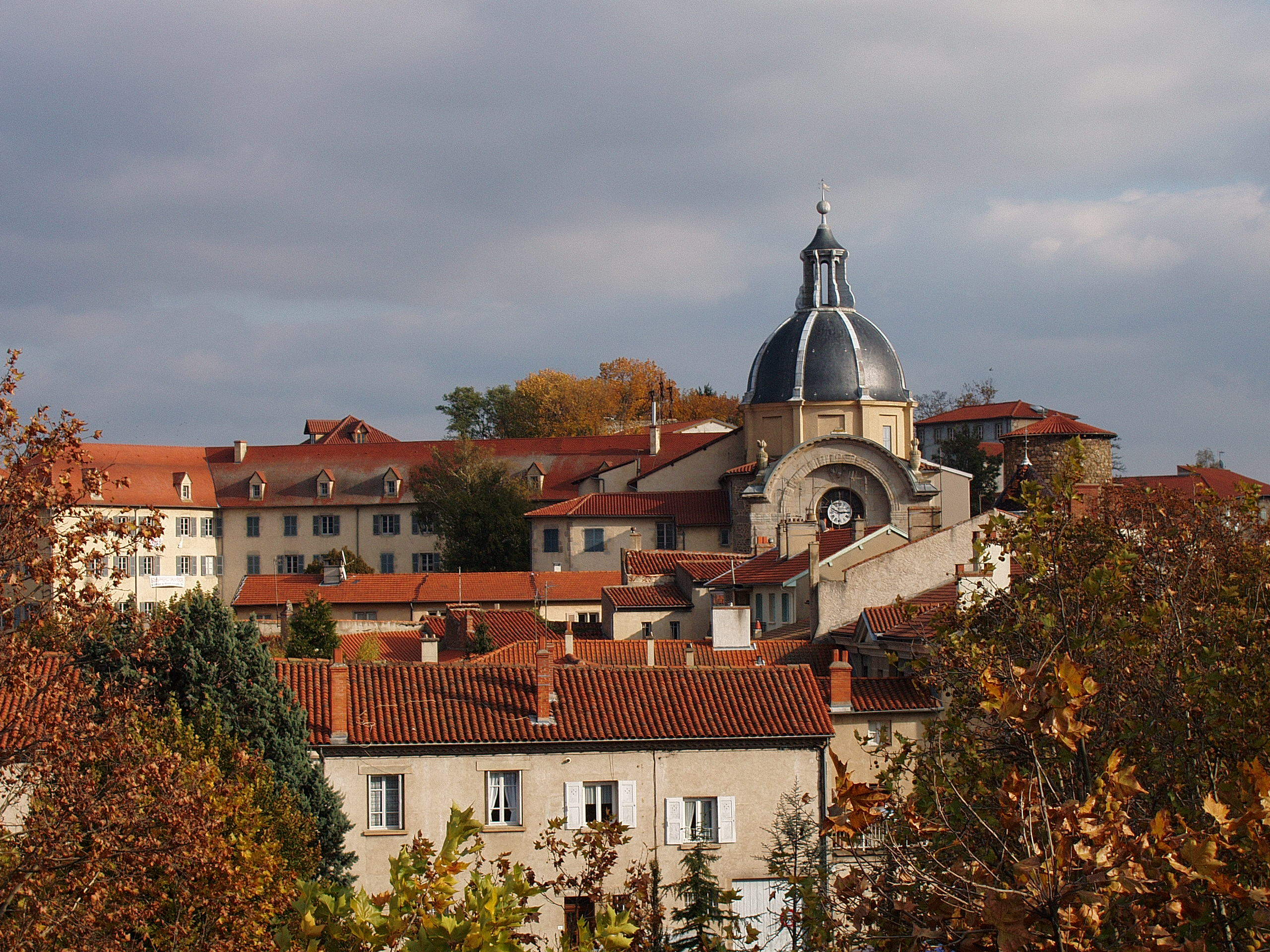
- Montbrison in 2007

- Flag Coat of arms

- Location of Loire in France
- Coordinates: 45°05′N 04°05′E
- Country: France
- Region: Auvergne-Rhône-Alpes
- Prefecture: Saint-Étienne
- Subprefectures: Montbrison; Roanne

Government
  - President of the Departmental Council: Georges Ziegler (LR)

Area^{1}
  - Total: 4,781 km^{2} (1,846 sq mi)

Population (2023)
  - Total: 774,133
  - Rank: 30th
  - Density: 161.9/km^{2} (419.4/sq mi)
- Demonym: Ligerian (Ligérien)
- Time zone: UTC+1 (CET)
  - Summer (DST): UTC+2 (CEST)
- Department number: 42
- Arrondissements: 3
- Cantons: 21
- Communes: 320
- ^1 French Land Register data, which exclude estuaries and lakes, ponds and glaciers larger than 1 km^{2}

Loire (/lwɑːr/; French pronunciation: [lwaʁ]; Arpitan: Lêre; Occitan: Léger or Leir) is a landlocked department in the Auvergne-Rhône-Alpes region of France occupying the river Loire's upper reaches. Its prefecture is Saint-Étienne. It had a population of 774,133 in 2023.

== History ==
Loire was created in 1793 when the Rhône-et-Loire département was split into two, about three years after it was created in 1790. This was a response to counter-revolutionary activities in Lyon which, by population, was the country's second largest city. By splitting Rhône-et-Loire the government sought to protect the French Revolution from the potential power and influence of counter revolutionary activity in the Lyon region.

The Loire département roughly corresponds to the former province of Forez.

The departmental capitals (prefectures) throughout its history are as follows:

- Feurs 1793–1795
- Montbrison 1795–1855
- Saint-Étienne since 1855

== Geography ==
Loire is part of the current administrative region of Auvergne-Rhône-Alpes and is surrounded by the départements of Rhône, Isère, Ardèche, Haute-Loire, Puy-de-Dôme, Allier, and Saône-et-Loire.

The river Loire traverses the department from south to north.

The Loire département is divided into three arrondissements:

- Arrondissement of Montbrison
- Arrondissement of Roanne
- Arrondissement of Saint-Étienne

Parts of the department belong to Parc naturel régional Livradois-Forez.

== Demographics ==
The inhabitants of the département are called Ligériens in French. The industrial city of Saint-Étienne with its agglomeration contains about half of the inhabitants of the département.

Population development since 1801:

Historical population

Year	Pop.	±% p.a.
1801	290,903	—
1806	317,053	+1.74%
1821	343,454	+0.53%
1831	391,216	+1.31%
1841	434,085	+1.05%
1851	472,588	+0.85%
1861	517,603	+0.91%
1872	550,611	+0.56%
1881	599,836	+0.96%
1891	616,227	+0.27%
1901	647,633	+0.50%
1911	640,549	−0.11%
1921	637,130	−0.05%
1931	664,822	+0.43%

Year	Pop.	±% p.a.
1936	650,226	−0.44%
1946	631,591	−0.29%
1954	654,482	+0.45%
1962	696,348	+0.78%
1968	722,443	+0.62%
1975	742,396	+0.39%
1982	739,521	−0.06%
1990	746,288	+0.11%
1999	728,524	−0.27%
2007	740,668	+0.21%
2012	753,763	+0.35%
2017	762,941	+0.24%
2023	774,133	+0.24%

=== Principal towns ===
The most populous commune is Saint-Étienne, the prefecture. As of 2023, there are 7 communes with more than 15,000 inhabitants:

Commune	Population (2023)
Saint-Étienne	173,136
Saint-Chamond	35,646
Roanne	35,409
Firminy	17,060
Montbrison	16,123
Saint-Just-Saint-Rambert	15,764
Rive-de-Gier	15,242

== Politics ==
The president of the Departmental Council is Georges Ziegler, elected in October 2017.

=== Current National Assembly Representatives ===
Constituency	Member	Party
Loire's 1st constituency	Pierrick Courbon	PS
Loire's 2nd constituency	Andrée Taurinya	LFI
Loire's 3rd constituency	Emmanuel Mandon	MoDem
Loire's 4th constituency	Sylvie Bonnet	LR
Loire's 5th constituency	Antoine Vermorel-Marques	LR
Loire's 6th constituency	Jean-Pierre Taite	LR

== Tourism ==
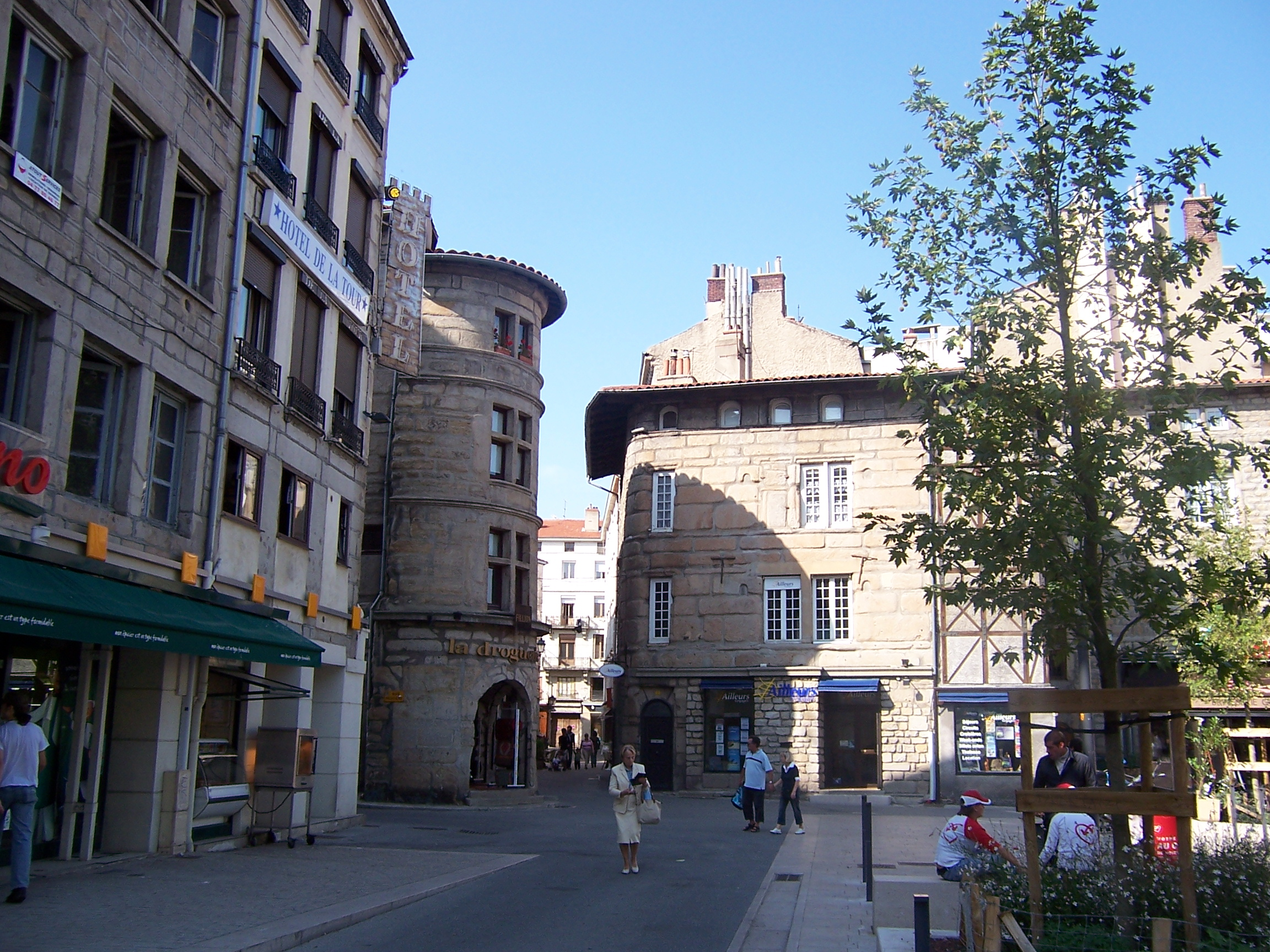
Saint-Étienne

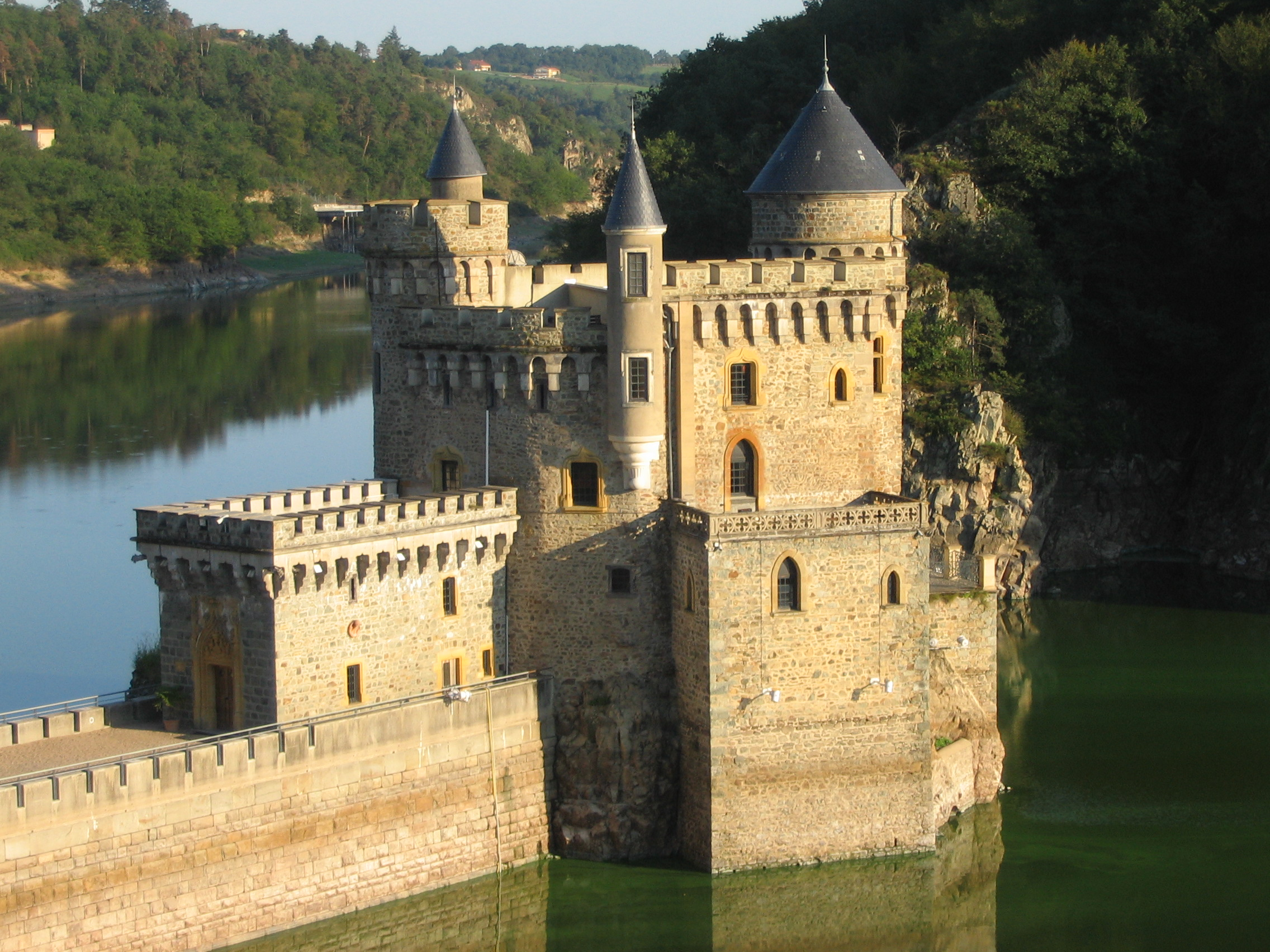
Château de La Roche

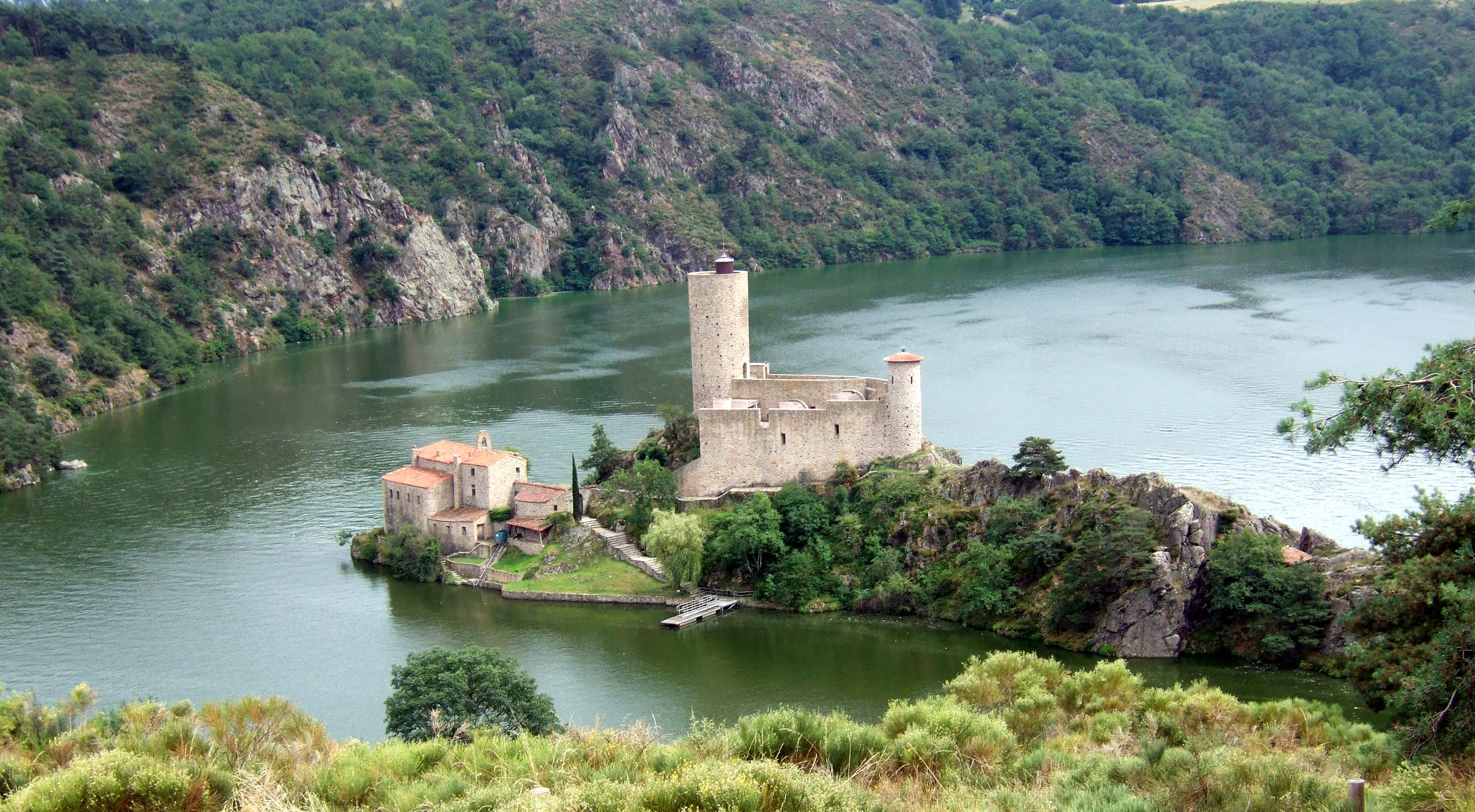
Château de Grangent

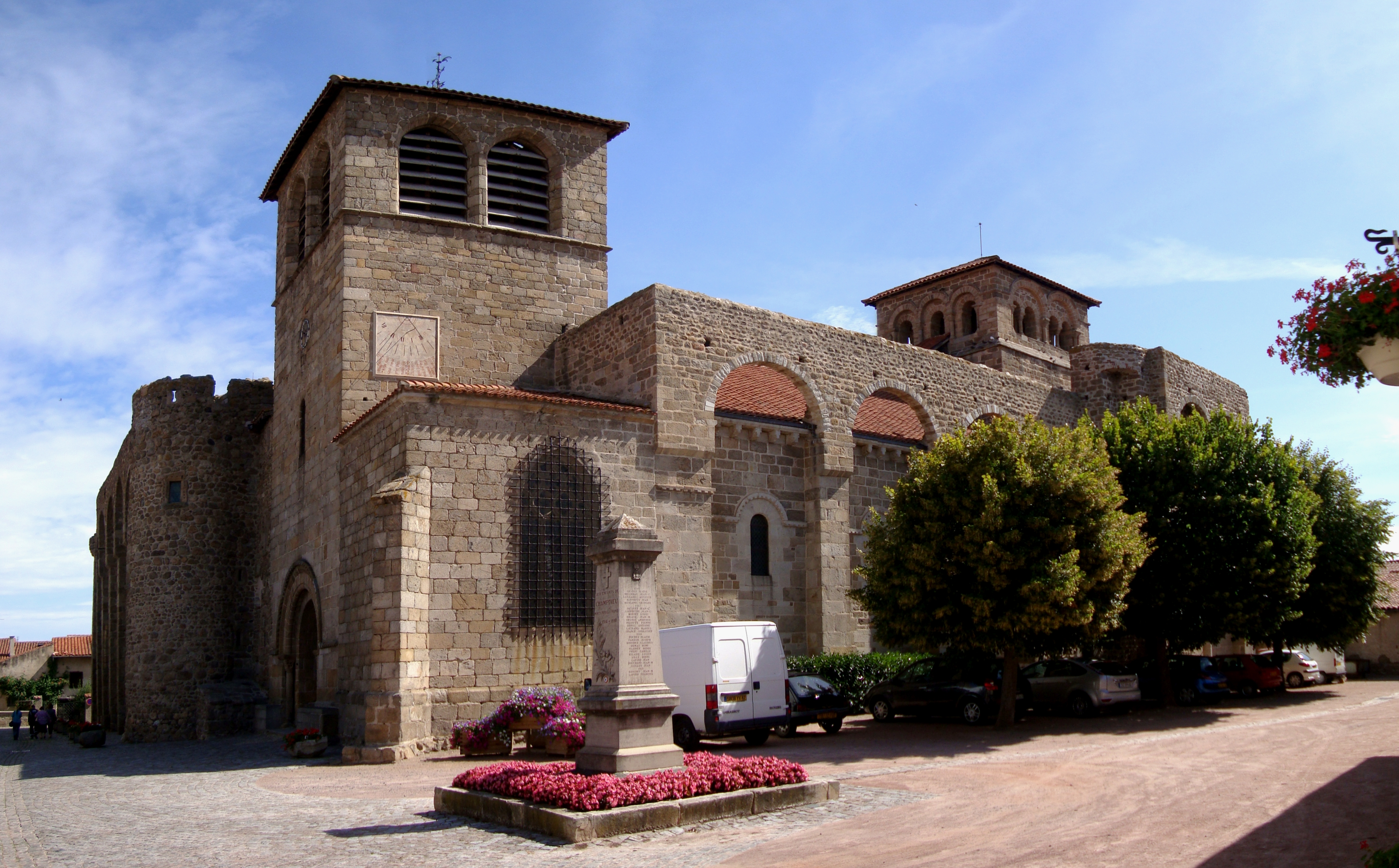
Champdieu

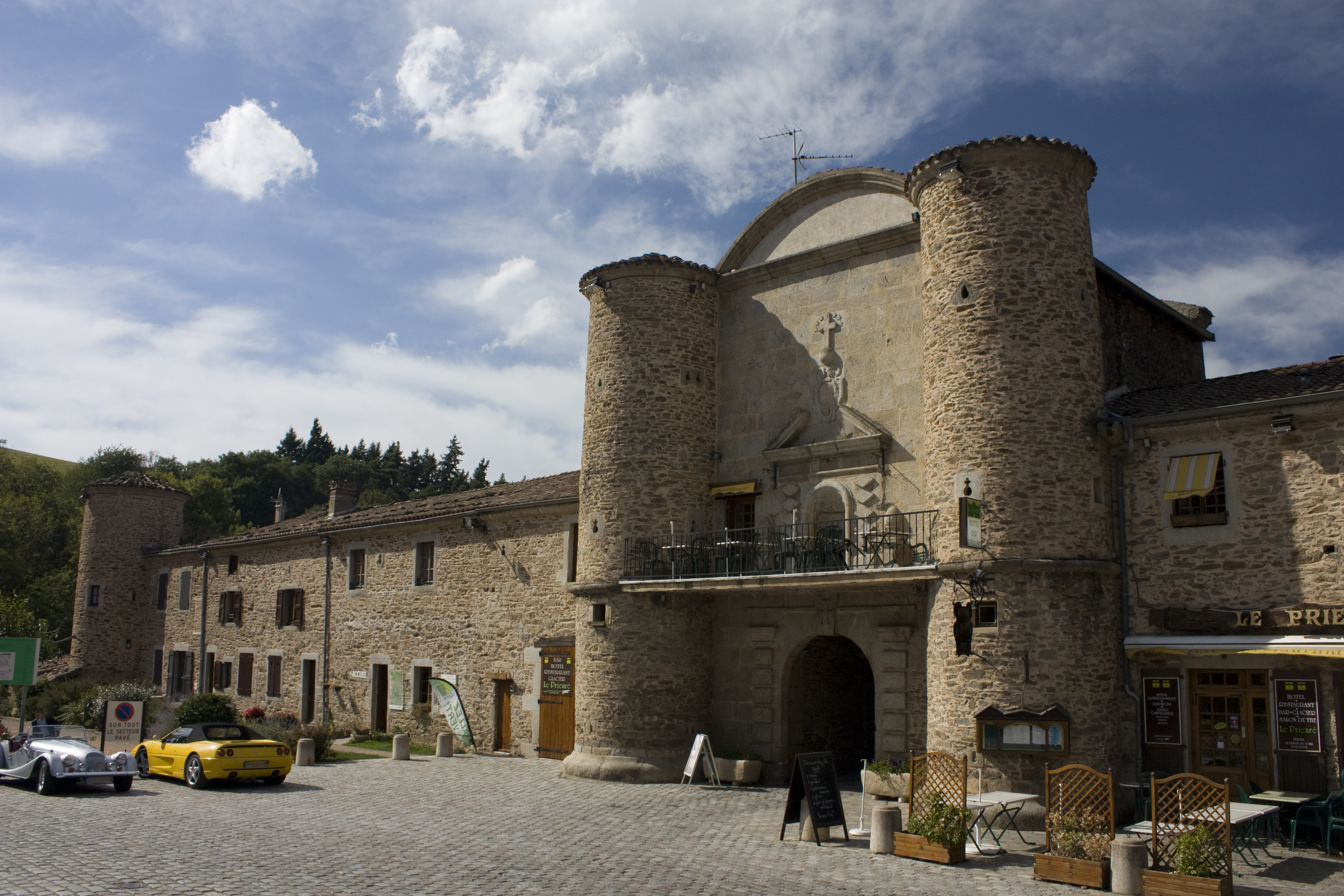
Sainte-Croix-en-Jarez, one of The Most Beautiful Villages of France

== See also ==
- Auvergne-Rhône-Alpes
- Cantons of the Loire department
- Communes of the Loire department
- Arrondissements of the Loire department
- Loire coal mining basin
- Loire General Council
