= Quentin Bataillon =

French politician (born 1993)

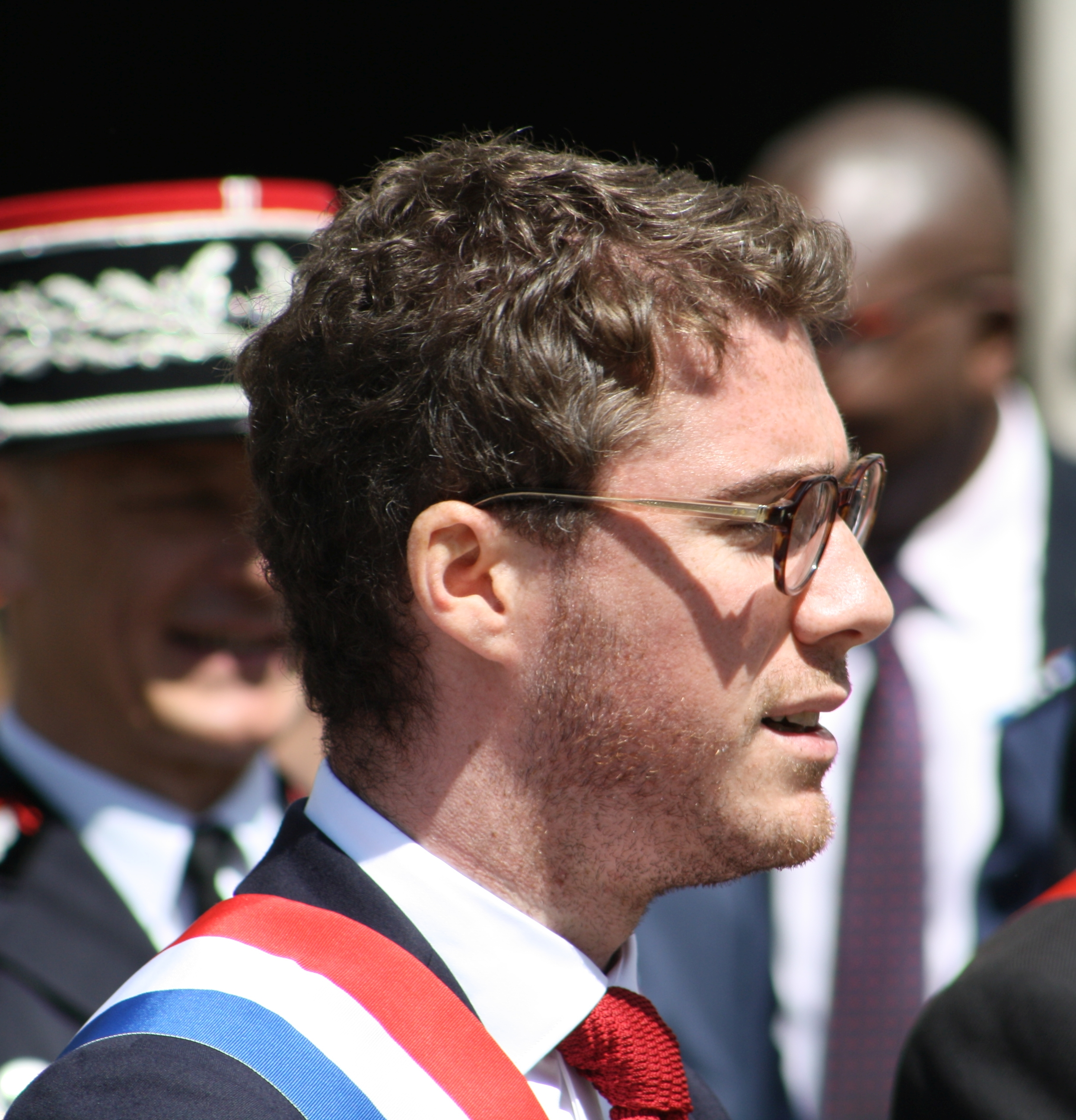

Member of the National Assembly for Loire's 1st constituency
- Incumbent
- Assumed office 22 June 2022
- Preceded by: Régis Juanico

Personal details
- Born: 9 September 1993 (age 32) Feurs, Loire, France
- Party: La République En Marche!
- Other political affiliations: Agir (2020 to 2022)

Quentin Bataillon (born 9 September 1993) is a French politician from La République En Marche! and a member of the National Assembly for Loire's 1st constituency.
