= Le Touquet =

Beach community in northeast France

Le Touquet-Paris-Plage
- Commune
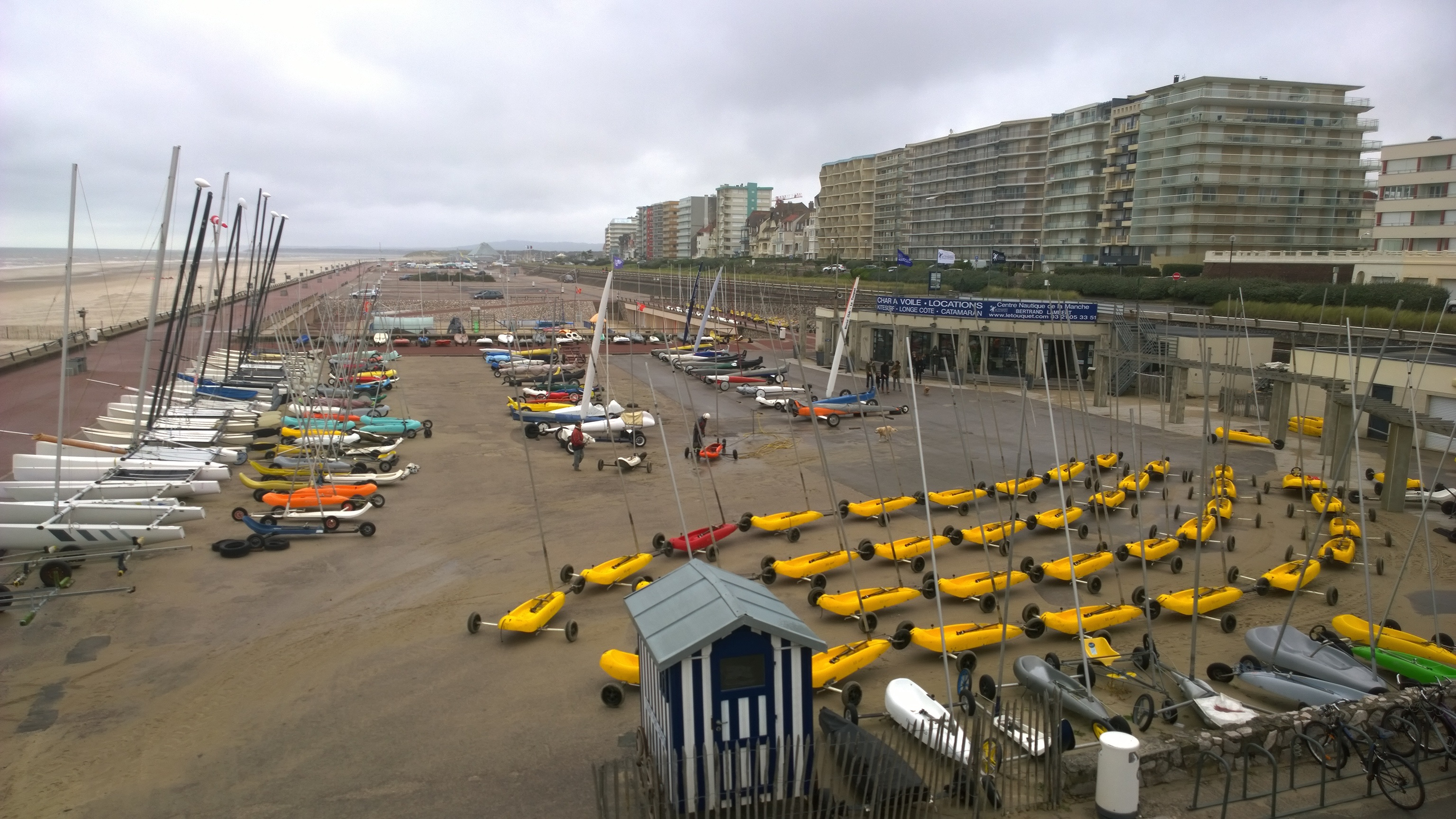
- Beach of Le Touquet

- Coat of arms
- Location of Le Touquet-Paris-Plage
- Location within France Location within Hauts-de-France
- Coordinates: 50°31′07″N 1°35′42″E
- Country: France
- Region: Hauts-de-France
- Department: Pas-de-Calais
- Arrondissement: Montreuil
- Canton: Étaples
- Intercommunality: CA Deux Baies en Montreuillois

Government
  - Mayor (2020–2026): Daniel Fasquelle (LR)
- Area^{1}: 15.31 km^{2} (5.91 sq mi)
- Elevation: 5 m (16 ft)
- Highest elevation: 42 m (138 ft)
- Lowest elevation: 0 m (0 ft)
- Population (2023): 4,224
  - Density: 275.9/km^{2} (714.6/sq mi)
- Demonym(s): Touquettois (masculine); Touquettoise (feminine)
- Time zone: UTC+01:00 (CET)
  - Summer (DST): UTC+02:00 (CEST)
- INSEE/Postal code: 62826 /62520
- Website: lestouquettois.fr (administrative), letouquet.com (tourism-related)
- ^{1} French Land Register data, which excludes lakes, ponds, glaciers > 1 km^{2} (0.386 sq mi or 247 acres) and river estuaries.

Le Touquet-Paris-Plage (French pronunciation: [lə tukɛ paʁi plaʒ]; Picard: Ech Toutchet-Paris-Plache), commonly referred to as Le Touquet (/lə tʊkeɪ/), is a commune near Étaples, in the Pas-de-Calais department, northern France. It has a permanent population of 4,224 (2023) but it welcomes up to 250,000 people during the summer, so the population at any given time during high season in summer swells to about 30,000. Located on the Opal Coast of the English Channel at the estuary of the river Canche, the commune is one of the most renowned seaside resorts in France, with a wide range of sports and leisure activities.

The name "Le Touquet" is attested in the mid-18th century to designate the cape next to which the town was built. Alphonse Daloz, a notary in Paris, bought the land on the cape, planted a forest and built a small palace there, and in 1882 founded the seaside resort as Paris-Plage. John Whitley, an English businessman, saw a lucrative opportunity to build a resort for (mostly) English and French elites, so he became the owner of most of the town's lands. The construction boom that followed his acquisition led to the government recognising Paris-Plage as a separate commune in 1912. Numerous prestigious hotels were built, and at its peak of prosperity in the Roaring Twenties, the resort boasted the biggest casino in France by revenue, ultra-luxury hotels and an upscale clientele. The bustling town had good transport connections thanks to a tram line and a narrow-gauge train line to Étaples, and, since 1936, a dedicated airport. The Great Depression brought some problems to the resort but it still remained popular with the British upper class. World War II, however, brought extensive destruction as the Germans deployed about 100,000 mines and the Allies bombarded the resort in 1944. After World War II, most of the upper class chose vacations on the French Riviera instead, and the property they sold was bought up by well-off locals.

While most of the original buildings were lost due to destruction during World War II, some surviving villas represent the unique architectural style that was popular in the interwar period. 21 buildings in the commune are protected as historical monuments. Le Touquet also has extensive natural heritage protection because of its dunes and the unique nature of the Canche estuary. This, together with its initial inception as an upper-class resort with extensive sports facilities, which it still mostly is, contributes to consistently high positions in quality-of-life rankings. Today, most of its permanent population is retired. President Emmanuel Macron often spends time in Le Touquet and votes there because Brigitte, his wife, has strong ties to the town and inherited a villa in 1985.

== Etymology ==
=== Touquet ===
There are two theories as to the meaning of the word Touquet. The more prevalent explanation goes that the name derives from the Old French touquet, meaning "bend" or "corner". Édouard Lévêque writes that in the Middle Ages, if a house was located around the corner, people would say it was located al touquet del rue, or, in modern French, au tournant de la rue. This logic was applied to this area because what is now the easternmost part of Le Touquet and the village of Trépied was where the land ended. The shore was in a form of a cape ("corner"), limited by the river Canche to the north and the English Channel to the west. This interpretation found support in Karel de Flou's works analysing the names of the northern French coast. In fact, the Dutch name for Le Touquet is Het Hoekske, 'Little Corner'. A 1982 publication about Le Touquet by a local historical society also agreed with this finding. The academy added it could be that the cape's name came from the fact that it is located on the edge of Picardy.

An alternative theory posits that Touquet is related to the words "forest" and "wood". Historian Auguste Longnon suggests that placenames like Le Touchet may have a link to Le Touquet. If that is true, Le Touquet's name derives from a word meaning "ornamental wood". Linguists Albert Dauzat and Charles Rostaing also suggested this hypothesis might be true. Their proposed evolution of the toponym starts from La Touche (Tochia in 13th century) and Les Touches (Tuschiae in 14th century). Two steps then happened: first, an -ittum suffix was added, which gradually became -et; after that, the [ʃ] sound changed to a [k] sound, a common transition in Normandy and Picardy. In their opinion, the word ultimately derives from a pre-Latin form meaning "grove" or "wood reserve".

Mentions of the word Touquet in the area were already appearing by mid-18th century. A map by cartographer César-François Cassini de Thury recognises the area as Pointe du Touquet, 'Cape Le Touquet'. A 1764 map by another cartographer, Jacques-Nicholas Bellin, indicated that the name for the shoals of the river Canche was Banc du Touquet, 'Le Touquet sandbank'. Ten years later, a hamlet of neighbouring Cucq was identified as Toucquet les Mauvaises Femmes (lit. 'Toucquet Bad Women').

=== Paris-Plage ===
While the origins of the name "Touquet" are obscure, the "Paris-Plage" part is easily traceable. In April 1882, Alphonse Daloz created the first subdivision within the cape's area and called it Paris-Plage, following advice of the late Hippolyte de Villemessant, editor-in-chief of Le Figaro. In 1874, Villemessant had written a letter that commended the qualities of the then-empty beach of Touquet. He described it as "more beautiful than that of Trouville" and that he wanted to make it an "Arcachon of the North". Both cities are renowned seaside resorts. Le Touquet, in his view, would resolve the "Paris-on-Sea (Paris-Plage) problem" for the people living in Paris – in other words, that it would become the destination of choice for Parisians looking for a beach resort. The French government first acknowledged the name in 1892 in an order of the Prime Minister, Émile Loubet and the minister of the interior. The law of 28 March 1912, which separated Paris-Plage from Cucq into a separate commune, further recognised its existence under the current compound name.

This part of the name was the subject of a trademark dispute with Paris. The French capital decided to launch Paris-Plages (then Paris-Plage), an artificial beaches programme on the Seine. Paris submitted an application to reserve the name for its event. Le Touquet objected and replied with its own trademark submission the following year, which led to a lawsuit from the capital city that asserted right of priority for its own submission. In January 2008, Paris settled with Le Touquet, allowing the latter to retain its second part of the name unchanged.

== History ==
The modern history of the Le Touquet started with Alphonse Daloz, a notary from Paris, and his partners buying land on the Cape of Le Touquet. They tried without success to convert the rather unproductive warrens for agricultural use, and after they failed, Daloz bought all the land from his other partners and decided to plant a forest and build a manor on his estate. The notary founded the village of Le Touquet-Paris-Plage in April 1882, at first known as Paris-Plage. The subdivision grew so quickly that it drew the attention of John Robinson Whitley, an English entrepreneur who saw a business opportunity in creating an ultra-luxury 'meeting place' between wealthy Englishmen and Frenchmen with an emphasis on sports and generally "health through pleasure". Mayville, as he called the initial project, never materialised, but Whitley, together with his partner Allen Stoneham, persisted and finally bought out most lands from the Daloz's manor at an auction in 1902.

The English investment continued the construction boom in the town even if the initial vision of Mayville was scaled down. Le Touquet gained a reputation of a posh resort due to, among other things, several luxury hotels and an abundance of sports activities associated with the upper class, particularly those catering to the tastes of British guests. In fact, the town's first golf course was inaugurated by Lord Balfour, Prime Minister of the United Kingdom. The peak of Le Touquet's prosperity came during the Roaring Twenties, as British elites dominated the life of the resort. The town had the largest casino by revenue in France just before the Great Depression. The crisis stopped the explosive growth of Le Touquet but the town came relatively unscathed because the aristocrats from the other side of the English Channel continued to come to Le Touquet as before. Many buildings built in the 1920s and 1930s were a testament of the city's riches.

Brief history of Le Touquet in images

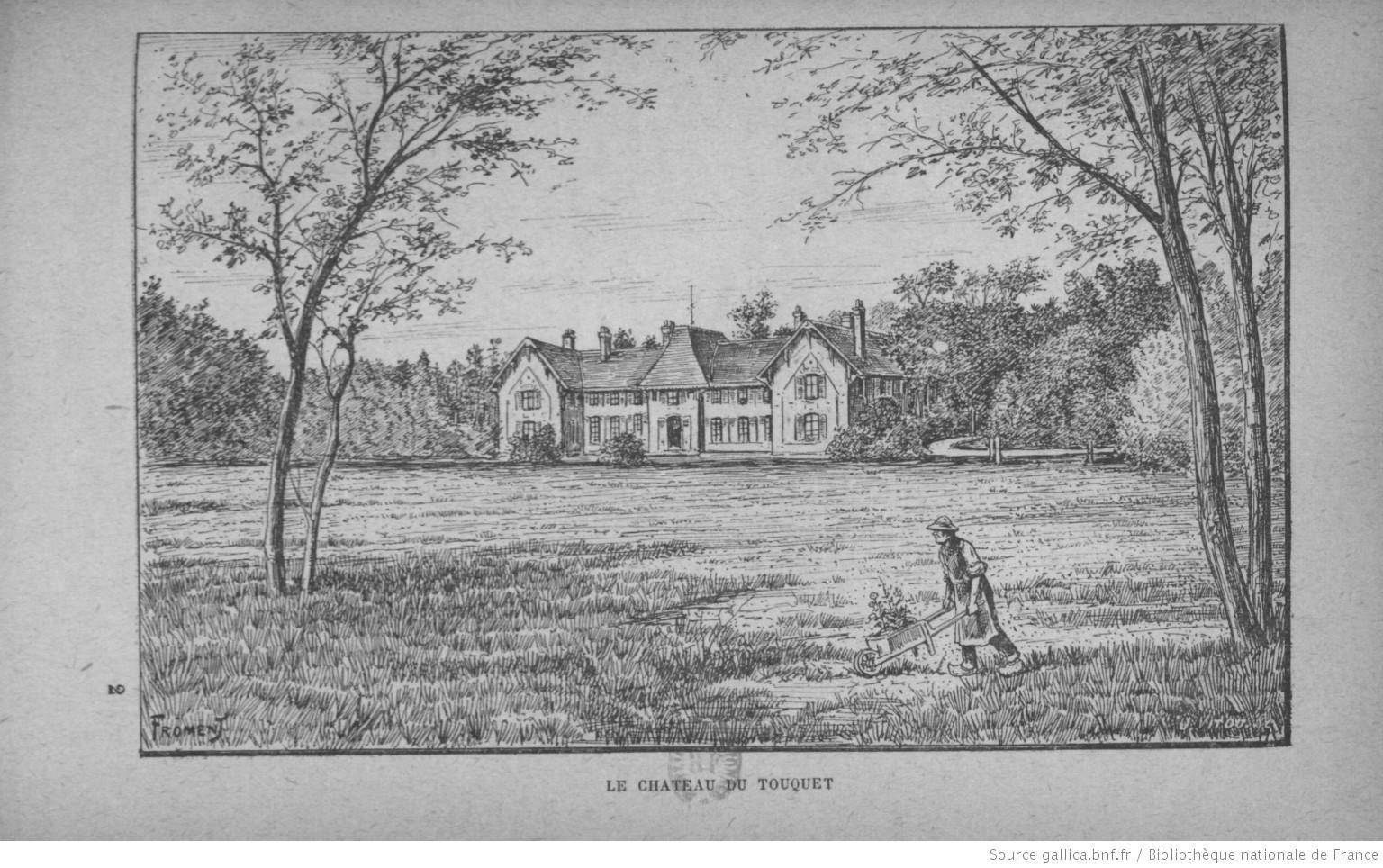
Daloz's palace (1864), near what is today Place de l'Hermitage

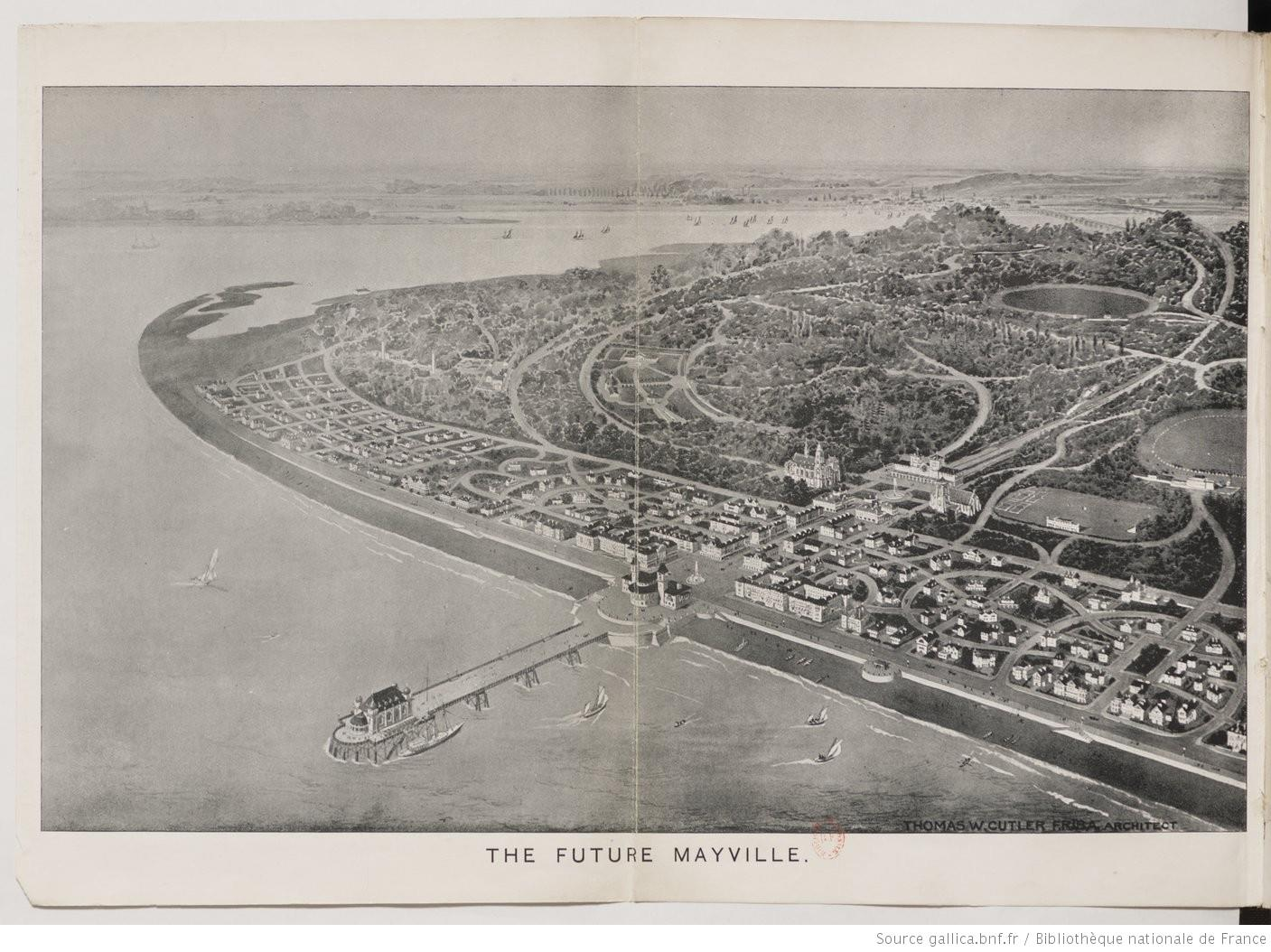
Photo simulation of Mayville project (1895)

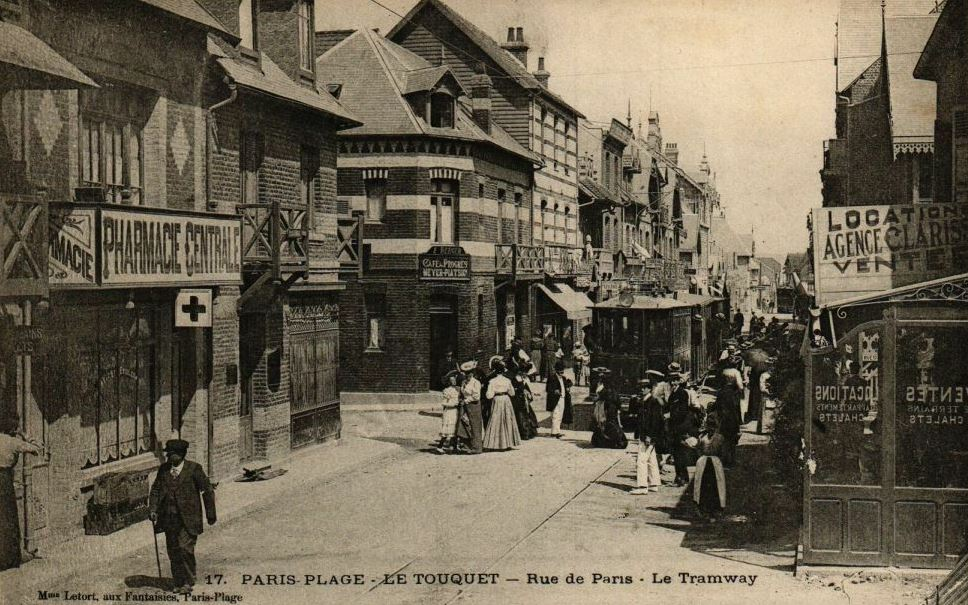
Pre-World War II postcard of Rue de Paris, the main street of Le Touquet. Note the tram

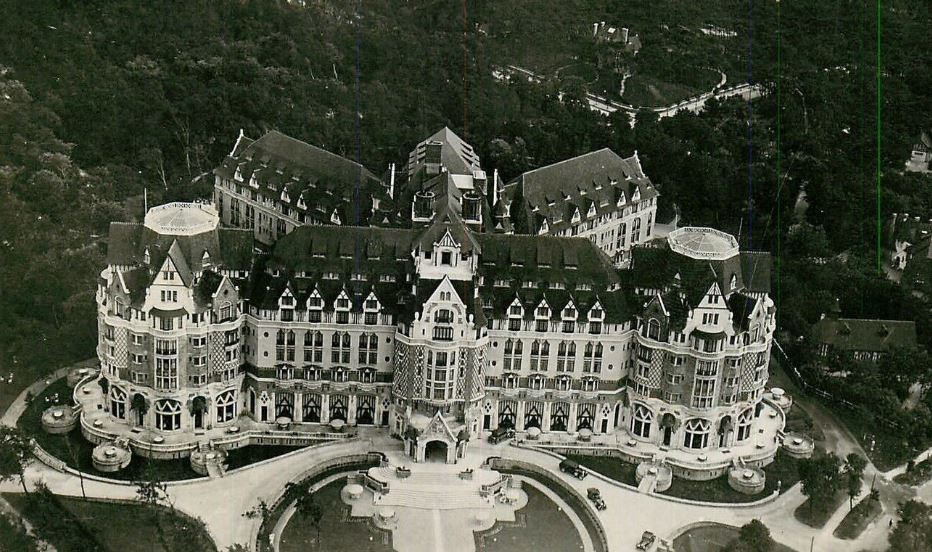
A bird's-eye view on Hotel Royal Picardy (1929); according to one contemporary review, it was "the biggest, most luxurious hotel in the world"

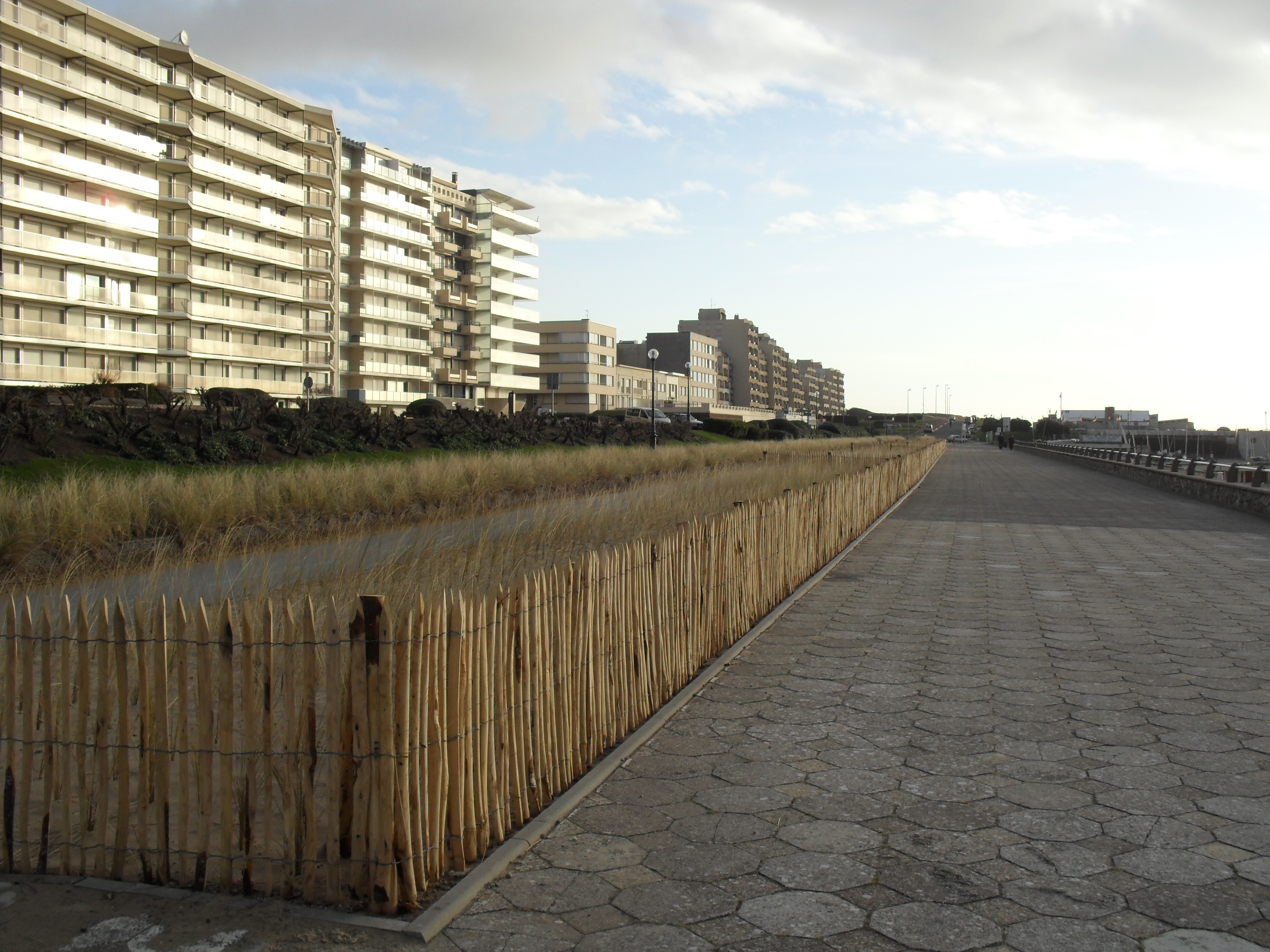
Post-World War II seaside high-rise apartment buildings

Wars interrupted the development of Le Touquet. During World War I, the Allied military commandeered large hotels and converted them to makeshift hospitals to treat the wounded coming from the trenches of the Western Front. Enlisted soldiers, particularly those stationed at the nearby garrison in Étaples, were banned from the town to let officers use its facilities for themselves. The town hosted 6,000 Belgian refugees and the municipal administration of the frontline city of Ypres. Military presence was reintroduced in 1939 as World War II took off. Germans captured Le Touquet during the invasion of France in 1940, where they created a local headquarters for the Wehrmacht, the National Socialist Motor Corps and the Organisation Todt. Due to its position on the coast facing Britain, Germans ordered the construction of the Atlantic Wall, which led to the town being heavily fortified and mined. Le Touquet was liberated in September 1944, but it suffered extensive damage.

The town lost much of its traits associated with the British elites as the British sold their possessions to well-off locals and as the government of France decided to prioritise the development of the warmer French Riviera, by that time another popular destination with the high society. Since the 1970s, the town pursued a new strategy formulated by mayor Léonce Deprez, who wanted to make Le Touquet a "year-round resort", so new developments included an indoor thalassotherapy institute, the enduro race called Enduropale and a flea market of antique items. His efforts were helped by improved rail and car connections to the town. The commune also launched massive acquisitions of sports- and culture-related properties. Le Touquet increasingly became populated by pensioners, which, as of 2014, constitute more than half of its permanent residents.

== Geography ==
Le Touquet is squeezed between the left (south-western) bank of the estuary of the Canche river and the English Channel coast, in the western part of the Pas-de-Calais department in the north of France. It is in a coastal region that is frequently referred to as the Côte d'Opale (Opal Coast), a name that evokes the iridescent reflections of the setting sun on the sea. Le Touquet is also located in the northern part of a natural region called Marquenterre. On the other side of the Canche estuary is Étaples, a local transport hub and the nearest railway station. The other neighbour of Le Touquet is the commune of Cucq, to which the town belonged before 1912. That commune includes another resort called Stella-Plage, directly south of Le Touquet. Significant towns in the vicinity include Boulogne-sur-Mer (32 km (20 mi) to the north) and Calais (70 km (43 mi) in the same direction). Among larger cities, Lille is 140 km (87 mi) to the east and Paris, in part the commune's namesake, is 240 km (150 mi) to the south.

=== Landscape ===
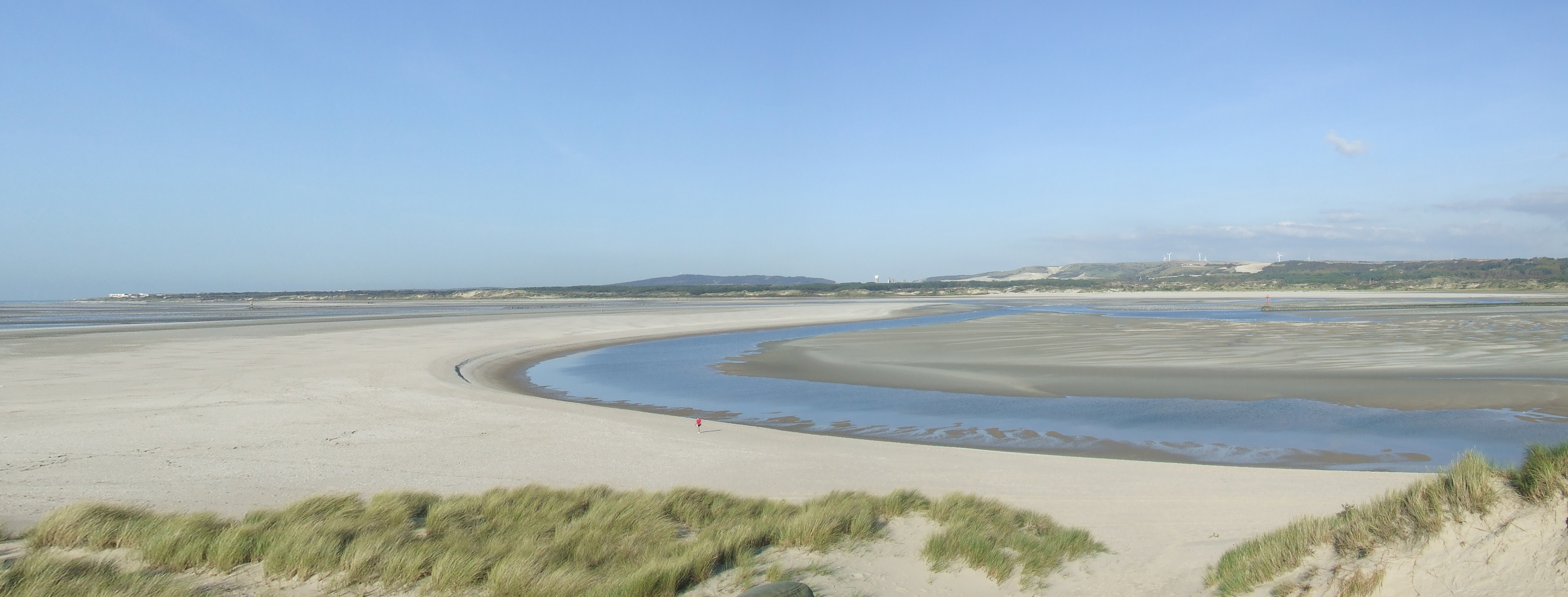
The Canche estuary at low tide, as seen from Pointe du Touquet

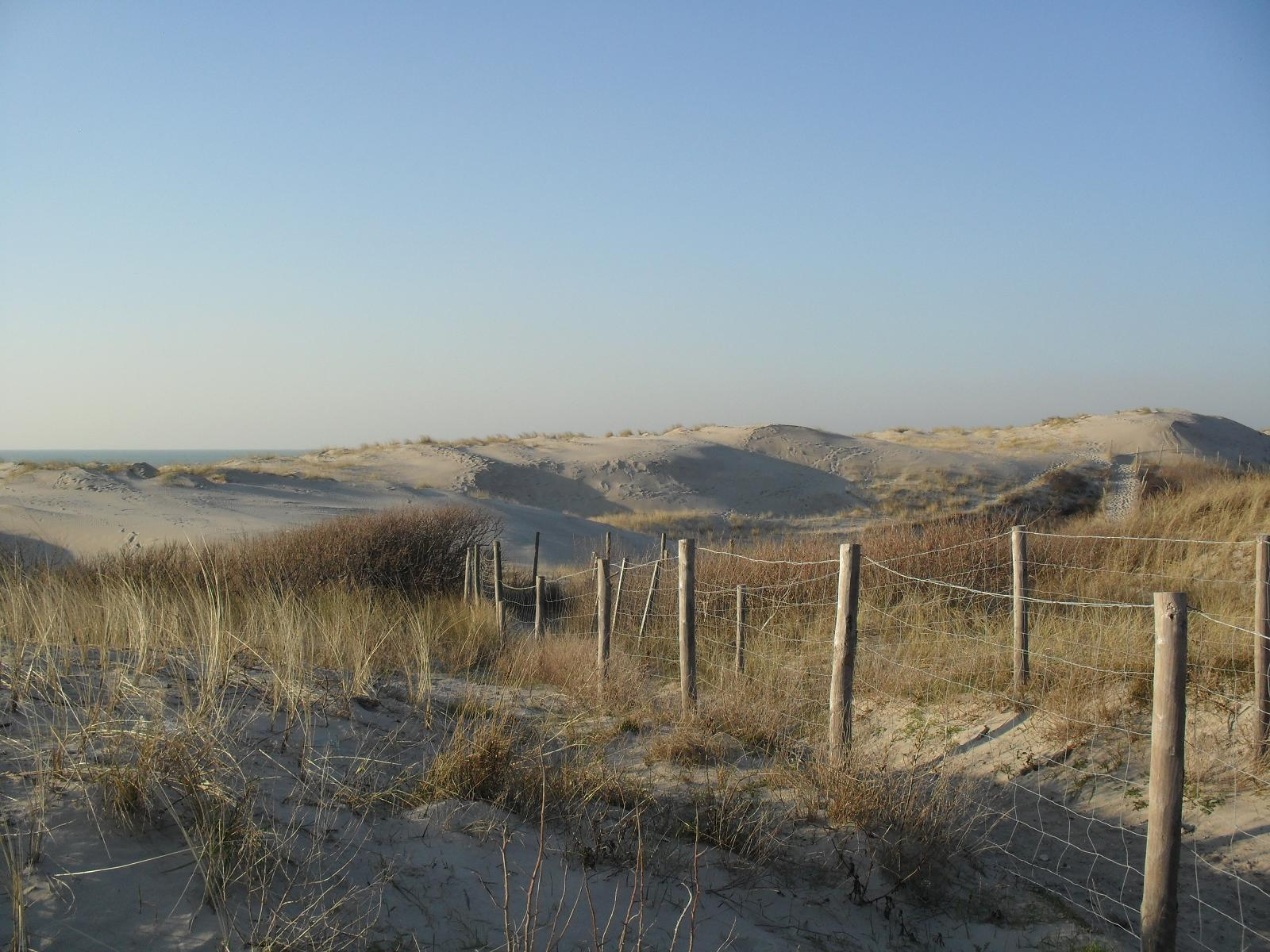
Dunes near Pointe du Touquet

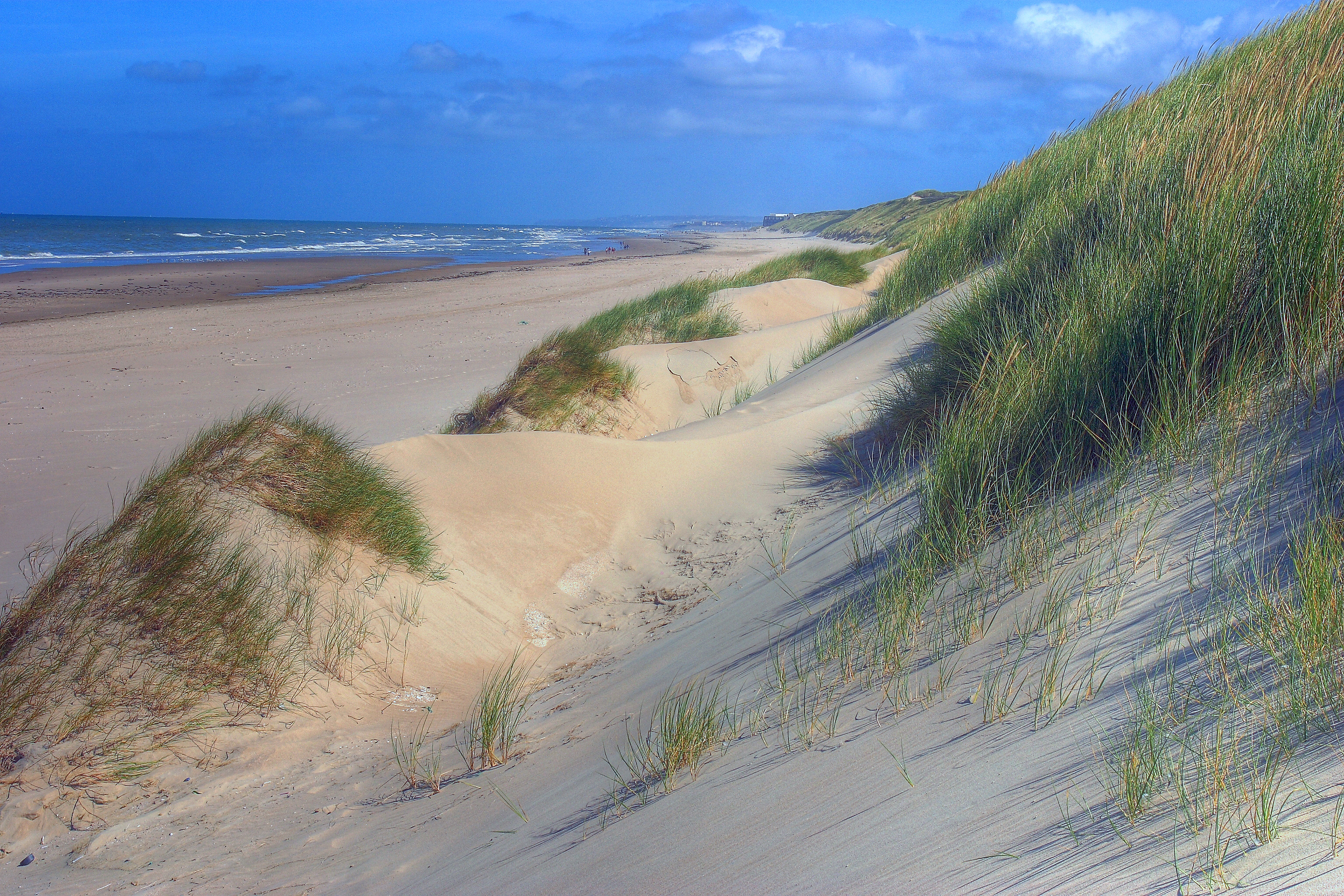
Dunes to the south of the town

Le Touquet has benefited from favourable dune creation conditions and accretion of sediments from the Canche to the southwestern bank, where it is located (in contrast to the opposite bank, which has been retreating). As the maps of the French Géoportail demonstrate, the coastline has significantly moved towards the northwest since the Cassini map or the mid-19th century Chief of Staff map of France. The main vector of land accumulation today is the Banc du Pilori, a shoal to the north of Pointe du Touquet. That accumulation may sometimes cause problems because it makes the estuary shallow and forces the river to meander, with the potential to jeopardise commercial activity of the port of Étaples and Le Touquet's marina if unregulated.

The Atlantic coast beach, stretching for more than 12 km (7.5 mi) north to south, is almost fully covered by dunes stretching several hundred metres inland. The Opal Coast has good conditions for their formation: winds predominantly blow from the west directly at the coast, the beaches and the bottom of the estuary are made of fine sand, covered with psammophytic plants, i.e., plants that are able to grow on the loose sandy substrate, thus strengthening the dunes. It was not always the case, as during the Little Ice Age, the few plants that set roots in the sand were unable to counter erosion due to storms, seawater flooding or sand being blown off by wind. The exception was the stretch between Berck and Merlimont, which could sustain forests and so dunes existed there. Alphonse Daloz's planting of a forest near Cape Le Touquet had a large role in creating and stabilising dunes in Le Touquet, while also adding much recreation value to the future resort, in contrast to the warrens that were considered at best worthless and at worst a danger for nearby inhabitants. (Note: For a detailed analysis of the plant species in the forest, see Dehay, Charles; Géhu, Jean Marie (1964). "La forêt du Touquet. Evolution d'une forêt anthropique". Bulletin de la Société Botanique de France (in French). 111 (sup2): 131–145. Bibcode:1964BSBF..111S.131D. doi:10.1080/00378941.1964.10838421. ISSN 0037-8941.)

There is evidence that the dunes have been growing since at least World War II. When German blockhouses were built as part of the Atlantic Wall during World War II, they were at the top of the dunes, where the most desirable point for such buildings is. By 2004, however, they were several metres below the peak, obstructing the view of the sea for inland structures and leaving them below the most desirable point (at the dune's peak) for seaside military buildings. A 2001 study surveying a 3,015 m (3,297 yd)-long stretch of dunes found that on 62% of the length, the dunes were accumulating sediment beyond the margin of error; the areas where the balance was negative (8% of total study length) were located immediately near the station. Several factors cause concern for the integrity of the dunes, such as large tourist traffic and the annual enduro race.

==== Environmental protection ====
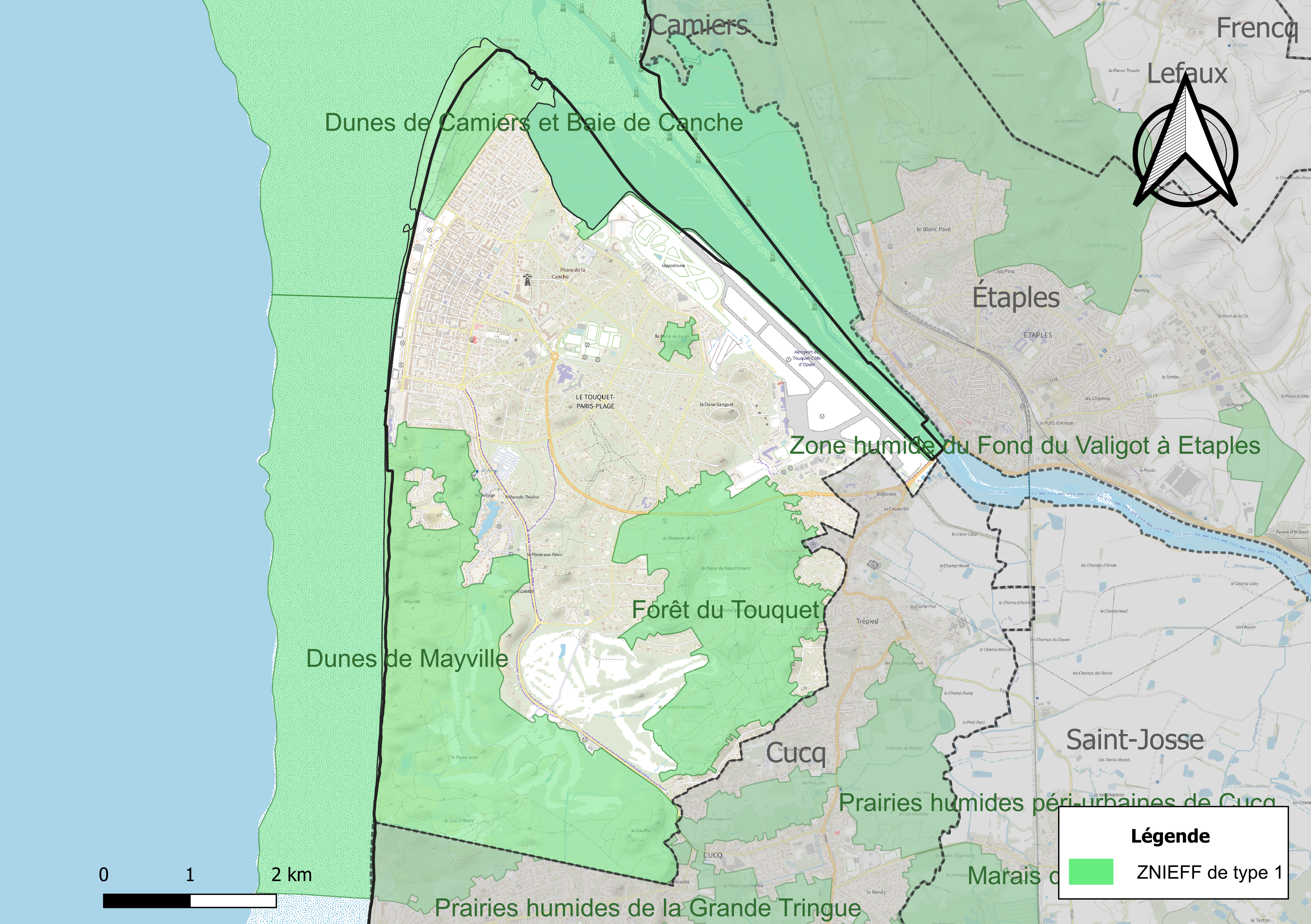
Four ZNIEFF natural heritage areas span Le Touquet; they cover its dunes, its forests and both its marine and estuarial environment

Several authorities monitor the environment around Le Touquet. In 2005, the European Commission designated the estuary of the Canche river as a Natura 2000 site under the Birds Directive. Since 2008, a wider site that covers the Canche, the Authie and the Somme estuaries, as well as the coastal waters, the dunes and the beaches between them, protects five distinct habitats under the Habitats Directive. A land-based site created in 2002 (also under the Habitats Directive) includes, among others, the dunes in the south-western part of the commune; some of those dunes were bought out in 1982 by the Conservatoire de littoral, a French government agency tasked with preserving coastal areas.

On the national level, the Pointe du Touquet, at the northern extremity of the commune, is protected as a conservation area (site classé) for its dunes and the Banc du Pilori, as established by a ministerial order in 2001. Two years earlier, the Commission supérieure des sites, perspectives et paysages, a central government body tasked with designating protected sites, advised to create a conservation site at the Pointe du Touquet specifically to prevent new construction projects planned there. Since 2012, the area is further protected by national legislation as Parc naturel marin des estuaires picards et de la mer d'Opale, one of the eight French marine parks that, in this case, cover most of the eastern English Channel coast. Le Touquet's area also presents particular interest from the geological perspective because, among the three 'Picardy-type' estuaries (that of the Canche, the Authie and the Somme), only the Canche's is not built-up and is allowed to develop on its own, which is why it is also monitored on this level. According to the Coastal Scenic Evaluation System, which assesses scenic quality, this area is among the highest-ranked in Northern France.

=== Climate ===
The weather station of Le Touquet was opened in 1947. According to the 1991–2020 climate normal, the town has a temperate oceanic climate (Köppen classification: Cfb). In comparison to France as a whole, Le Touquet features a relatively cold, rainy and cloudy climate, but average annual temperatures are warmer than in cities in the middle of the continents at the same latitude, such as Kyiv, Astana or Calgary. Winters are generally mild, humid and cloudy, and summers are warm, though by French standards they are rather cool. Average precipitation amount is rather uniform throughout the year, but there tends to be more significantly more rain in the last three months of the year. The hottest temperature ever recorded was 39.9 °C (103.8 °F) on 19 July 2022; the coldest recorded conditions were on 8 January 1985. Météo-France expects that by 2050, climate change will lead to increased temperatures in all seasons (particularly autumn), increased fire and heatwave risks, as well as some changes of precipitation patterns towards fewer days with stronger rain.

Climate data for Le Touquet, elevation: 5 m (16 ft) (1991-2020 normals, extremes 1951-present)
Month	Jan	Feb	Mar	Apr	May	Jun	Jul	Aug	Sep	Oct	Nov	Dec	Year
Record high °C (°F)	16.7 (62.1)	19.3 (66.7)	23.2 (73.8)	25.5 (77.9)	31.6 (88.9)	36.8 (98.2)	39.9 (103.8)	36.4 (97.5)	32.8 (91.0)	27.1 (80.8)	19.8 (67.6)	16.4 (61.5)	39.9 (103.8)
Mean daily maximum °C (°F)	7.6 (45.7)	8.2 (46.8)	10.9 (51.6)	14.1 (57.4)	17.2 (63.0)	19.7 (67.5)	21.4 (70.5)	21.9 (71.4)	19.5 (67.1)	15.8 (60.4)	11.3 (52.3)	8.2 (46.8)	14.7 (58.5)
Daily mean °C (°F)	5.1 (41.2)	5.3 (41.5)	7.5 (45.5)	9.9 (49.8)	13.0 (55.4)	15.6 (60.1)	17.6 (63.7)	18.0 (64.4)	15.6 (60.1)	12.4 (54.3)	8.4 (47.1)	5.7 (42.3)	11.2 (52.2)
Mean daily minimum °C (°F)	2.6 (36.7)	2.4 (36.3)	4.0 (39.2)	5.6 (42.1)	8.7 (47.7)	11.6 (52.9)	13.8 (56.8)	14.0 (57.2)	11.6 (52.9)	9.0 (48.2)	5.6 (42.1)	3.1 (37.6)	7.7 (45.9)
Record low °C (°F)	−19.1 (−2.4)	−18.2 (−0.8)	−8.9 (16.0)	−4.5 (23.9)	−2.2 (28.0)	−0.4 (31.3)	4.0 (39.2)	3.9 (39.0)	1.8 (35.2)	−3.8 (25.2)	−8.6 (16.5)	−11.6 (11.1)	−19.1 (−2.4)
Average precipitation mm (inches)	76.8 (3.02)	61.7 (2.43)	54.2 (2.13)	50.2 (1.98)	59.0 (2.32)	55.9 (2.20)	58.8 (2.31)	73.0 (2.87)	76.8 (3.02)	101.3 (3.99)	114.2 (4.50)	106.9 (4.21)	888.8 (34.99)
Average precipitation days (≥ 1.0 mm)	13.1	10.8	10.1	9.0	9.5	8.9	8.2	10.1	10.4	13.1	14.4	14.6	132.2
Average relative humidity (%)	86	81	78	75	78	78	78	79	79	84	86	86	81
Average dew point °C (°F)	3 (37)	2 (36)	4 (39)	5 (41)	9 (48)	12 (54)	14 (57)	14 (57)	12 (54)	10 (50)	6 (43)	5 (41)	8 (46)
Mean monthly sunshine hours	61.8	78.4	132.8	189.6	209.8	220.4	225.1	205.1	161.2	110.6	62.7	52.5	1,710
Source 1: Meteociel
Source 2: Time and Date

Climate data for Le Touquet (Le Touquet – Côte d'Opale Airport), 1961–1990 normals
Month	Jan	Feb	Mar	Apr	May	Jun	Jul	Aug	Sep	Oct	Nov	Dec	Year
Mean daily maximum °C (°F)	6.2 (43.2)	6.8 (44.2)	9.3 (48.7)	12.1 (53.8)	16.1 (61.0)	18.3 (64.9)	20.7 (69.3)	20.6 (69.1)	18.5 (65.3)	15.2 (59.4)	10.2 (50.4)	7.4 (45.3)	13.5 (56.3)
Daily mean °C (°F)	4.4 (39.9)	4.3 (39.7)	6.7 (44.1)	8.8 (47.8)	12.9 (55.2)	15.6 (60.1)	17.7 (63.9)	17.4 (63.3)	15.2 (59.4)	12.3 (54.1)	7.8 (46.0)	5.5 (41.9)	10.7 (51.3)
Mean daily minimum °C (°F)	2.5 (36.5)	1.8 (35.2)	4.2 (39.6)	5.5 (41.9)	9.7 (49.5)	12.8 (55.0)	14.7 (58.5)	14.1 (57.4)	11.9 (53.4)	9.5 (49.1)	5.4 (41.7)	3.6 (38.5)	8.0 (46.4)
Source: Infoclimat

== Demographics ==
Historical population of Le Touquet, within today's borders of the commune (Note: This dataset compiles numbers calculated according to three different methodologies (see Population without double counting for details). Up to 1954, population was counted on a total basis (any people within the commune, whether residing temporarily or permanently. From 1954 to 1999, the method was population without double counting, which counted soldiers and students temporarily living in the commune as residents of the commune they came from. From 2006, the population is the municipal population, which only counts people who reside permanently in that commune; all temporary residents are assigned to communes they came from.)

Year	Pop.	±% p.a.
1881	516	—
1886	521	+0.19%
1891	586	+2.38%
1896	687	+3.23%
1901	780	+2.57%
1906	1,140	+7.89%
1911	1,692	+8.22%
1921	2,595	+4.37%
1926	3,244	+4.57%
1931	3,880	+3.65%
1936	3,560	−1.71%
1946	3,296	−0.77%

Year	Pop.	±% p.a.
1954	3,625	+1.20%
1962	4,064	+1.44%
1968	4,403	+1.34%
1975	5,370	+2.88%
1982	5,204	−0.45%
1990	5,596	+0.91%
1999	5,299	−0.60%
2007	5,355	+0.13%
2012	4,588	−3.04%
2017	4,223	−1.64%
2023	4,224	+0.00%

Source: EHESS, INSEE

As of 2020, Le Touquet had 4,226 permanent and 301 temporary residents, yielding a total of 4,527 inhabitants, but real population at any given moment may change significantly based on the number of holidaymakers in the town. The Cour des Comptes estimated in 2019 that the town regularly accepts about 250,000 visitors each year. According to the 2022 data compiled by the commune, there were 950,000 overnight stays in the period from January to September of that year. Therefore, as pre-COVID estimates show, at the peak of the season in late summer, the population may boom to about 35,000 people.

Permanent population is very old, as 59.5% is older than 60, including 23.7% who are 75 or over. This compares to just 27% of over-60s in the Pas-de-Calais department and 25.6% in Hauts-de-France. There are also great differences in sex: 56% of the population is female, which may be attributable to longer life expectancy of women. Because retirees constitute a very large part of the total population, the commune has issues with natural population change. It became negative in the 1980s and, with the birth rate falling, the rate of natural increase fell even more. Between 2014 and 2020, its average rate was −1.5% per annum. The decrease was offset somewhat by a positive migration balance (+0.9% per annum) in this period, but between 1990 and 2014, the commune also experienced a mild net population outflow.

Le Touquet's household composition, just like its population pyramid, is also an outlier. Almost half of permanent residents live alone, and only 16.6% of households have any children (compared to 31.2% of one-person households in Pas-de-Calais and 40.5% households with children). This means that the average household size is 1.69, significantly below the departmental average of 2.3 people. As is typical for resorts in France, the majority of built housing is not the main place of living, but the phenomenon is particularly strong in this city. For a population of only 4,527 people, there are 12,582 residences in the resort, of which 4 in 5 are secondary residences. This is one of the highest rates in all of France and the highest in the region of Hauts-de-France. Even though there are so many residences, the vacancy rate (1%) is negligible compared to about 8% in the department, region or metropolitan France.

A median person in Le Touquet is notably richer than in the surrounding areas: annual disposable income reaches €30,130 per unit of consumption (Note: INSEE's definition of a consumption unit is defined as follows: 1 unit of consumption for the first adult in the household; 0.5 units for each following person in the household 14 or over and 0.3 units for children under 14.) in Le Touquet, compared to just over €20,000 in Pas-de-Calais department and the region of Hauts-de-France and €22,800 in metropolitan France. Poverty rates are also significantly lower: 10% in Le Touquet compared to 17–18% in the wider region. However, according to the Cour des Comptes assessment, in 2014 the median annual household income as a whole (€23,967) did not stand out compared to surrounding areas.

== Government and politics ==
=== Local administrative entities ===
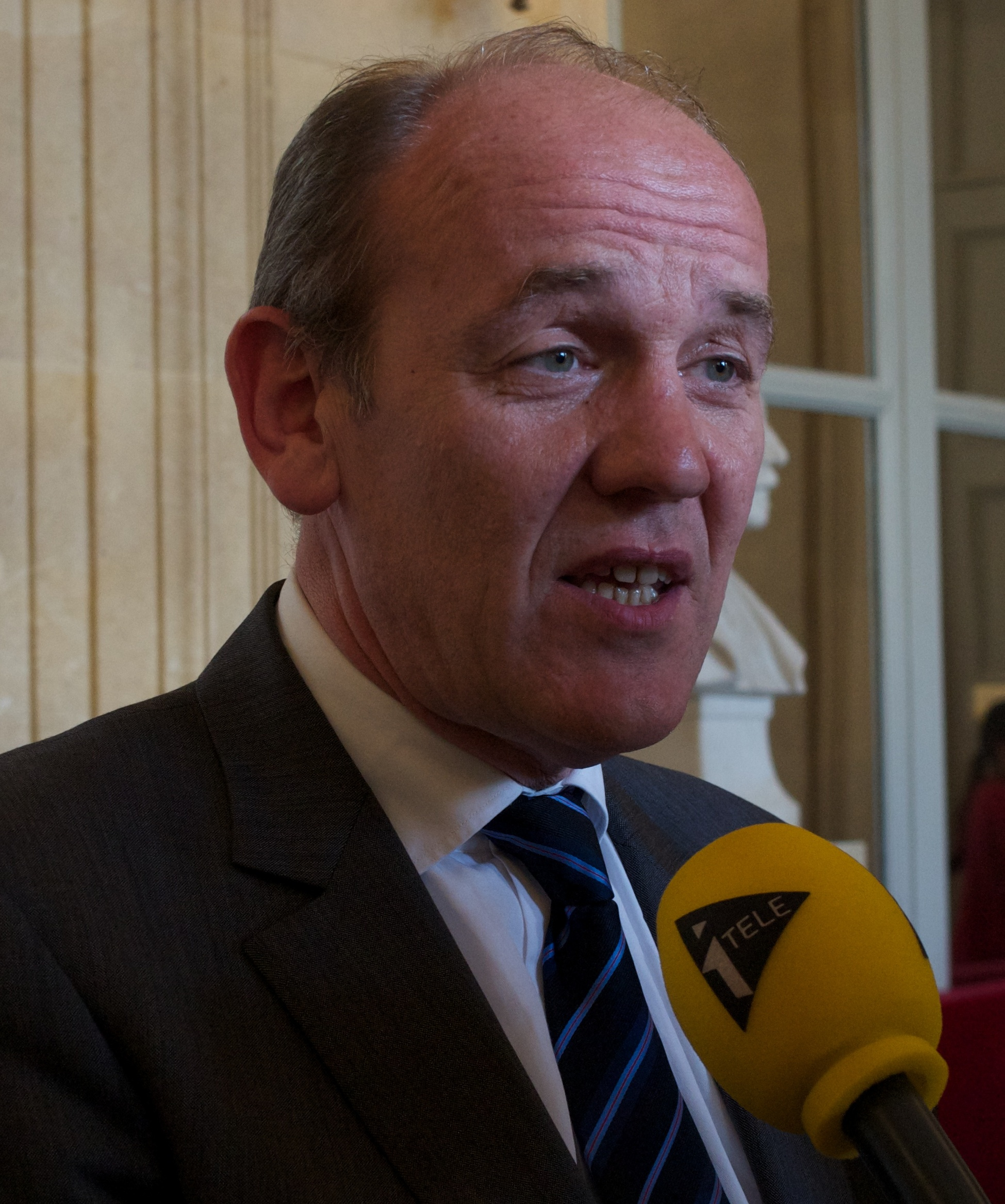
Daniel Fasquelle (LR), current mayor of Le Touquet (2020-2026), as pictured in 2013

As in other communes of France, citizens of the European Union who are on the electoral roll in Le Touquet elect its municipal council (conseil municipal). According to the Regional and Local Authorities Code and the Election Code, Le Touquet has 27 municipal councillors elected for six-year terms on a proportional representation basis but with bonus seats for the majority list. That council then elects the mayor (maire), who leads the commune and the municipal council. The current term started in 2020 and will finish in 2026. Previous mayors include Léonce Deprez (1969–1995; 2001–2008) and Jules Pouget (1934–1963, with several interruptions due to World War II). For local administration purposes, Le Touquet defines ten districts with one or two trusted members called ambassadors, whose role is to be a relay between the municipal government and the neighbourhood. They may, though need not be, members of the municipal council.

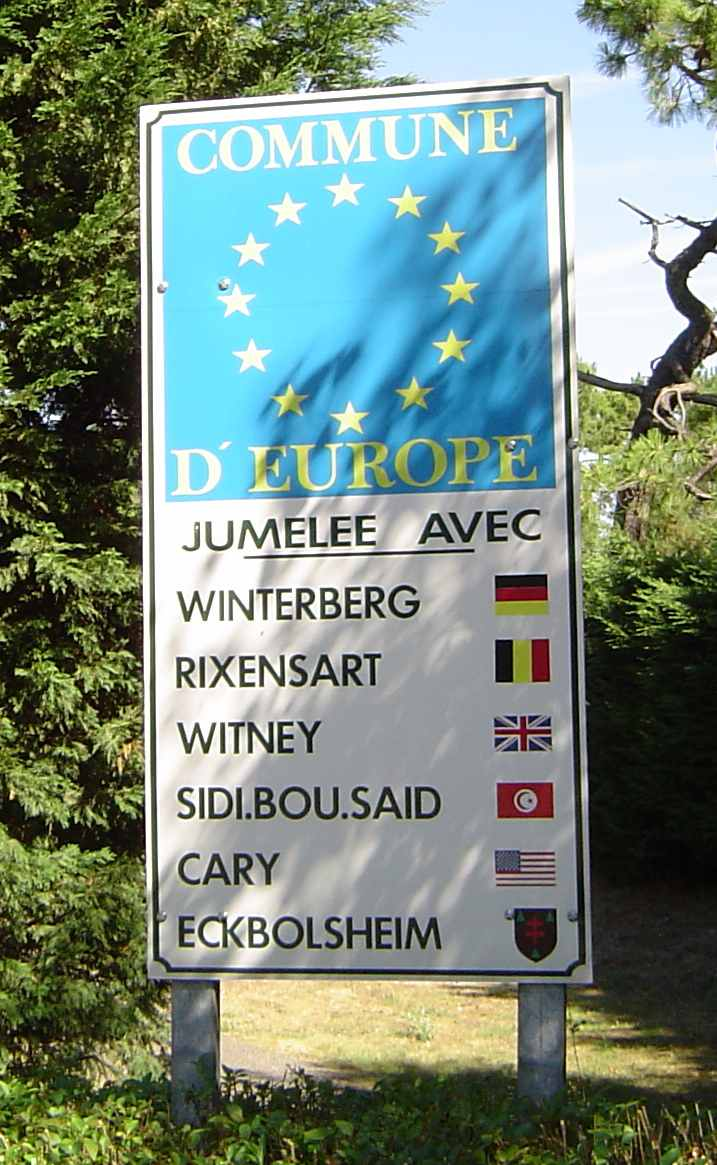
Twinned cities sign in Le Touquet, as of 2006

Le Touquet belongs to the Communauté d'agglomération des Deux Baies en Montreuillois (CA2BM), an intercommunality created in January 2017 with the seat in a small inland town of Montreuil-sur-Mer. Le Touquet sends four municipal councillors to the 82-member-strong intercommunal council. Among the more important statutory powers of the council are waste and water management, urban development and public transport. Before that, Le Touquet was the headquarters of a looser Communauté de communes mer et terres d'Opale, but a local government reform in 2015 forced the intercommunalities in Montreuil (which failed the minimum population threshold introduced by that reform), Le Touquet and Berck to be one bigger unit, by order of the prefect of Pas-de-Calais. A unit called Agence d'attractivité en Opale-Canche-Authie is a tourist board for the local region, and is separate from CA2BM, but a Cour des Comptes report in 2020 found it to be in organisational chaos, not least because its precise role is unclear.

Central government organs are not represented in Le Touquet. The subprefecture for Le Touquet is located in Montreuil-sur-Mer, about 18 km (11 mi) to the southeast, and the department seat is in Arras, 100 km (62 mi) away. Courts with jurisdiction in the commune are scattered around the region: general courts (tribunal judiciaire) as well as commercial, labour courts and courts for minors are located in Boulogne-sur-Mer; Montreuil-sur-Mer has the justice of the peace court (tribunal de proximité) and the agricultural land court; the cour d'assises (the court deciding felony cases) is in Saint-Omer and the administrative court of the first instance is in the regional capital of Lille.

For statistical purposes, Insee groups Le Touquet within the urban unit of Berck, but at the same time defines Le Touquet as one of the centres of a local functional (metropolitan) area.

=== Elections ===
Le Touquet is located in the canton of Étaples, which elects one man and one woman to the departmental council of Pas-de-Calais for a six-year term, currently Philippe Fait (RE) and Geneviève Margueritte. Since 2022, Fait, a native of Cucq, is also a deputy to the National Assembly for the Pas-de-Calais's 4th constituency. Before him, this district previously elected two of Le Touquet's mayors, Fasquelle (vice-president and former treasurer of the Republicans, and also an Hauts-de-France regional councillor from 2021) and Deprez.

According to the population quota of Article 284 the Electoral Code, 15 municipal councillors may participate in an electoral college to choose senators. Mayor Jules Pouget was a senator of Council of the Republic for one term (1948–1952) under the Fourth Republic.

Le Touquet traditionally leans conservative, which contrasts with the neighbouring town of Étaples. The arrondissement of Montreuil-sur-Mer is on a long-term trend more right-wing than the department as a whole, and the canton of Étaples is the most conservative part of that arrondissement. However, since Emmanuel Macron's election to the presidency in 2017, his native city of Amiens and Le Touquet became Macronist strongholds, though right-leaning parties (except the far-right National Rally) still get relatively more support. President Macron has significant attachment to the city: he votes in Le Touquet and regularly spends time when not in Paris in the town. His wife, Brigitte, inherited a villa in 1985. While it was sold in September 2025, the couple still owns residential property in the city.

==== Results ====
All results in the table are sorted by the share of vote in the whole constituency.

Presidential elections

2012 Presidential election
Candidate	Party	First round		Second round	
Candidate	Party	Votes	%	Votes	%
François Hollande	Socialist Party	518	12.37	922	21.98
Nicolas Sarkozy (incumbent)	Union for a Popular Movement	2,533	60.47	3,273	78.02
Marine Le Pen	National Front	498	11.89		
Jean-Luc Mélenchon	Left Front	150	3.58		
François Bayrou	Democratic Movement	348	8.31		
Eva Joly	Europe Ecology – The Greens	46	1.10		
Nicolas Dupont-Aignan	Republic Arise	50	1.19		
Philippe Poutou	New Anticapitalist Party	26	0.62		
Nathalie Arthaud	Workers' Struggle	13	0.31		
Jacques Cheminade	Solidarity and Progress	7	0.17		
Total		4,189	100.00	4,195	100.00
Valid votes		4,189	99.12	4,195	96.28
Invalid/blank votes		37	0.88	162	3.72
Total votes		4,226	100.00	4,357	100.00
Registered voters/turnout		5,293	79.84	5,296	82.27
Source: Ministry of the Interior

2017 Presidential election
Candidate	Party	First round		Second round	
Candidate	Party	Votes	%	Votes	%
Emmanuel Macron	La République En Marche!	1,291	30.39	3,034	81.08
Marine Le Pen	National Front	383	9.02	708	18.92
François Fillon	The Republicans	2,158	50.80		
Jean-Luc Mélenchon	La France Insoumise	193	4.54		
Benoît Hamon	Socialist Party	59	1.39		
Nicolas Dupont-Aignan	Debout la France	93	2.19		
Jean Lassalle	Résistons!	15	0.35		
Philippe Poutou	New Anticapitalist Party	20	0.47		
François Asselineau	Popular Republican Union	20	0.47		
Nathalie Arthaud	Workers' Struggle	16	0.38		
Jacques Cheminade	Solidarity and Progress	0	0.00		
Total		4,248	100.00	3,742	100.00
Valid votes		4,248	99.04	3,742	90.47
Invalid votes		19	0.44	99	2.39
Blank votes		22	0.51	295	7.13
Total votes		4,289	100.00	4,136	100.00
Registered voters/turnout		5,208	82.35	5,208	79.42
Source: Ministry of the Interior

2022 Presidential election
Candidate	Party	First round		Second round	
Candidate	Party	Votes	%	Votes	%
Emmanuel Macron (incumbent)	La République En Marche!	2,315	55.78	3,217	78.43
Marine Le Pen	National Rally	443	10.67	885	21.57
Jean-Luc Mélenchon	La France Insoumise	162	3.90		
Éric Zemmour	Reconquête	481	11.59		
Valérie Pécresse	The Republicans	469	11.30		
Yannick Jadot	Europe Ecology – The Greens	71	1.71		
Jean Lassalle	Résistons!	71	1.71		
Fabien Roussel	French Communist Party	35	0.84		
Nicolas Dupont-Aignan	Debout la France	55	1.33		
Anne Hidalgo	Socialist Party	20	0.48		
Philippe Poutou	New Anticapitalist Party	14	0.34		
Nathalie Arthaud	Lutte Ouvrière	14	0.34		
Total		4,150	100.00	4,102	100.00
Valid votes		4,150	99.02	4,102	94.89
Invalid votes		20	0.48	62	1.43
Blank votes		21	0.50	159	3.68
Total votes		4,191	100.00	4,323	100.00
Registered voters/turnout		5,342	78.45	5,340	80.96
Source: Ministry of the Interior

National Assembly elections for the Pas-de-Calais's 4th constituency

2017 election to the National Assembly for the Pas-de-Calais's 4th constituency
Candidate	Party	First round		Second round	
Candidate	Party	Votes	%	Votes	%
Daniel Fasquelle (incumbent)	The Republicans	1,380	40.89	1,725	50.42
Thibaut Guilluy	La République En Marche!	1,692	50.13	1,696	49.58
Benoît Dolle	National Front	160	4.74		
Anaïs Alliot	La France Insoumise	48	1.42		
Blandine Drain	Socialist Party	38	1.13		
Stéphane Sieczkowski-Samier	Miscellaneous right	15	0.44		
Martine Minne	Europe Ecology – The Greens	20	0.59		
Patrick Macquet	Far left	4	0.12		
Gwendoline Joos	Independent	15	0.44		
Estelle Gacquiere	Far left	3	0.09		
Total		3,375	100.00	3,421	100.00
Valid votes		3,375	98.71	3,421	97.16
Invalid votes		14	0.41	36	1.02
Blank votes		30	0.88	64	1.82
Total votes		3,419	100.00	3,521	100.00
Registered voters/turnout		5,198	65.78	5,198	67.74
Source: Ministry of the Interior

2022 election to the National Assembly for the Pas-de-Calais's 4th constituency
Candidate	Party	First round		Second round	
Candidate	Party	Votes	%	Votes	%
Philippe Fait	Renaissance	1,821	56.71	2,601	81.64
Françoise Vanpeene	National Rally	185	5.76	585	18.36
Mary Bonvoisin	The Republicans	759	23.64		
Blandine Drain	New Ecological and Social People's Union	125	3.89		
David Sergent	Reconquête	206	6.42		
Evelyne Ameye	Europe Ecology – The Greens	57	1.78		
Dominique Hericourt	Far left	21	0.65		
Mervyn Hoff	Far right	10	0.31		
Jean-Michel Andreau	Sovereign Right	24	0.75		
Karen Delattre	Far left	3	0.09		
Total		3,211	100.00	3,186	100.00
Valid votes		3,211	98.65	3,186	96.96
Invalid votes		14	0.43	36	1.10
Blank votes		30	0.92	64	1.95
Total votes		3,255	100.00	3,286	100.00
Registered voters/turnout		5,198	62.62	5,198	63.22
Source: Ministry of the Interior

2024 election to the National Assembly for the Pas-de-Calais's 4th constituency
Candidate	Party	First round		Second round	
Candidate	Party	Votes	%	Votes	%
Philippe Fait (incumbent)	Ensemble	2,156	55.62	2,743	69.08
Benoît Dolle	National Rally	932	24.05	1,228	30.92
Blandine Drain	New Popular Front	545	14.06		
Clémence Lambert	The Republicans	172	4.44		
Jérémy Durand	Miscellaneous centre	15	0.39		
Fanny Judek	Reconquête	44	1.14		
Dominique Hericourt	Far left	12	0.31		
Total		3,876	100.00	3,971	100.00
Valid votes		3,876	98.85	3,971	97.83
Invalid votes		15	0.38	22	0.54
Blank votes		30	0.77	66	1.63
Total votes		3,921	100.00	4,059	100.00
Registered voters/turnout		5,330	73.56	5,328	76.18
Source: Ministry of the Interior

Elections to the European Parliament – party lists receiving no votes are not shown

2014 European Parliament election for the constituency of North-West France
Party	Votes	%
National Front (NI)	487	18.29
Union for a Popular Movement (EPP)	1,139	42.79
Union of the Left (France) (PES)	143	5.37
UDI – MoDem (ALDE)	415	15.59
Europe Ecology (Greens-EFA)	97	3.64
Left Front list (GUE/NGL)	27	1.01
Debout la France	121	4.55
New Deal	37	1.39
Lutte Ouvrière	10	0.38
Nous Citoyens	119	4.47
Citizens for None of the Above	24	0.90
For the Europe of Workers and People	2	0.08
Force vie Nord-Ouest	2	0.08
Europe Citoyenne	10	0.38
Popular Republican Union	17	0.64
Pirate Party	7	0.26
Europe–Democracy–Esperanto	1	0.04
European Federalist Party	2	0.08
Radicalement Citoyen	2	0.08
Total	2,662	100.00
Valid votes	2,662	98.30
Invalid votes	21	0.78
Blank votes	25	0.92
Total votes	2,708	100.00
Registered voters/turnout	5,198	52.10
Source: Ministry of the Interior

2019 European Parliament election (country-wide constituency)
Party	Votes	%
National Rally (ID)	372	11.84
Renaissance (ALDE)	1,554	49.46
Europe Ecology (Greens-EFA)	191	6.08
Union of the Right and the Centre (EPP)	672	21.39
La France Insoumise (GUE/NGL)	36	1.15
Socialist Party-led list (PES)	67	2.13
Debout la France	64	2.04
French Communist Party	9	0.29
Génération.s	19	0.60
Animalist Party	55	1.75
Union of Democrats and Independents	47	1.50
Lutte Ouvrière	4	0.13
The Patriots	10	0.32
Together for Frexit	15	0.48
The Yellow Alliance	3	0.10
Ecology Emergency	17	0.54
The Forgotten of Europe (ACPLI)	1	0.03
European Federalist Party	2	0.06
Europe–Democracy–Esperanto	1	0.03
Reconquest List	2	0.06
Allons enfants	1	0.03
Total	3,142	100.00
Valid votes	3,142	96.89
Invalid votes	101	3.11
Blank votes	0	0.00
Total votes	3,243	100.00
Registered voters/turnout	5,170	62.73
Source: Ministry of the Interior

2024 European Parliament election (country-wide constituency)
Party	Votes	%
National Rally (PfE)	637	19.48
Ensemble (ALDE)	1,201	36.73
Socialist Party-led List (PES)	180	5.50
La France Insoumise (GUE/NGL)	37	1.13
The Republicans (EPP)	671	20.52
Europe Ecology (Greens-EFA)	52	1.59
Reconquête!	331	10.12
French Communist Party	13	0.40
Rural Alliance	63	1.93
Animalist Party	49	1.50
Ecology at the Centre	12	0.37
Asselineau-Frexit list	11	0.34
Lutte Ouvrière	6	0.18
Écologie Positive	2	0.06
Equinox Party (Green party)	1	0.03
No! Get yourself in order (far-right list)	2	0.06
Workers' Party	1	0.03
European Citizen Party	1	0.03
Total	3,270	100.00
Valid votes	3,270	98.05
Invalid votes	47	1.41
Blank votes	18	0.54
Total votes	3,335	100.00
Registered voters/turnout	5,360	62.22
Source: Ministry of the Interior

Elections to local government councils

2015 elections to the Regional Council of Nord-Pas-de-Calais-Picardie, sorted by results in the Pas-de-Calais department (Note: The person mentioned in the candidate column is the leader of that list))
Candidate	Party	First round		Second round	
Candidate	Party	Votes	%	Votes	%
Xavier Bertrand	The Republicans	1,790	70.03	2,601	76.73
Marine Le Pen	National Rally	185	7.24	789	23.27
Pierre de Saintignon	Socialist Party	310	12.13		
Fabien Roussel	French Communist Party	23	0.90		
Sandrine Rousseau	Europe Ecology – The Greens	62	2.43		
Jean-Philippe Tanguy	Debout la France	79	3.09		
Eric Pecqueur	Far left	11	0.43		
Sylvain Blondel	Miscellaneous right	78	3.05		
Eric Mascaro	Independent	18	0.70		
Total		2,556	100.00	3,390	100.00
Valid votes		2,556	97.82	3,390	96.47
Invalid votes		21	0.80	47	1.34
Blank votes		36	1.38	77	2.19
Total votes		2,613	100.00	3,514	100.00
Registered voters/turnout		5,280	49.49	5,280	66.55
Source: Ministry of the Interior

2021 elections to the Regional Council of Hauts-de-France, sorted by results in the Pas-de-Calais department
Candidate	Party	First round		Second round	
Candidate	Party	Votes	%	Votes	%
Xavier Bertrand	The Republicans	1,253	55.49	1,760	80.37
Sébastien Chenu	National Rally	286	12.67	285	13.01
Karima Delli	Europe Ecology – The Greens – Socialist Party	84	3.72	145	6.62
Laurent Pietraszewski	Union of Centre	589	26.09		
Eric Pecqueur	Far left	20	0.89		
José Évrard	Sovereign Right	19	0.84		
Audric Alexandre	Independent	7	0.31		
Total		2,258	100.00	2,190	100.00
Valid votes		2,258	97.41	2,190	95.13
Invalid votes		36	1.55	68	2.95
Blank votes		24	1.04	44	1.91
Total votes		2,318	100.00	2,302	100.00
Registered voters/turnout		5,151	45.00	5,151	44.69
Source: Ministry of the Interior

2015 departmental elections – Canton of Étaples
Candidate	Party	First round		Second round	
Candidate	Party	Votes	%	Votes	%
Philippe Fait and Geneviève Margueritte	Miscellaneous right (Union of the right)	1,547	60.19	1,886	76.89
Élise Filliette and Francis Leroy	National Rally	560	21.79	567	23.11
Fanny Benoît and Stéphane Sagnier	Union of the left	259	10.08		
Jean-Paul Hagneré and Brigitte Siodmak-Peron	Independent	204	7.94		
Total		2,570	100.00	2,453	100.00
Valid votes		2,570	96.22	2,453	93.27
Invalid votes		37	1.39	64	2.43
Blank votes		64	2.40	113	4.30
Total votes		2,671	100.00	2,630	100.00
Registered voters/turnout		5,244	50.93	5,243	50.16
Source: Ministry of the Interior

2021 departmental elections – Canton of Étaples
Candidate	Party	First round		Second round	
Candidate	Party	Votes	%	Votes	%
Philippe Fait and Geneviève Margueritte (incumbents)	Miscellaneous right (Union of the right)	1,559	71.48	1,880	86.24
Aurélie Baillet and Guillaume Delplanque	National Rally	348	15.96	300	13.76
Ingrid Dewost and François Emmerlinck	Miscellaneous left	274	12.56		
Total		2,181	100.00	2,180	100.00
Valid votes		2,181	95.83	2,180	95.70
Invalid votes		37	1.63	51	2.24
Blank votes		58	2.55	47	2.06
Total votes		2,276	100.00	2,278	100.00
Registered voters/turnout		5,151	44.19	5,151	44.22
Source: Ministry of the Interior

2020 municipal elections
Candidate	Party	First round			Second round		
Candidate	Party	Votes	%	Seats	Votes	%	Seats
Daniel Fasquelle (incumbent)	Miscellaneous right (The Republicans)	1,091	38.28	0	1,880	53.12	21
Olivier Lebreuilly (Note: Despite gaining the second place in the first round, Lebreuilly decided to form a coalition with Bernard and Pierre to oppose Fasquelle in the second round. Because it was led by Juliette Bernard, it was her and not Lebreuilly who advanced to the second round)	La République En Marche!	812	28.49	0			
Juliette Bernard	Miscellaneous centre (Note: Second-round affiliation – was labelled "miscellaneous right" in the first round)	654	22.95	0	1,659	46.88	6
Hervé Pierre	Miscellaneous right	293	10.28	0			
Total		2,850	100.00	0	3,539	100.00	27
Valid votes		2,850	98.11		3,539	97.92	
Invalid votes		37	1.27		38	1.05	
Blank votes		18	0.62		37	1.02	
Total votes		2,905	100.00		3,614	100.00	
Registered voters/turnout		5,263	55.20		5,236	69.02	
Source: Ministry of the Interior

== Economy ==
Almost all of the economy of Le Touquet revolves around tourism. Revenues coming from it allow the commune to punch way above what would be typical of the commune of its size. According to the assessment of the Cour des Comptes, even though Le Touquet has about 4,200 people, its budget size would normally have been expected of a commune of 30,000. In 2011–2021, annual communal expenditures oscillated around €31–36 million; revenues beat the €40 million mark in 2017 and 2019 (for communes between 3,500 and 5,000 people, the average budget is just €4 million). Le Touquet's debt, at €16.4 million in 2021, is much higher than average, but also the commune's budget surplus would allow it to repay it in 3.5 years, faster than the average of 4.5 years. Even though a 2023 law allowed Le Touquet to levy a surcharge on secondary residences, it chose not to.

The commune's workforce activity statistics are not typical for France. In 2020, 51.6% of the population was retired and another 15.2% were not economically active, but the commune's companies and institutions still provided 3,790 jobs. Due to heavy tourism influence, almost 90% of companies in Le Touquet are in the service sector, much higher than the French average of 65%. This may lead to problems when typical tourism patterns are disrupted. For example, when the Enduropale motor race was cancelled in 2021 due to the COVID-19 pandemic, the commune's economy missed out on €5 million of economic activity. On the other hand, 2022 and 2023 proved to be bumper years, the former because it was when the economy emerged from COVID-19 (950,000 overnight stays in the town) and the latter for the region as a whole due to particularly strong presence of foreign tourists from neighbouring countries.

Historically (before World War II), Le Touquet boasted an enormous tourism accommodation capacity, reaching 3,800 rooms, among which 1,000 in luxury hotels. By 1965, the hotel capacity shrank to 1,540 rooms, and so did the number of hotels: it fell from 123 in 1929 to 48 in 1961 and further to only 15 in 2011. Still, as of 1 January 2025, the commune's tourist capacity is fairly large: the commune has 20 hotels with 1,019 rooms, 205 camping pitches and 449 beds in two apartment hotels. There is also an estimated 1,300 homestay beds (offered through platforms such as Airbnb or Booking), whose registration is mandatory with the mayoral office of the commune for hotel tax collection purposes. In July 2025, the commune unveiled 92 studio apartments for seasonal workers, students of the hospitality trade school and the Republican Guards.

== Architecture and urbanism ==
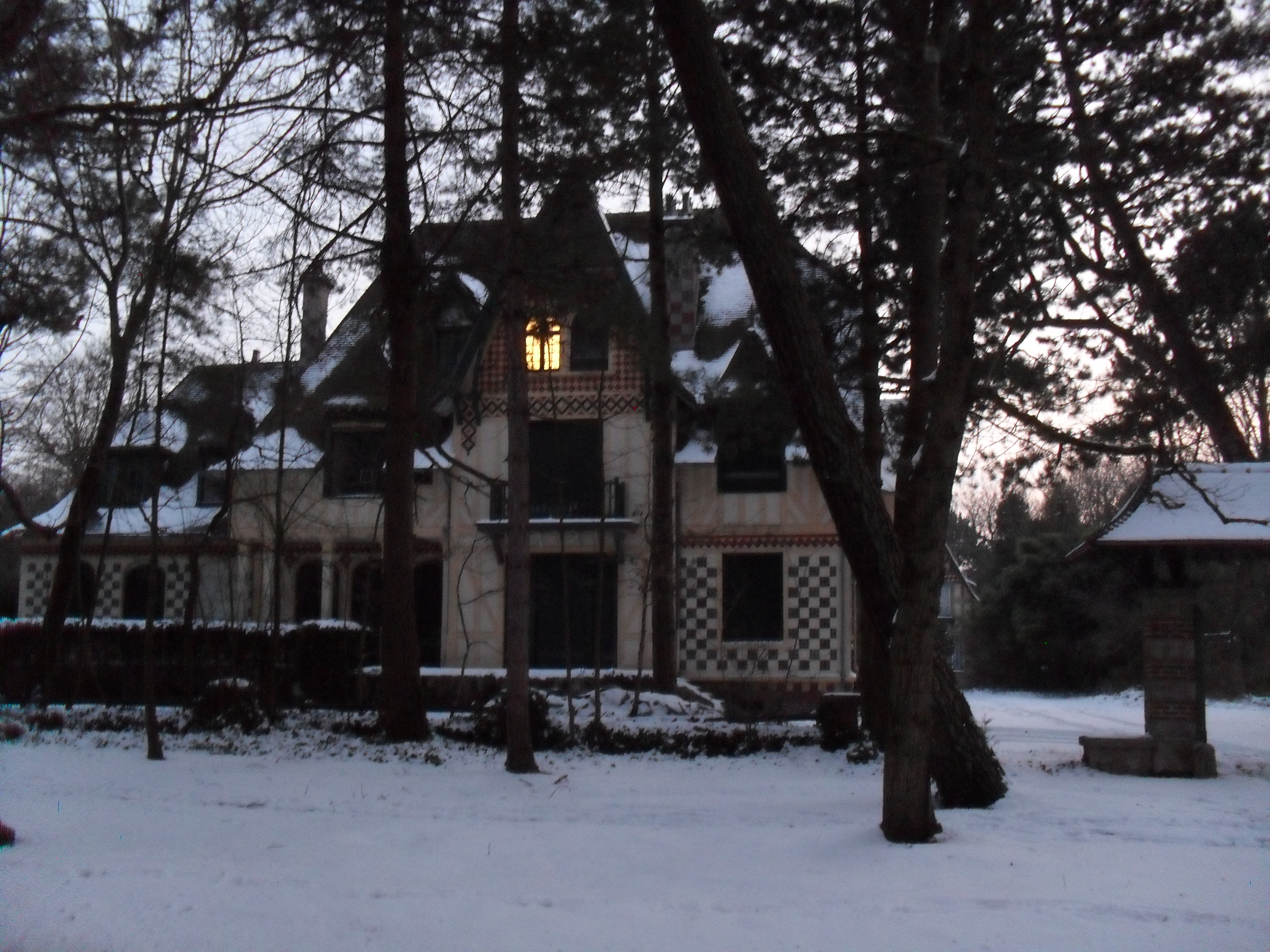
Villa Nirvana (1910), one of the buildings in the forest area of Le Touquet

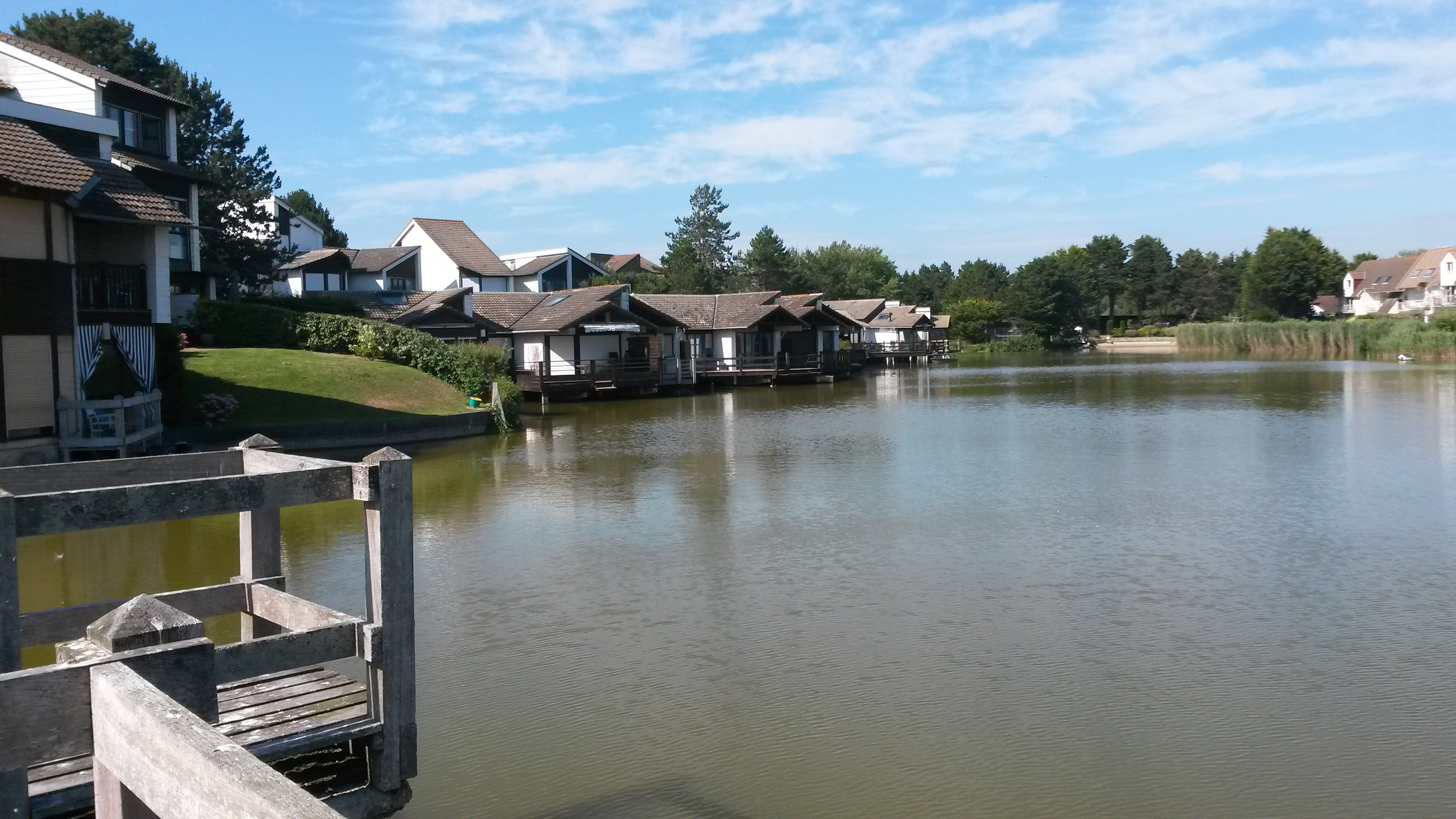
Mayvillages development from the 1970s around a lake

Le Touquet can be divided into three broad areas, each with different architecture and socioeconomic status (with relatively little social mobility between them). According to Valérie Deldrève of INRAE Nouvelle Aquitaine-Bordeaux, these are the city centre, the forest and the dunes. The city centre is located in the northwestern part of the commune. It features a concrete promenade and the beach. Some of the area in the northern part of the city centre is occupied by social housing, where 600 tenants, mostly local government employees, live. The area used to be occupied by a warehouse and a communal landfill. To the city centre's east is the forest area, which consists of villas, some as old as the town itself, whose owners are mostly upper-class (company executives, members of liberal professions and retirees who used to be either of those) and for whom the house is a secondary residence. The dunes, in the southern part of the commune, are the site of numerous post-war subdivisions (Mayvillage, West Green, Whitley) catering to the ambitions of upper-middle class owners, but further development there was halted due to concerns about the impact on the dunes.

The older buildings in Le Touquet are among the most prominent examples of the so-called "Anglo-Norman" architectural style, combining an aesthetic seen elsewhere in Northern France with Anglo-Saxon influences. An example of this fusion is the city hall building, which on top of this style also adds a belfry and a carillon, design elements typical for similar older structures in Picardy and Flanders. The whole area of the commune has been covered as a notable heritage site (site patrimonial remarquable) or by similar designations since 2005.

Le Touquet has also been recognized for its abundance of greenery. The town's assessment in the Concours des villes et villages fleuris shows the maximum grade of four flowers. Within that competition, Le Touquet received the grand prix in 2006 and the Prix National de l'Arbre (National Tree Award) in 2007, a special award of that organisation. In 2022, the French minister of culture also granted a label of "Remarkable Garden" to a route in the centre of the city and near the conference hall. In 2023, Le Touquet was recognized as a commune friendly for dogs via the "Toutourisme" label. Because of these various factors, as well as abundant infrastructure, Ville de rêve, a French startup that attempts to numerically estimate the quality of life in each commune of France based on public data, gave Le Touquet the grade of 77.9/100, the highest in the department and 199th out of 34,990 in France. According to another rating published in cooperation with Le Journal du Dimanche, Le Touquet is on 1796th position out of 34,808 and 29th among 890 communes assessed in the department.

These high ratings, and the fact Le Touquet is a seaside resort, create a lot of interest in its real estate, which winds its prices to very high values. In March 2024, average prices went above the €10,000 per square metre mark, higher than any other city in the department. Prices are comparable to Paris; some of the 122% price growth from 2017 may be attributable to the presence of the presidential couple in the town. In April 2025, Brigitte Macron sold her inherited villa for €3.6 million, which would imply a valuation at over €14,000 per square metre.

== Leisure and heritage ==
=== Sport ===
==== Motorsports ====
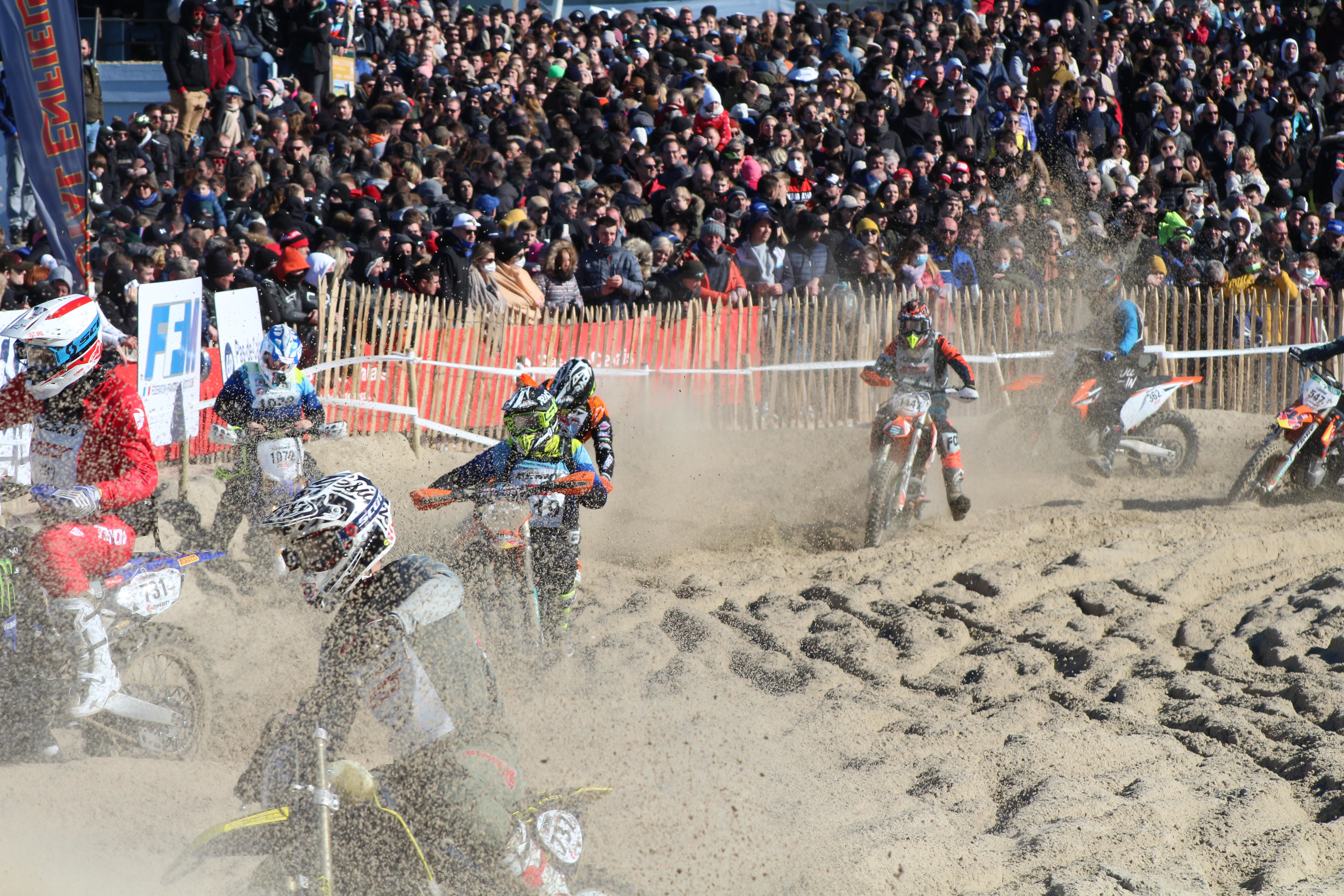
Enduropale, an enduro beach race, is the principal sports event in Le Touquet in winter (here, the 2022 edition is shown)

Every year in February, an off-road motorcycle and quad beach race called Enduropale (formerly Enduro du Touquet) is held on Le Touquet's beach. It was started in 1975 on the initiative of Mayor Léonce Deprez and Thierry Sabine, the creator of the Dakar Rally, with 286 participants. The event was a success as spectator count ballooned to 250,000 to 300,000 by the end of the 20th century and to 500,000 people in the late 2010s. The event was cancelled twice: in 1991 because of the Gulf War and in 2021 due to the COVID-19 pandemic; it also had to reroute the racetrack to avoid damaging the dunes, in part because of an administrative court ruling that retroactively declared the 2002 edition illegal for violating the total traffic ban in the protected dune zone. However, the event's popularity proved resilient and beat records in post-COVID editions, surpassing 700,000 visitors in 2025. Around 1,100 to 1,300 motorcycles and about 350 quad bikes, driven by more than 2,000 contestants, participate in this race. The Enduropale has been the first race of the Fédération Internationale de Motocyclisme's annual Sand Race World Cup since the competition was announced in 2023.

Le Touquet also has some automobile racing significance. After the Doullens-Le Touquet race in 1904, the Automobile Club of France held an international meeting in this town in July 1911, followed by a race of elegance and tourism cars. Today rally racers participate in the Rallye of Le Touquet, which covers most of the department of Pas-de-Calais. Its 64th edition was held in mid-March 2024.

==== Tennis ====
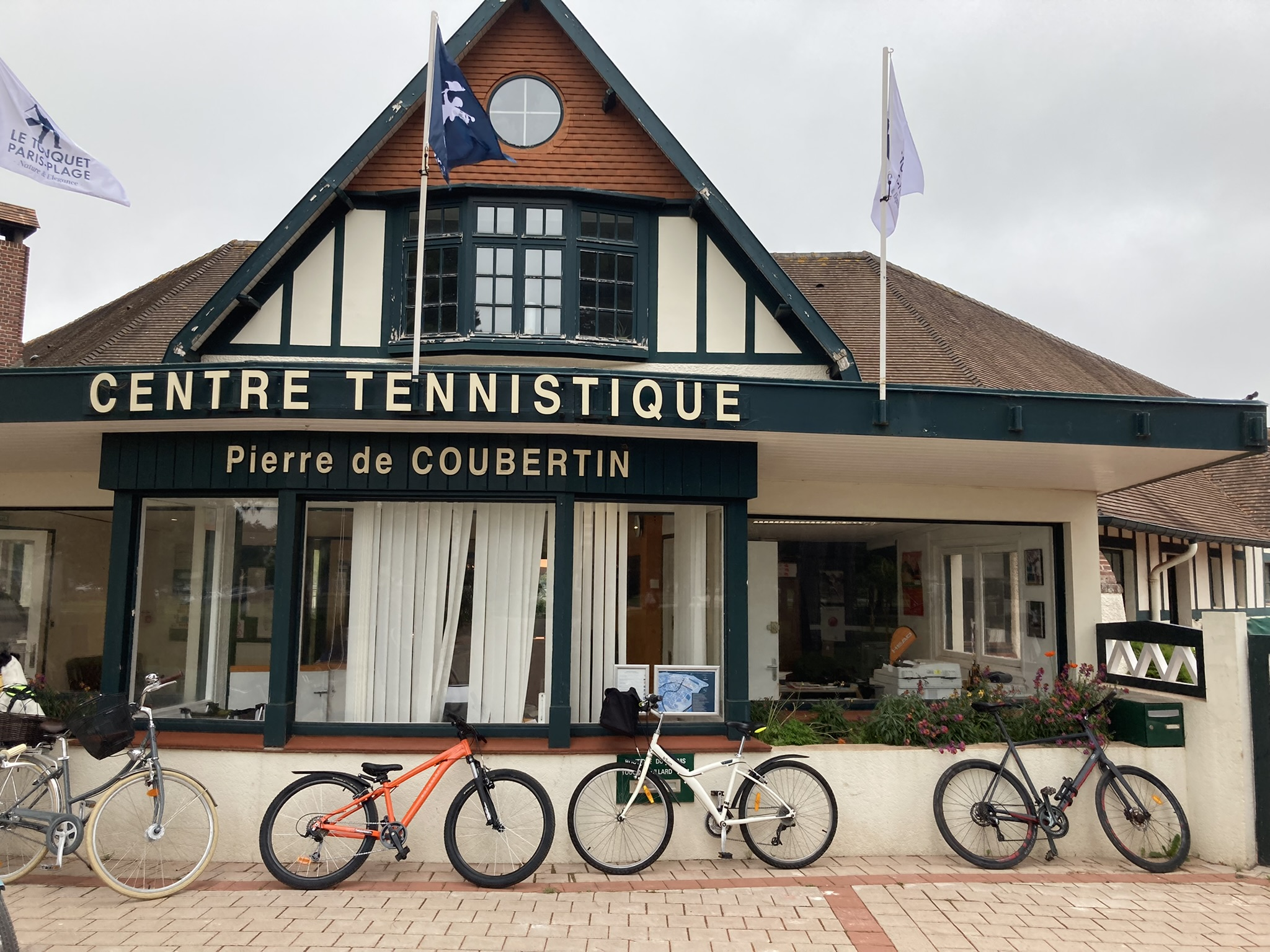
Le Touquet's municipal tennis club

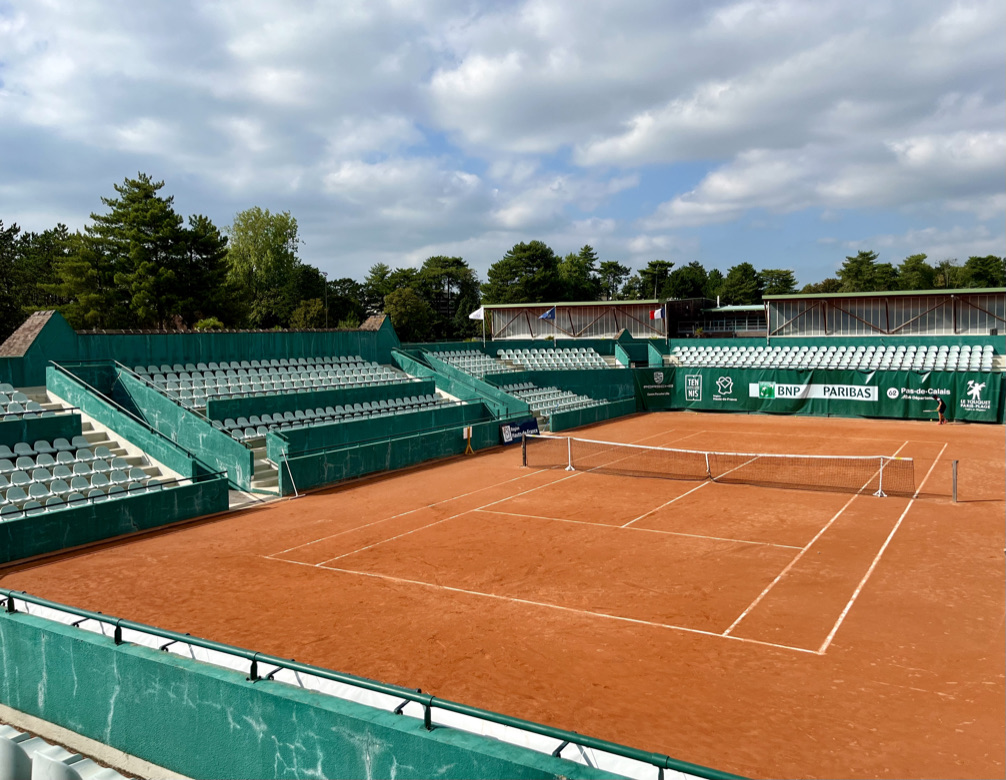
The central clay court

Le Touquet was part of a wider trend in pre-WWI France to create tennis facilities near the sea. Because of the town's specifics as an upscale resort, the sport was first and foremost intended to be a fashionable and leisurely activity for upper-class guests. Indeed, outdoor activities like tennis and golf were so fashionable that in mid-1920s, they inspired a whole new haute couture trend of style sportive. There were even emulations for those who just wanted to look sporty (while also wearing items that would normally interfere with physical activity, such as jewellery or high-heeled shoes).

The Cercle Internationale du Touquet, organised by Stoneham, Coubertin as well as Grand Duke Michael Alexandrovich of Russia and some French aristocrats, contributed greatly to the development of the sport. Thanks to their efforts, by the early 1910s, Le Touquet hosted international tennis championships, which included the 1913 edition, one of the first wins in Suzanne Lenglen's career. The Jean Borotra Cup, part of the Junior Davis Cup competition, is held since 1972 and determines winner nations in the under-16 category.

Starting from three courts in 1904, the tennis complex expanded to 11 courts by 1912 and to 30 courts at the dawn of World War II. A special tennis club building was unveiled in 1923. Today, the tennis complex offers 21 clay courts (including 3 with lights), 5 covered hardcourts, 3 padel courts and a central court for with a tribune for 900 spectators, as well as a swimming pool. The number of courts makes Le Touquet's tennis club the third-largest in the country. It was one of the preparation sites for the 2024 Summer Olympics in Paris, together with nearby field hockey and football premises, where Le Touquet AC plays.

==== Golf ====
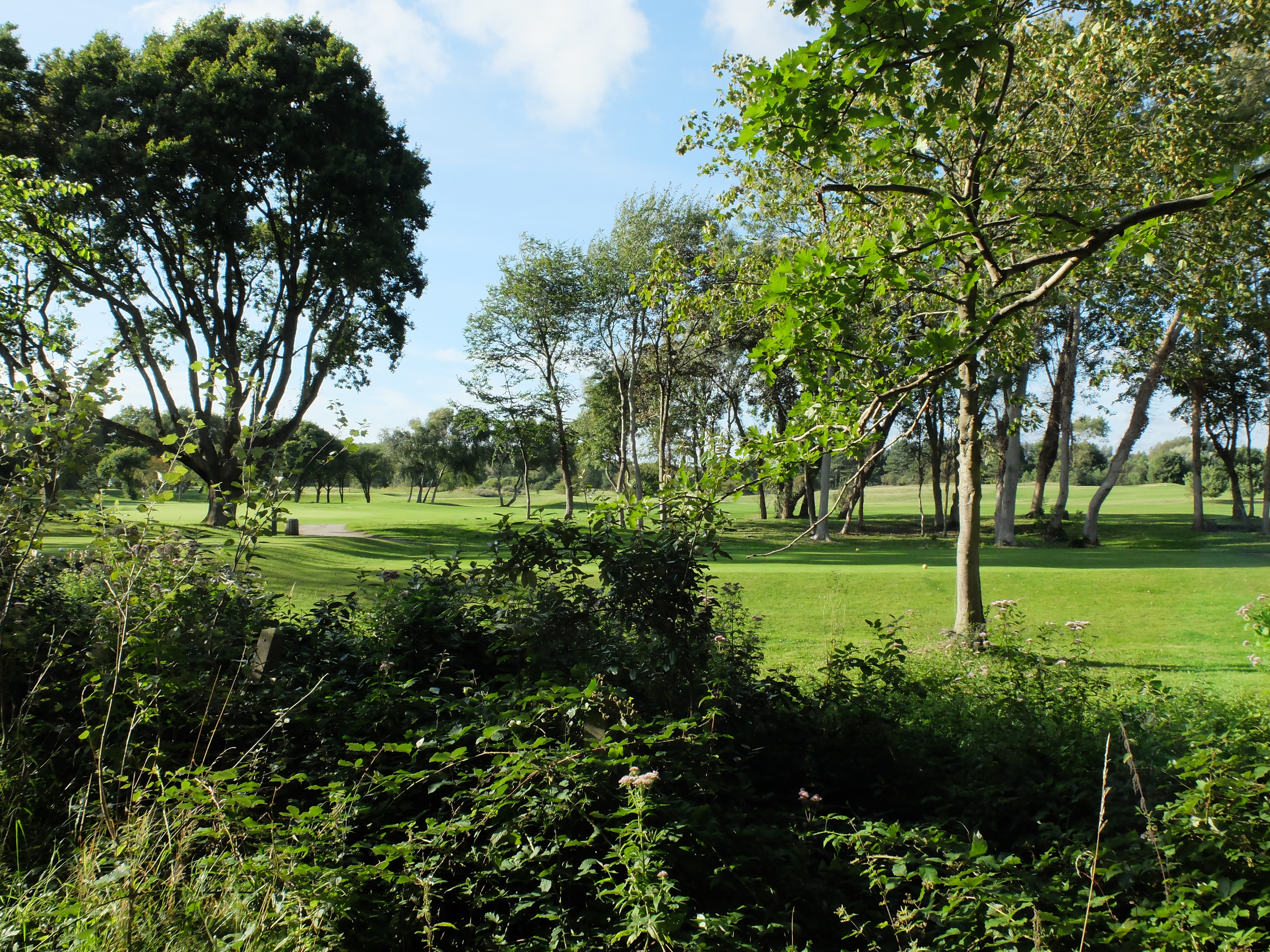
Part of one of Le Touquet's three golf courses

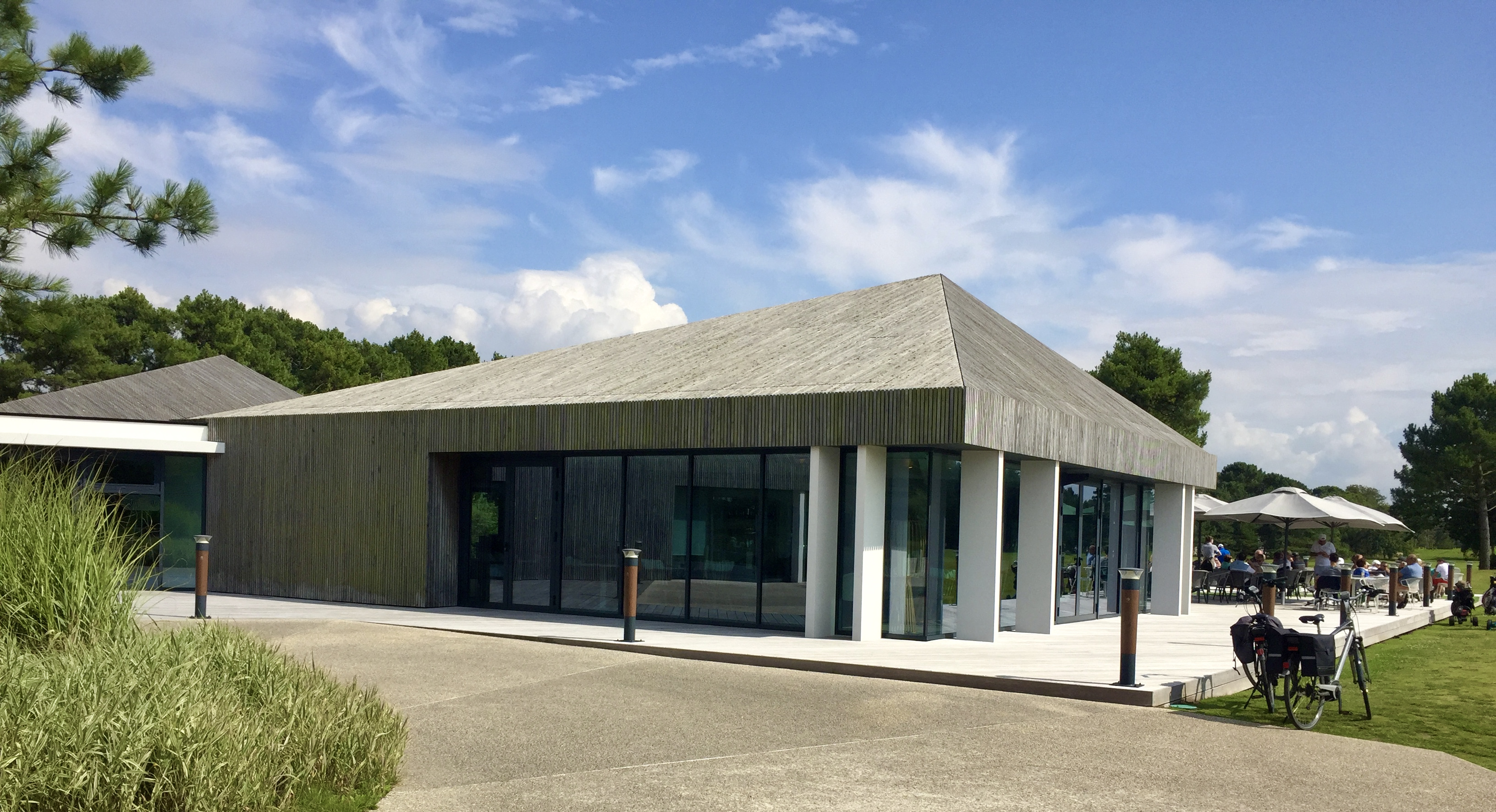
New golf clubhouse in Le Touquet, as photographed in 2016

When Lord Balfour inaugurated the first 18-hole golf course in 1904, Le Touquet's golf development was unique for two reasons: first, most of the golf courses operated in the South of France (Biarritz, Pau, Cannes etc.) and not around or north of Paris; secondly, unlike in the southern golf courses, where individual players promoted the course by word of mouth, the company developing the resort took that job. It also built the Golf Hotel (opened 1908). That golf course proved a success, so many more appeared on the northern coast of France to accommodate increasing demand of English elites. Wimereux, just north of Boulogne, opened its own facilities three years later, and Le Touquet had to expand with a second 9-hole course in 1910.

The premises grew to the current size of 45 holes by 1931. These are: two 18-hole courses, La Forêt (the oldest one; par 71, SSS 71, 5,827 m (6,372 yd)) and La Mer (built in 1931 in the sand dunes; par 72, SSS 75.5, 6,407 m (7,007 yd)), and a 9-hole course called Le Manoir (par 35, SSS 35, 2,817 m (3,081 yd)). The La Mer course is fairly well-regarded among golf players: in one assessment of the best courses in Continental Europe, this course was 59th and 12th in France. In 1992, the Bell family, who purchased the golf courses from Touquet Syndicate Ltd., sold them to the "Open Golf Club", a company with French owners.

==== Horse racing ====
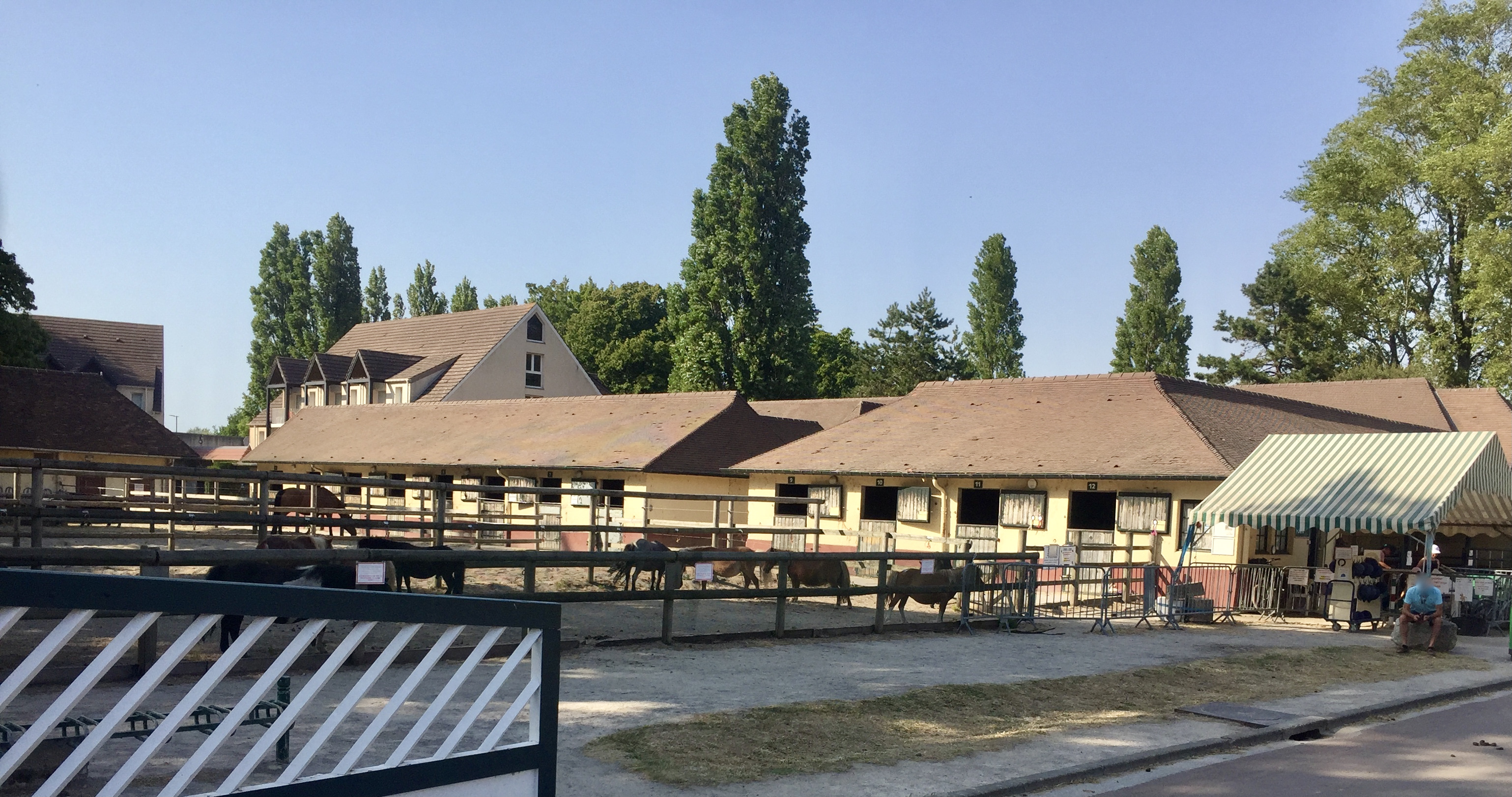
Le Touquet's equestrian facility near the racecourse

The English developers who bought the resort's land were enthusiasts of horse racing and betting, and knowing that these sports were also the domain of the high society whose tastes they were catering to, they put much effort into its development. The Cercle Internationale du Touquet, composed of aristocrats, happily assisted in these efforts. First competitions were already held in 1904 on a communal pasture called Nœud Vincent, next to the tennis courts, followed by the first international tournament (for both men and women) the following year. Until 1925, this place would serve as a makeshift racecourse for sports like steeplechase and polo. Even when the permanent location in an "Anglo-Norman" style was opened and before the outbreak of WWII, Englishmen participated in a sport called "drags", i.e. riding a horse with a pack of hounds as if they were going hunting.

In 1971, Le Touquet and its partners built an equestrian centre, which was expanded in the 2000s to create a €2.4 million equestrian park that combined the centre, show jumping courses and the 1925 racecourse into one, and further enhanced in 2011 with 300 permanent and 450 temporary horseboxes. Le Touquet was the back base for the French equestrian team at the 2012 Summer Olympics in London, and was also one of the training bases for the 2024 Summer Olympics in Paris. The Le Touquet horse racecourse is among the most important in the region of Hauts-de-France and is among the few in France that is listed on the national heritage list.

==== Water and beach sports ====
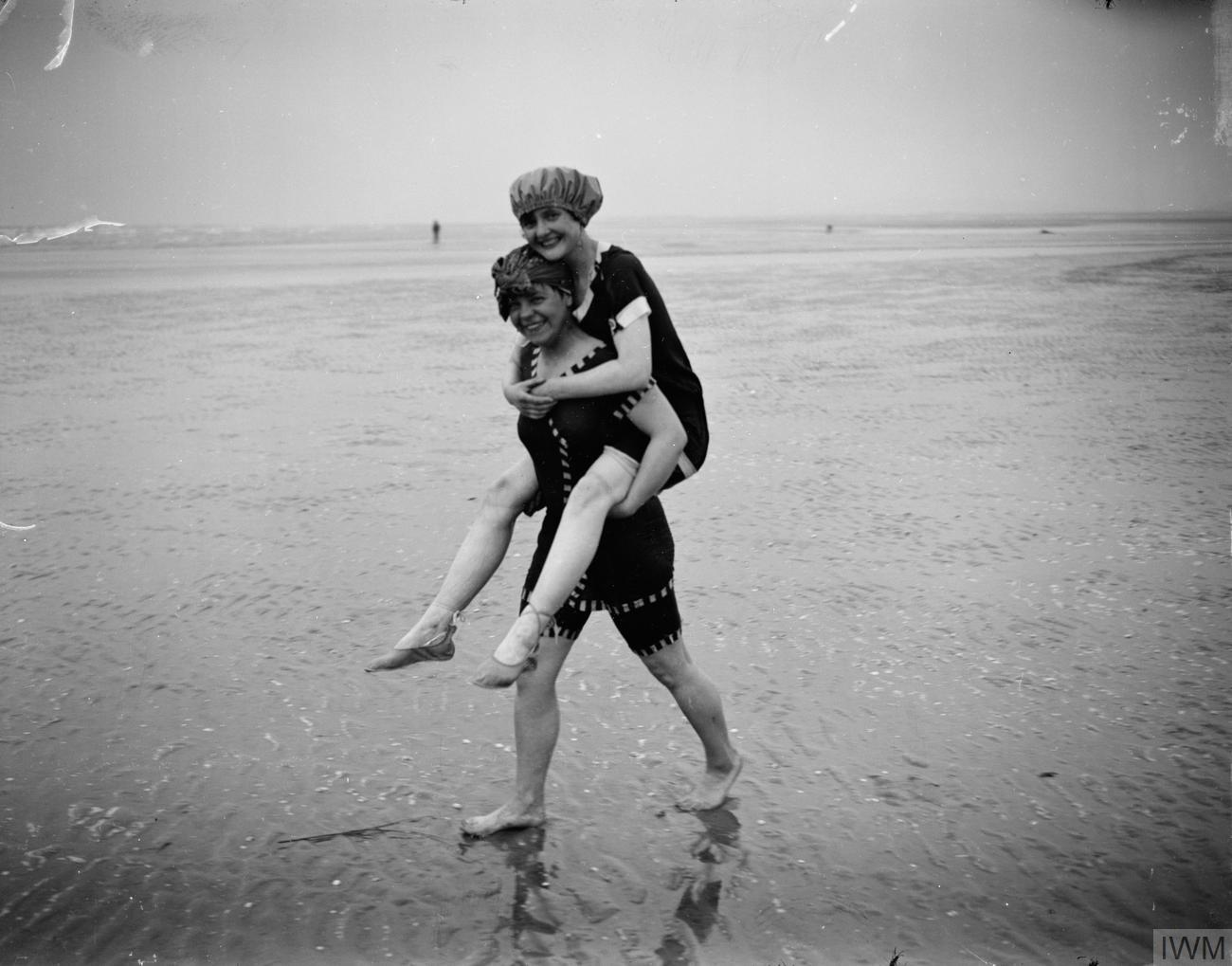
Members of the Queen Mary's Army Auxiliary Corps enjoying the beach at Le Touquet, 1918

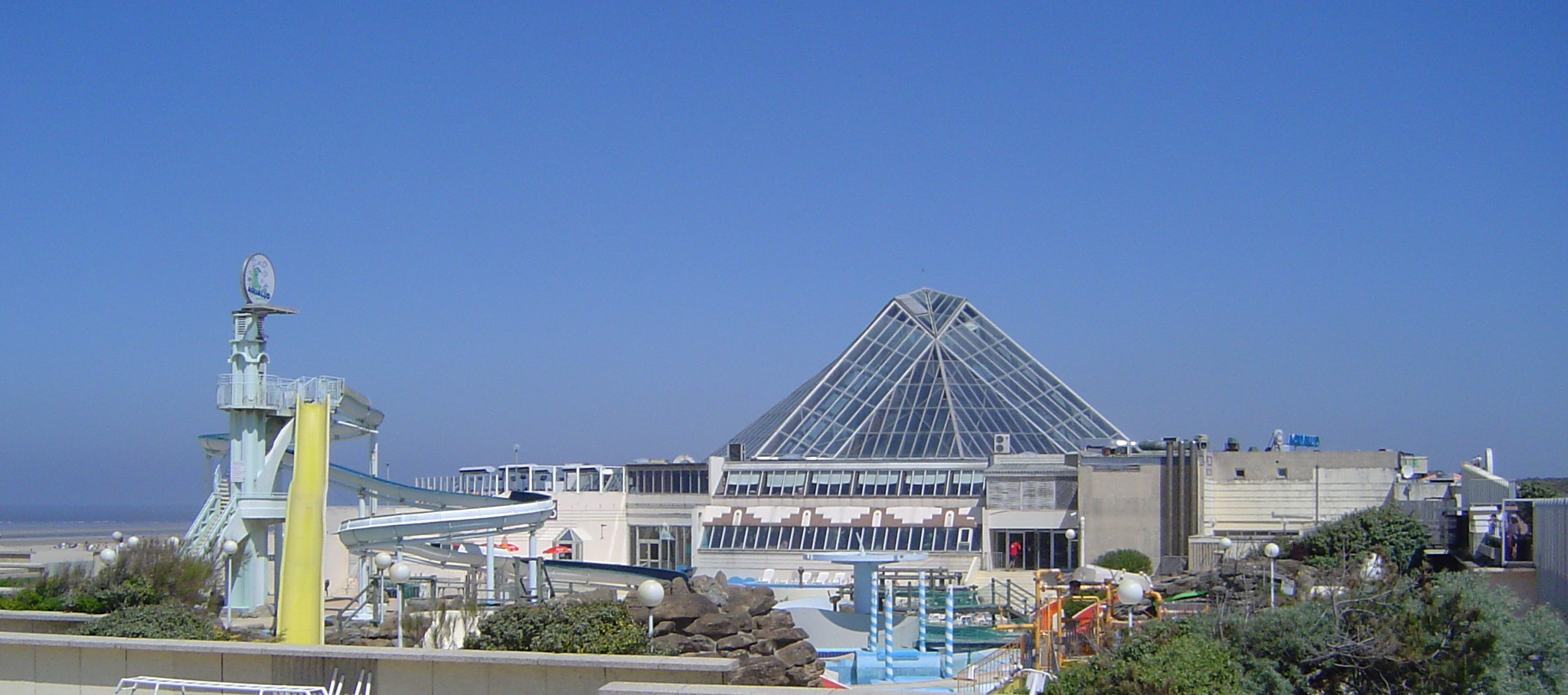
Aqualud, a former water park (photo from 2010) opened in the place of the swimming pool. Note the tower to the left side of the image

Despite Le Touquet being a seaside resort, at first sea activities ran somewhat in the background in relation to other sports. For the upper-class clientele, sea baths alone were not enough as they were taken for granted, so resorts competed with each other by providing a wide choice of other leisure or entertainment opportunities. Still, many events happened on the beach as well. A beach club was opened in 1927, but just like elsewhere in pre-war France, the main goal was not as much participation in sports as its members' health. A swimming pool (1931), 66 m (217 ft) long and 25 m (82 ft) wide with depth varying from 60 cm (2.0 ft) to 5 m (16 ft), could accommodate up to 3,500 guests on its tribunes and included such features as four diving trampolines up to 10 m (33 ft) above the ground, purified seawater heated to 30 °C (86 °F), more than 500 cabins with footbaths, a massaging hot tub, a beauty salon, a laundry service, a restaurant, a café, a teahouse and a leisure room as well as a beach games room and a large parking lot. The pool was badly damaged during World War II, but was restored to service in 1950 and stayed in the pre-war configuration until 1985, when rising maintenance costs prompted the commune to convert the area to a water park.

Aqualud, as it was known, included six water slides, a jacuzzi and a wave pool, and it attracted over 100,000 visitors per year. The water park closed in 2019 for maintenance and never reopened after the COVID-19 pandemic struck. The abandoned site was a popular target for urban explorers before the commune hired security guards to deter trespassers. A luxury hotel complex, "The Dune", is supposed to take its place, but as of November 2025, its building permit is held up by numerous court challenges.

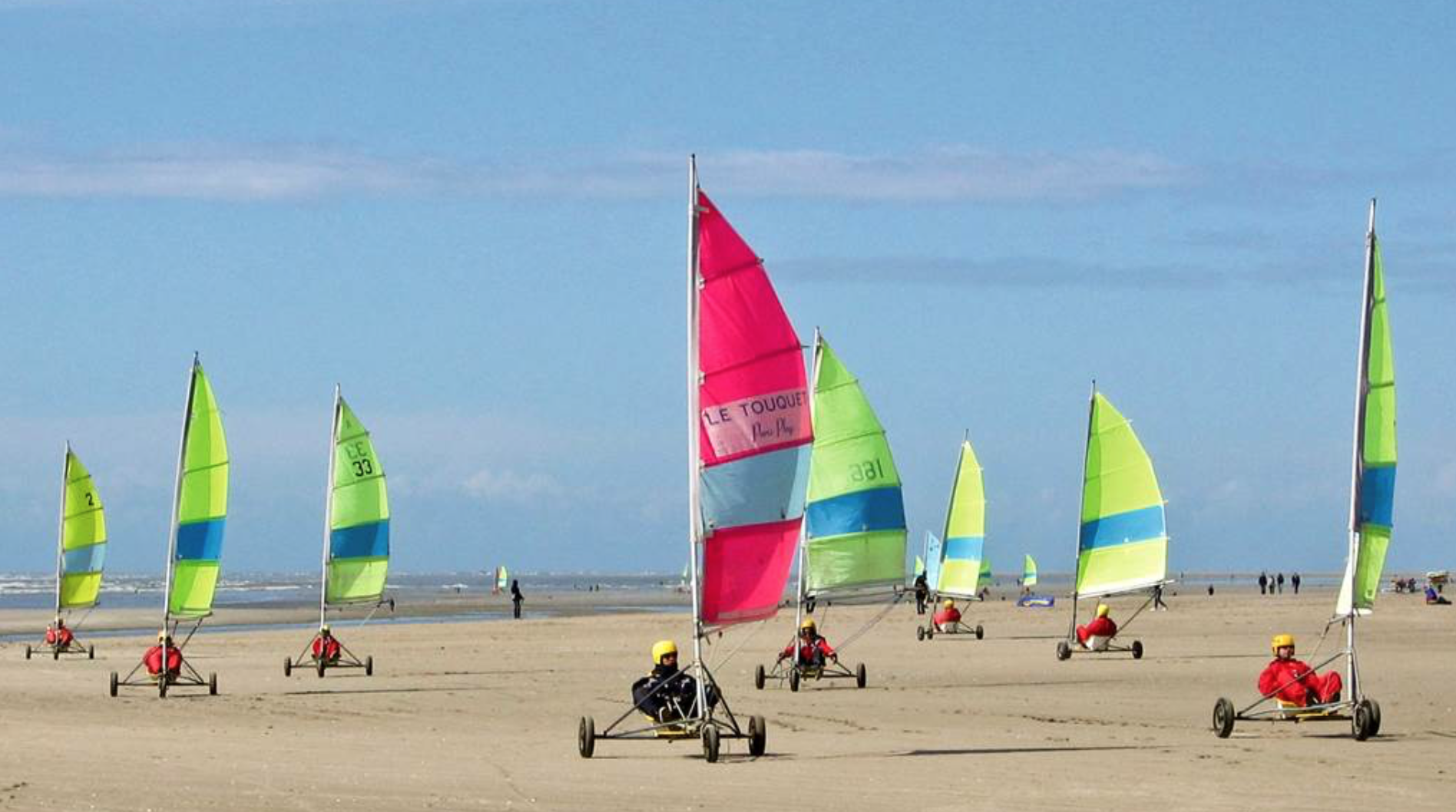
Land sailors on the beach of Le Touquet

In the post-war years, Le Touquet became particularly well-known thanks to land sailing. Le Touquet's beach is well-suited for this kind of sport, as it is very long, straight and is not interrupted by any sort of obstacle. Henri Demoury, originally a miller in the Aisne, moved to Le Touquet after World War II, opened a workshop for land yachts and, in 1956, launched the first land sailing club in France (Blériot Club, named after the inventor who popularised the sport in Le Touquet's general area), which in 2018 counted 180 members and had 130 land yachts. Its longtime director (1995–2013) was Bertrand Lambert, who set the record for the highest speed on land sails while driving on sand (151.55 km/h (94.17 mph) in Berck), was a three-time world champion in the discipline and served as president of the French Land Sailing Federation (FFCV) for seven years. Le Touquet held three international competitions in land sailing: the 3rd edition of the European Land Yachting Championship in 1965 and, in 2006, the 43rd European Championship and 10th World Championship (co-hosted with the town of Gravelines).

Since about 1955, beach volleyball became an important activity on the beaches of Northern France, and the local club frequently participated in tournaments with rivals from other seaside resorts. Since 2010, the local beach volleyball club holds games for the Série A, the highest national tournament in France in the discipline, and in 2019 it hosted the national cup. It was one of 16 preparation bases in France for the 2024 Olympics.

==== Cycling ====
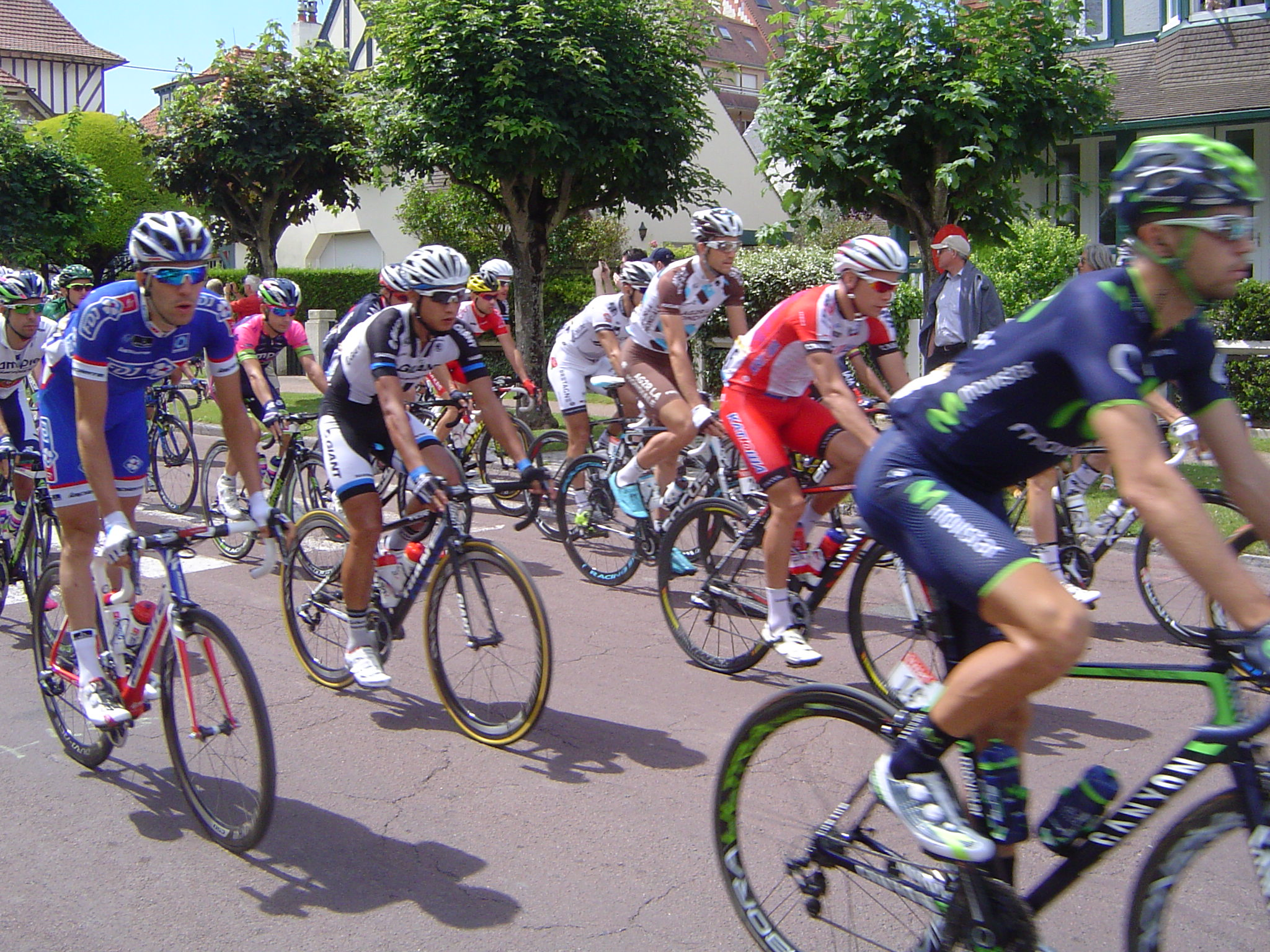
Tour de France race on 8 July 2014

Le Touquet has been host to four stages of the Tour de France: the finish point of stage 6b of 1971 Tour de France; two stages at the 1976 Tour de France, an individual time trial (stage 3) and the departure point for stage 4; and the 2014 Tour de France stage 4. Le Touquet is thus eligible to promote itself with a "Bicycle City" (Ville à Vélo) label by Tour de France (one of 133 municipalities in the world). The jury found in 2021 and 2023 that the commune had a structured policy of promoting bicycle usage, awarding it with two bicycles out of four. According to another assessment, the Baromètre des villes cyclables, a national survey of bicycle usage and safety, Le Touquet's grade in 2021 on the scale from 1 to 6 (higher is better; averaged to 3.50) was 4.22 ("favourable conditions"), the third-best result in the Hauts-de-France region among 115 rated communes.

=== Cuisine ===
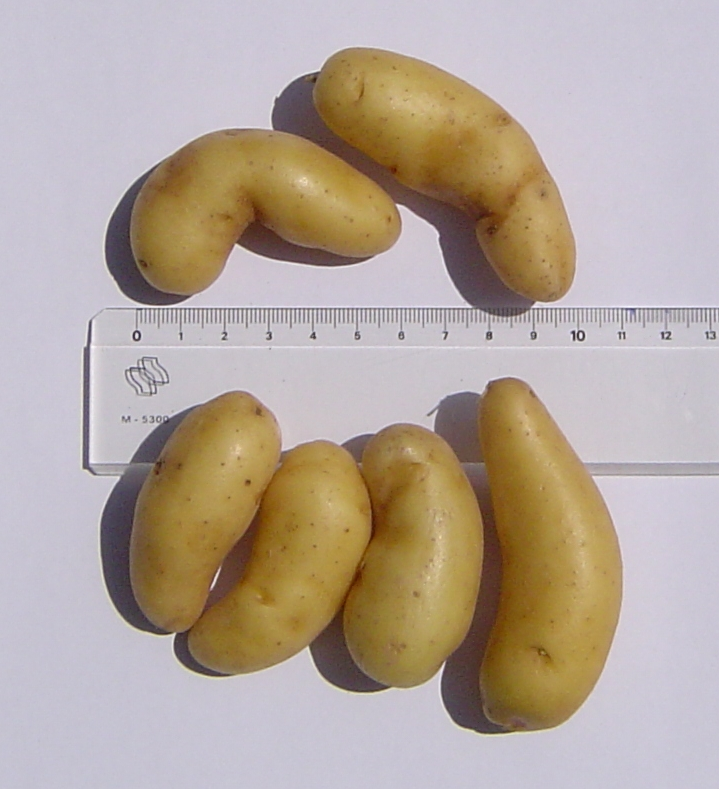
Rattes du Touquet

Le Touquet has some distinctive local cuisine specialties. One is the ratte du Touquet, a local type of ratte potatoes which are named after the town because André Hennuyer, a gardener from Le Touquet, helped revive the cultivation of that variety in the 1960s (the variety was trademarked in 1986). While farmers largely abandoned it due to low yields and poor disease resistance, this variety is prized for its characteristic nutty flavour (for that reason they notably featured in Joël Robuchon's puréed potatoes recipe).

Another local dish is a fish soup prepared by Serge Pérard. Pérard says that during German occupation, he bought some leftovers from a fish market in Boulogne and prepared a crude soup out of them, and then used some of the initial broth for refinement with herbs and onions and repeated the cycle until he was confident that his final version, with sea molluscs and saffron, would be popular. Based on his new recipe, he opened the first seafood restaurant in Le Touquet in 1963. The dish proved so popular that by 1970, Pérard was bottling 3,000 soup jars per day, and had to open a new purpose-built production facility in 1991 to cater to growing demand.

An invention relatively well-known in the area comes from a chocolatier called Au Chat Bleu, which expanded from Le Touquet to four locations across France. The restaurant's specialty is the "chat bleu", a praline mousse sandwiched between two layers of nougatine.

=== Cultural institutions ===
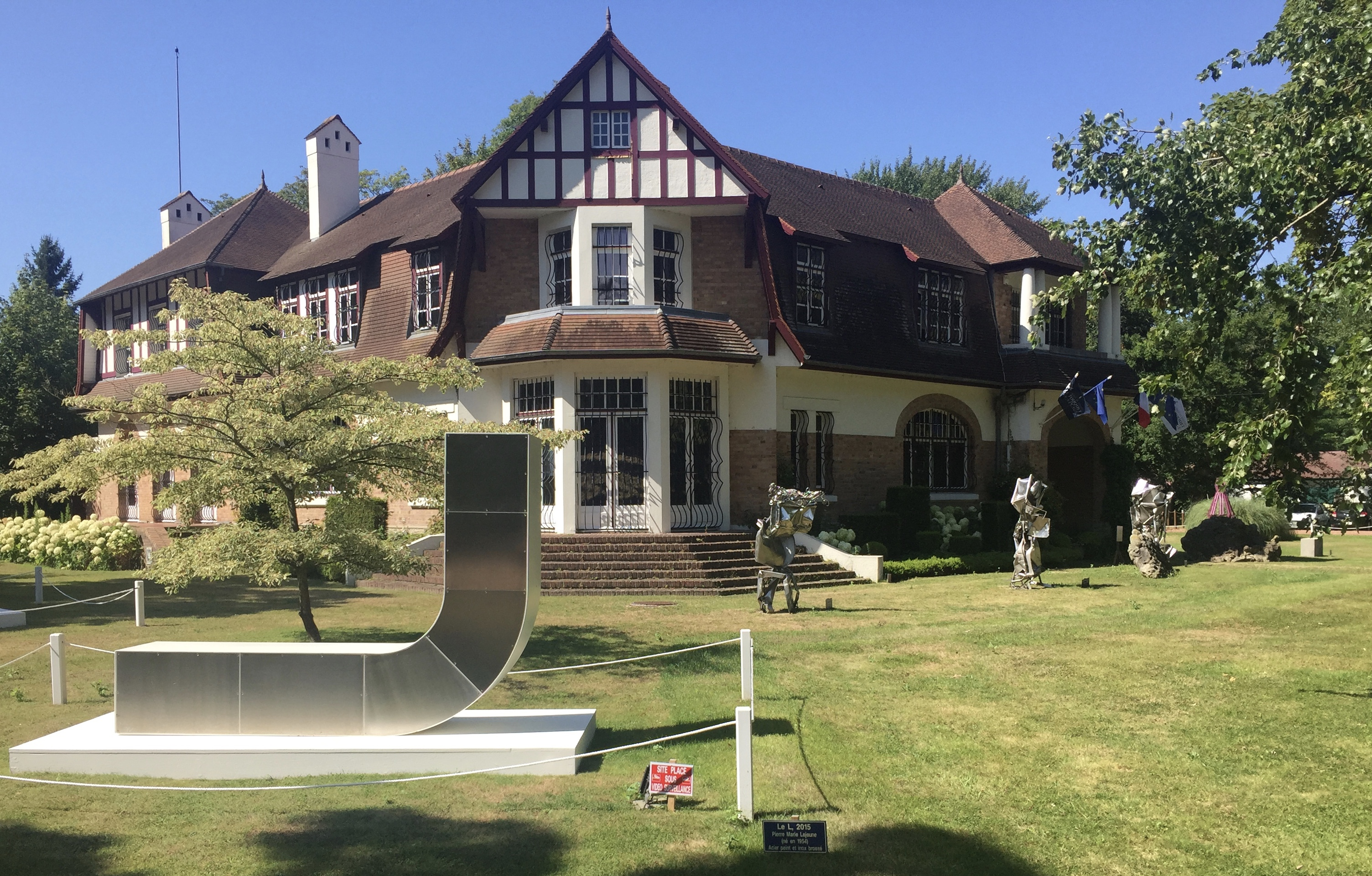
Museum of Le Touquet

Despite its small size, Le Touquet has several cultural institutions. Among the oldest is the Société académique du Touquet-Paris-Plage, which since 1906 collects and stores objects of historical interest concerning the city. The city museum, Musée du Touquet-Paris-Plage, opened in 1932 on the initiative of the historical society. Due to World War II, it closed its doors from 1939 to 1963, when its collections were retrieved from hiding. The museum was also renamed for Édouard Champion, its first curator. In 1989, the institution moved to a larger space, Villa Wayside, where it is located today. The museum is primarily an art gallery specialising in paintings coming from artists who lived in the pre-WWI Étaples art colony, but it also houses collections from regional artists and those who were part of the School of Paris. The Ministry of Culture awarded the museum the label of "Musée de France".

The commune also has a public library, with 35,000 titles and 1,600 CDs and DVDs available. As of August 2022, it had about 1,600 users. In the interwar period, there were as many as five cinemas in Le Touquet, but only one exists today: Les 3 As, with five auditoriums. One of the other cinemas (Select), with one 400-seat auditorium, was converted to Casino Partouche and a nightclub.

==== Religion ====
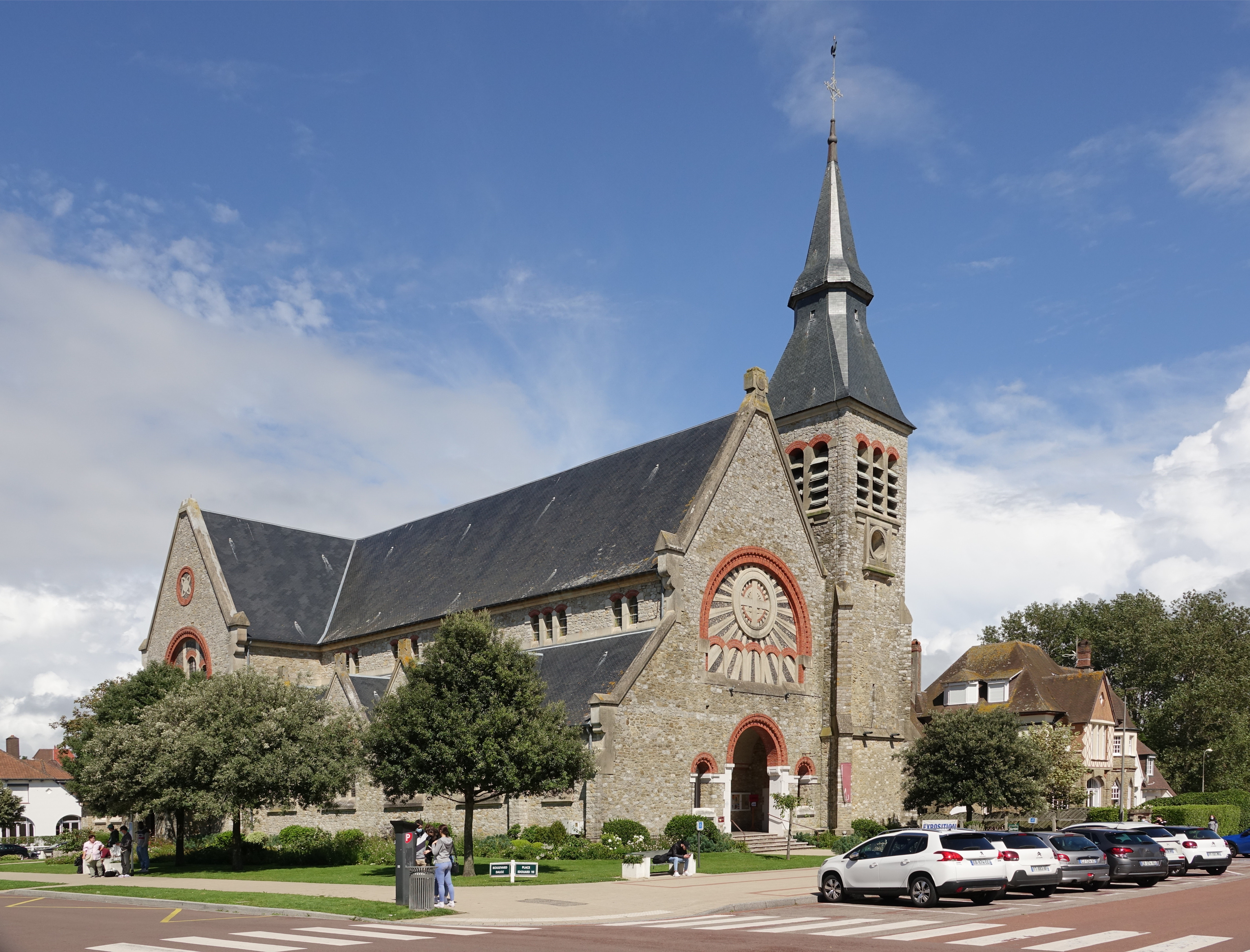
Saint Joan of Arc church in Le Touquet

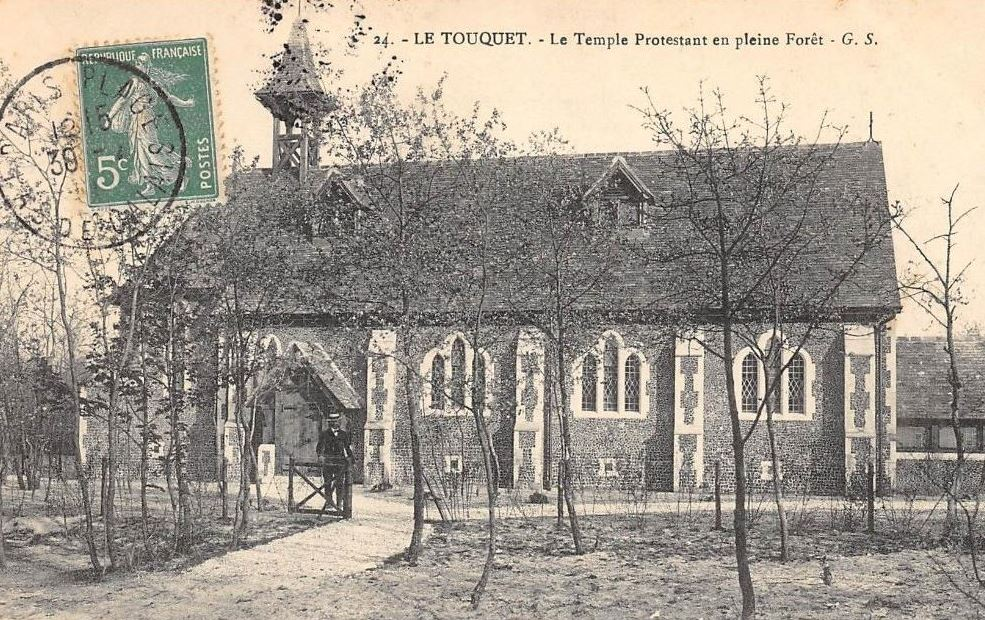
A pre-war Protestant temple

The first place of worship was a small Catholic chapel built in 1886, four years after the foundation of the beach resort. It had to be expanded several times due to the influx of new parishioners, but this was not enough to deal with overcrowding during Mass. This is why a bigger church was inaugurated in 1911 in its place. It became the first church in France to carry the name of Joan of Arc, which happened 11 years before her canonisation. The building was ruined from the bombardments of June 1944. It was rebuilt after World War II, opening its doors in either 1947 or 1950. In 2023, Storm Ciarán dealt heavy damage to the bell tower, which as of November 2025 is being repaired.

Le Touquet is the seat of the Holy Family of the Opal Land parish, which serves the town as well as neighbouring beach resorts. The church is supervised by the diocese of Arras. However, the building itself belongs to the commune.

==== Festivals ====
Le Touquet hosts numerous events, particularly in the summer period.

- There are several artistic festivals. Since 2022, the Winter Jazz Festival is held in the congress hall in February. The "Piano folies" classical music event started in May 2009, but as of 2025, it is held in August. In July, there is a bi-annual solidarity festival for people with autism called "Touquether". In the second half of August, the town has a meet-up of DJs and, separately, the Touquet Music Beach Festival, an electronic music event. The "2K Festival" is dedicated to African and Latin dances.
- A crime novel festival takes place in July. A book fair is held in mid-November as a continuation of the flea market of antiques and jewellery, which happens on All Saints' Day (1 November).
- A parade of antique and rare cars is scheduled on every third Sunday of the month from April until November.
- A "wine for the women" (vin au féminin) degustation session takes place in February. In July, Le Touquet's streets witness a waiters' race.

== Infrastructure ==
=== Education ===
The first school in Le Touquet was opened in 1888, which was managed privately by a Mr. Delacroix and was not free; children from poor families had to walk to Cucq to attend class in a communal school, which most did not. In 1893, the Daloz family granted a free parcel of land for the commune to build a school there; first classes, for 37 students, started in 1897. By 1905, residents petitioned the commune to split the coeducational school into one for boys and the other for girls, so the commune opened a boys-only school in 1908 (today the Antoine de Saint-Exupéry elementary school), and changed the first communal school into that for girls. By 1910, the two schools already had 110 children aged two to five; in response, the commune inaugurated a kindergarten that first opened its doors in 1912. All three facilities used a common canteen, which was rebuilt in 1978 to house six more classes. There were also two private schools, one for girls in the villa Ave Maria, which opened in 1915, and the other opened by the Catholic parish in 1922. Its existence was interrupted by the death of the abbot in 1947 and so it only reopened in 1955. As of 2024, Le Touquet has two primary schools: (Note: In France, the term "primary school" (école primaire) includes both the école maternelle (kindergarten) and école élémentaire, which would be known as "primary school" in many Commonwealth varieties of English) the communal establishment teaches 210 pupils, while a private Catholic one enrols 177 students; both offer kindergarten classes.

Le Touquet's schools

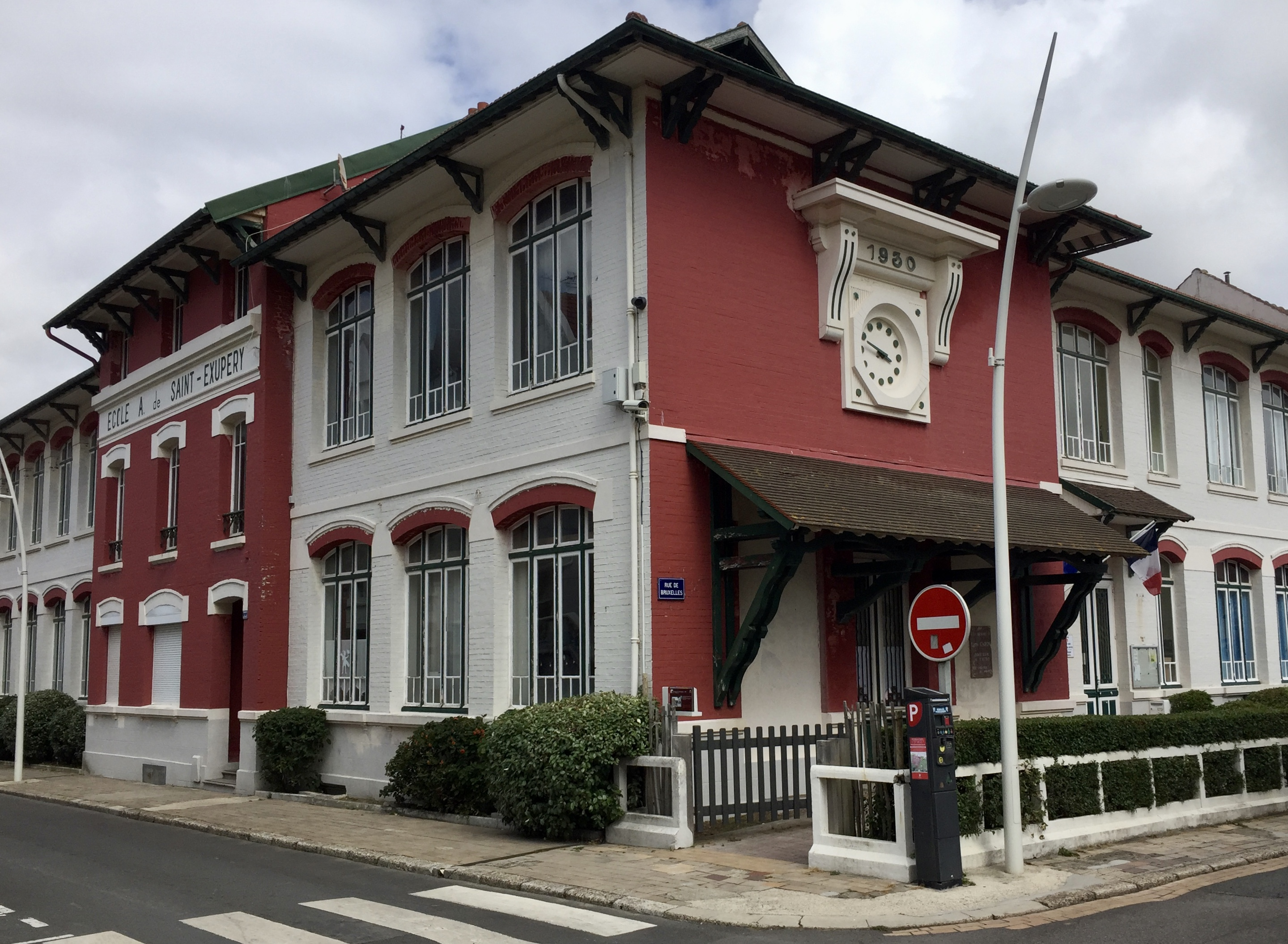
Antoine de Saint-Exupéry elementary school (1908, expanded 1930)

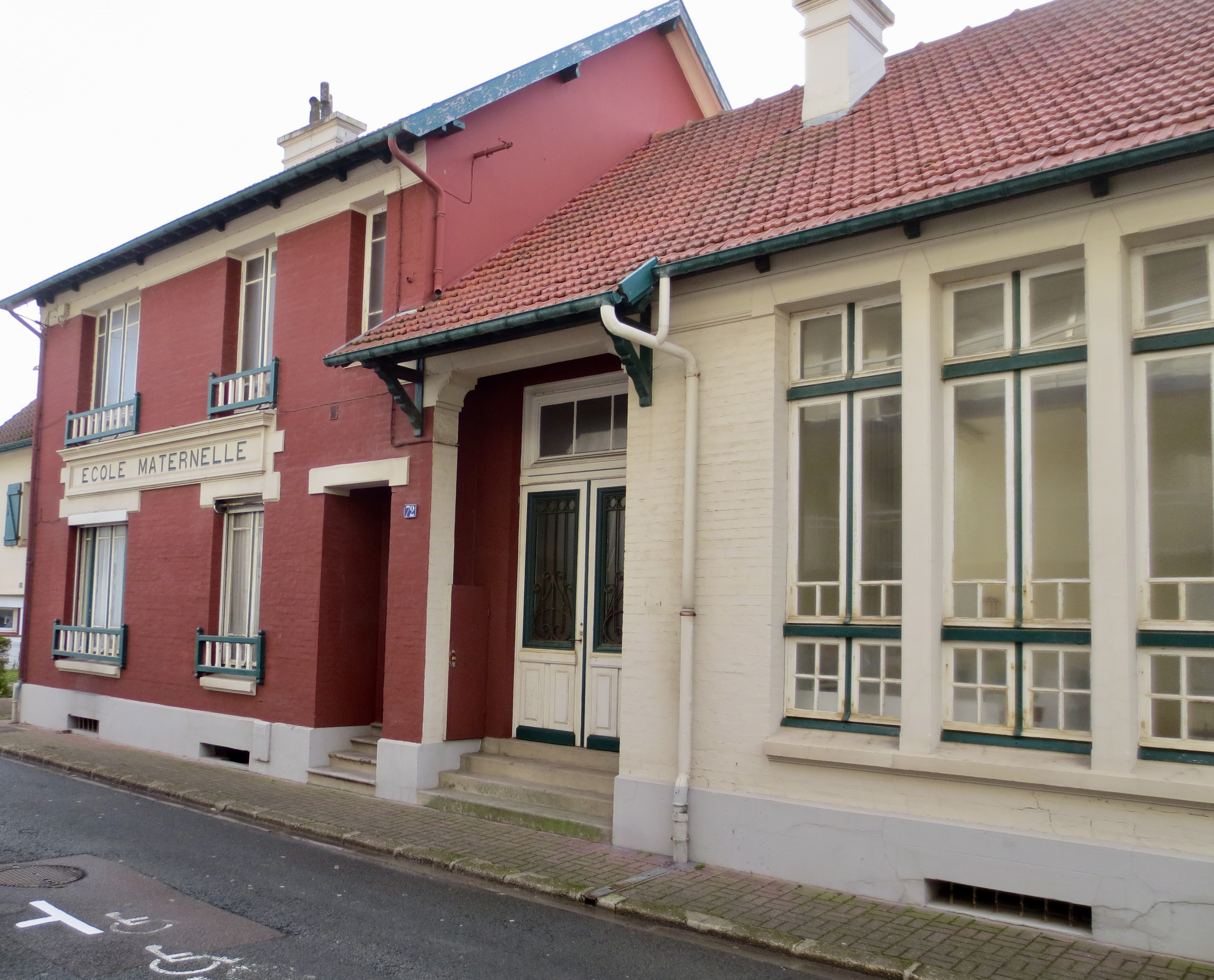
Another view of the elementary school

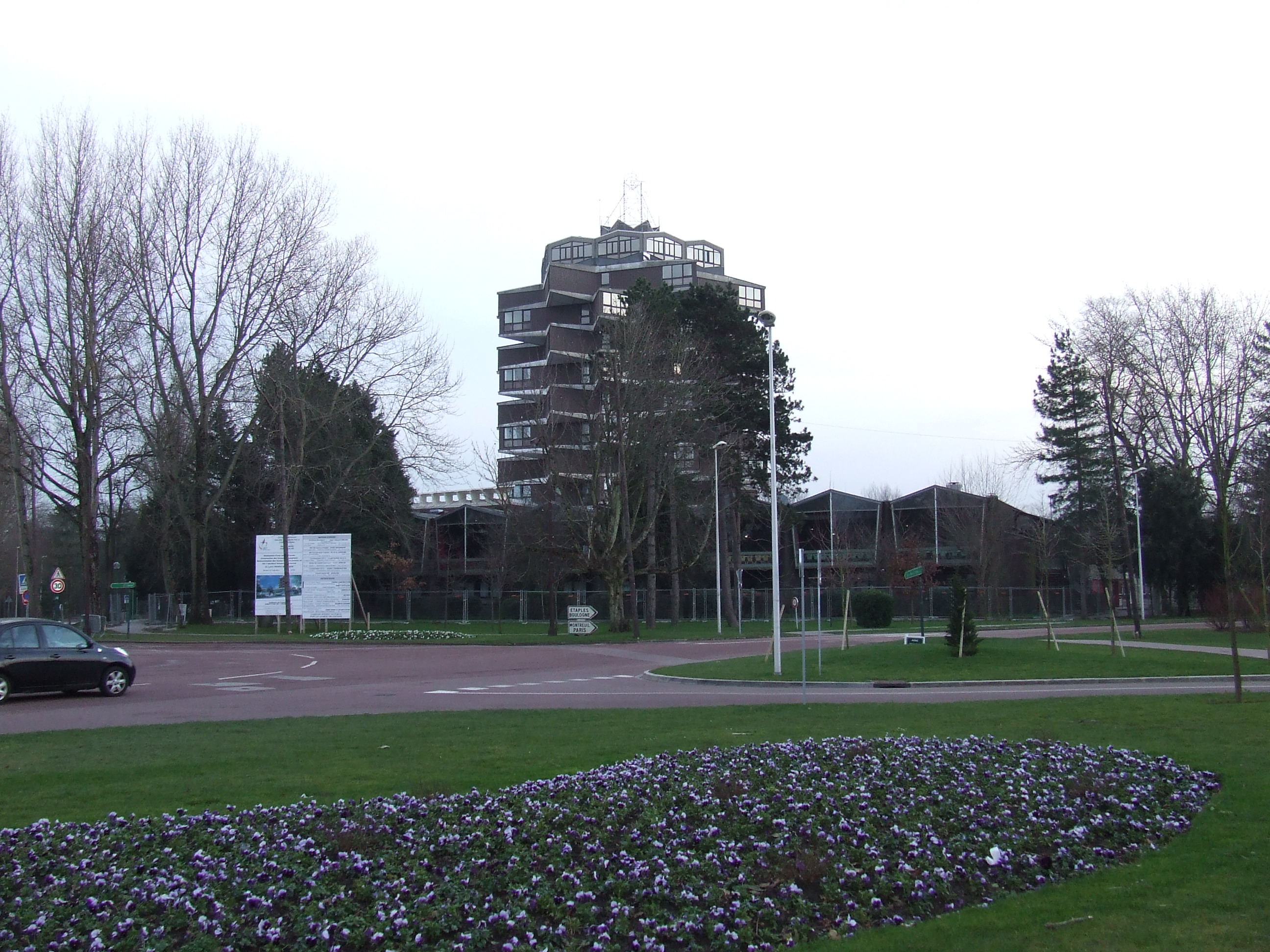
Le Touquet's hospitality trade school (1972)

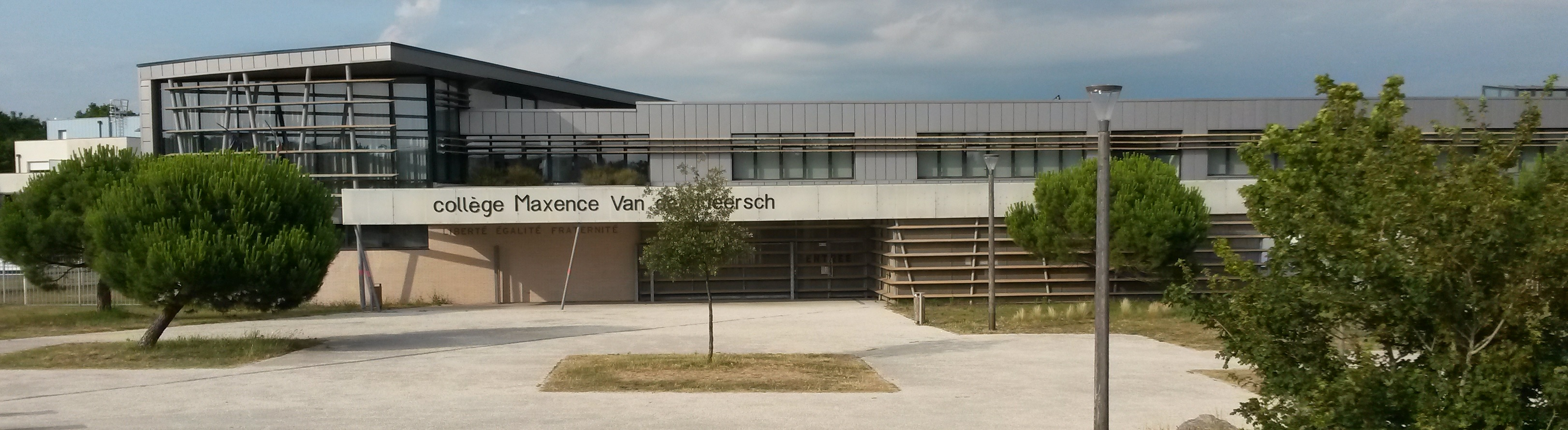
Collège Maxence Van der Meersch, Le Touquet's (lower) secondary school

In 1972, construction finished at the so-called education campus (cité éducative) where the Royal Picardy hotel had previously stood. It hosted the brand-new hospitality trade school (lycée hôtelier) and the lower secondary school (collège), The trade school, managed by the region of Hauts-de-France, got several improvements in the 2000s, including six model guest rooms from two to four stars and a new kitchen practice. The trade school also has boarding rooms and possibility to pursue post-secondary studies in the hospitality field. In 2024, 232 admission requests were submitted for 72 places for first-year students. The cone-shaped premises are protected as an architectural monument since 2004.

The department manages the Collège Maxence Van der Meersch, which moved out of the trade school to a new dedicated building near the airport in 2007. All of Le Touquet's schools are under the administrative supervision of the academy of Lille, which covers the Nord and the Pas-de-Calais departments.

=== Transport ===
==== Rail ====
Historically, Le Touquet had very good rail service thanks to local rail lines that served the coast between the Canche and the Authie and a connector to the main railway line. The trunk line between Paris and Boulogne, with the station at nearby Étaples, was opened in 1847. As Le Touquet rapidly expanded, some investors started sensing a business opportunity in carrying passengers to the new resort. The first request for a railway concession came in 1892 to build a "tramway", (Note: In late 19th century usage, the word "tramway" in France could mean trams in a modern sense (urban rail transit on public streets) but it was also used for branch lines of local importance. The word "tramway" here refers to the latter meaning.) but that investor backed out due to numerous issues with the construction he could not resolve. On the second try, investors from the Société du Tramway d'Étaples à Paris-Plage (EP) quickly overcame these problems and opened a metre-gauge electrified train line on 15 July 1900. Another concessionary, Société du Chemin de Fer de Berck-Plage à Paris-Plage (BP), followed suit with a non-electrified metre-gauge line that reached the outskirts of Le Touquet in 1910 and the city centre in 1912. There were also two 600 mm gauge tram lines, one being a circular line in the city centre and the other that was only transporting passengers at the golf course; both were built by the developers of Le Touquet and opened around 1910, but in a murky legal environment that does not allow much study of their history.

The BP line, isolated from the rest of the network, had many problems during its existence: during WWI, the French Army commandeered the railway line and ordered its disassembly for military needs; when reassembled, the line was only used seasonally and was losing money. In the mid-1920s, rival companies launched bus connections to Merlimont and Stella-Plage, sealing its fate. The line was closed in September 1927, and in 1929 disappeared from official registers. The tram lines closed in 1925. EP, on the other hand, was doing fairly well. At the beginning, the tram made 12 to 18 daily connections between Étaples and Le Touquet, but by the 1920s there were up to 32 services, which at times allowed a once-per-half-an-hour train schedule. As World War II was approaching, the tram connection was gradually being replaced by buses during off-peak hours, but it was the German invasion of France that finished the railway, as repairing the damages the war brought was not economically viable. In the post-war years, the SNCF built a spur line to the airport to allow passengers travelling from London to Paris a seamless change from an airplane to the train using the Silver Arrow route, but that line was abandoned in 1980 when the connection was no longer profitable.

There are no longer any railway lines within the boundaries of Le Touquet; the closest station is in Étaples. It is mostly served by regional trains to Calais, Amiens and Arras (TER Hauts-de-France), but there are some TGV connections to Paris via Calais-Fréthun and Lille-Europe.

Le Touquet's rail transport

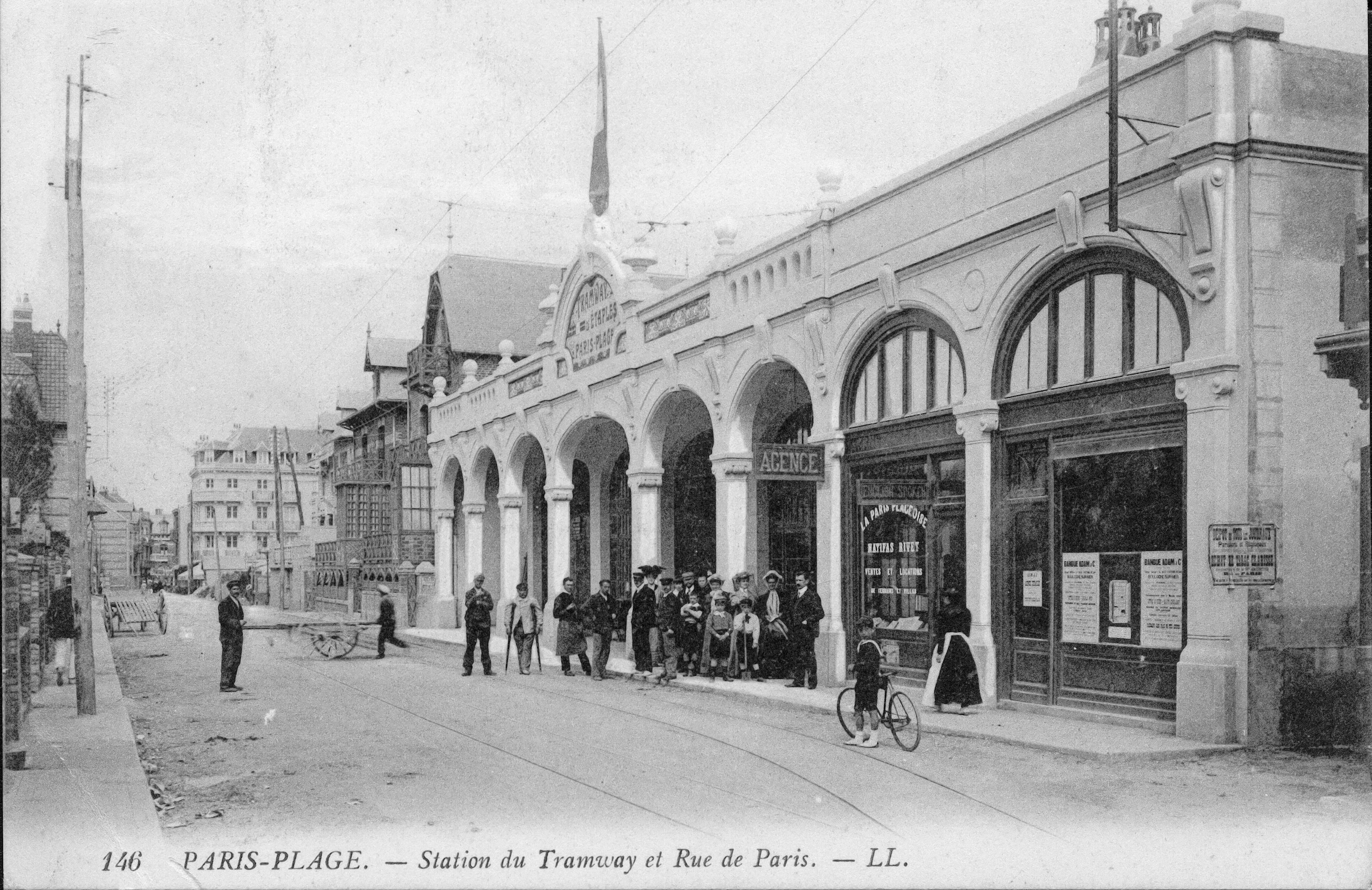
Terminus in Le Touquet (1905). The building no longer exists

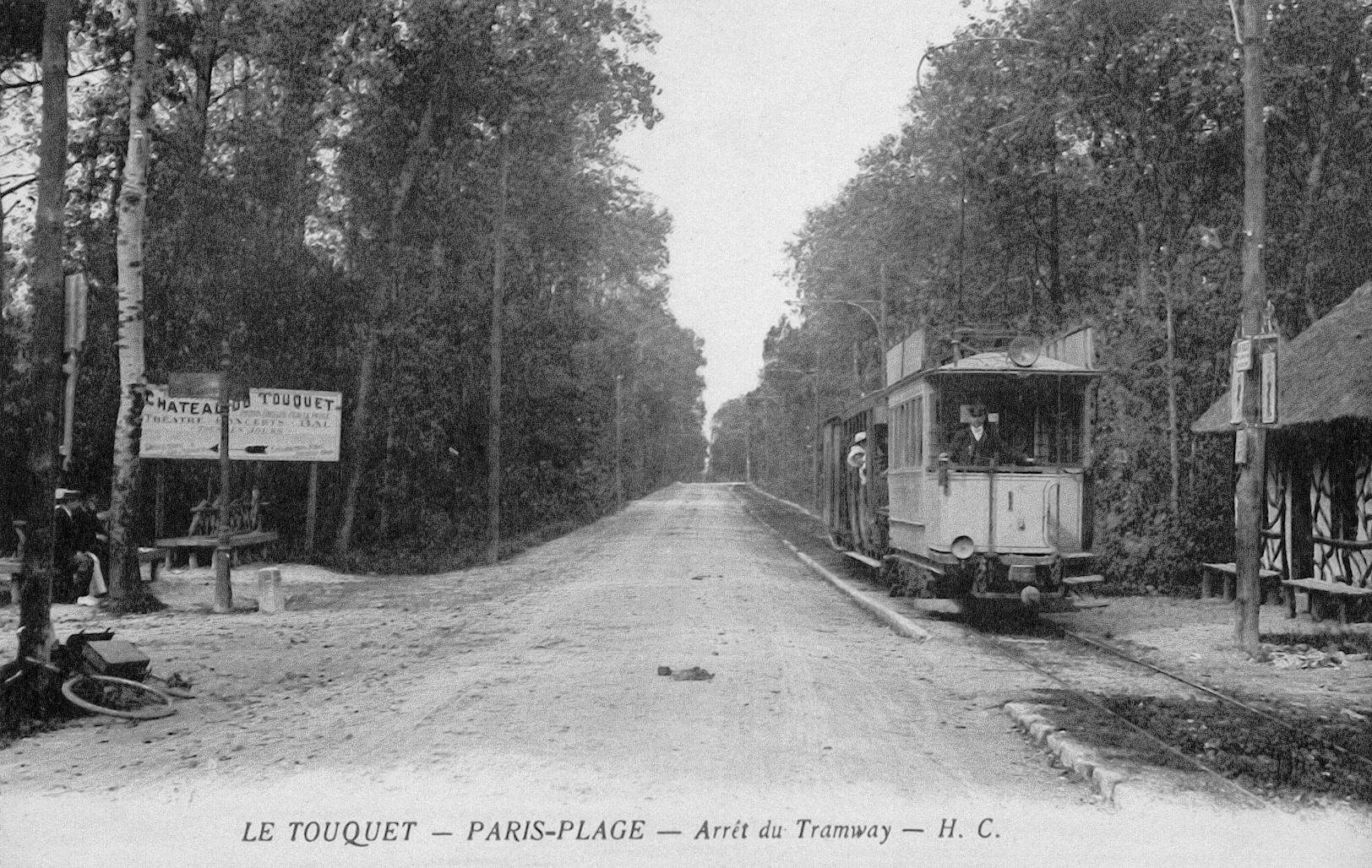
Château train stop (Étaples-Paris-Plage train line), 1900s

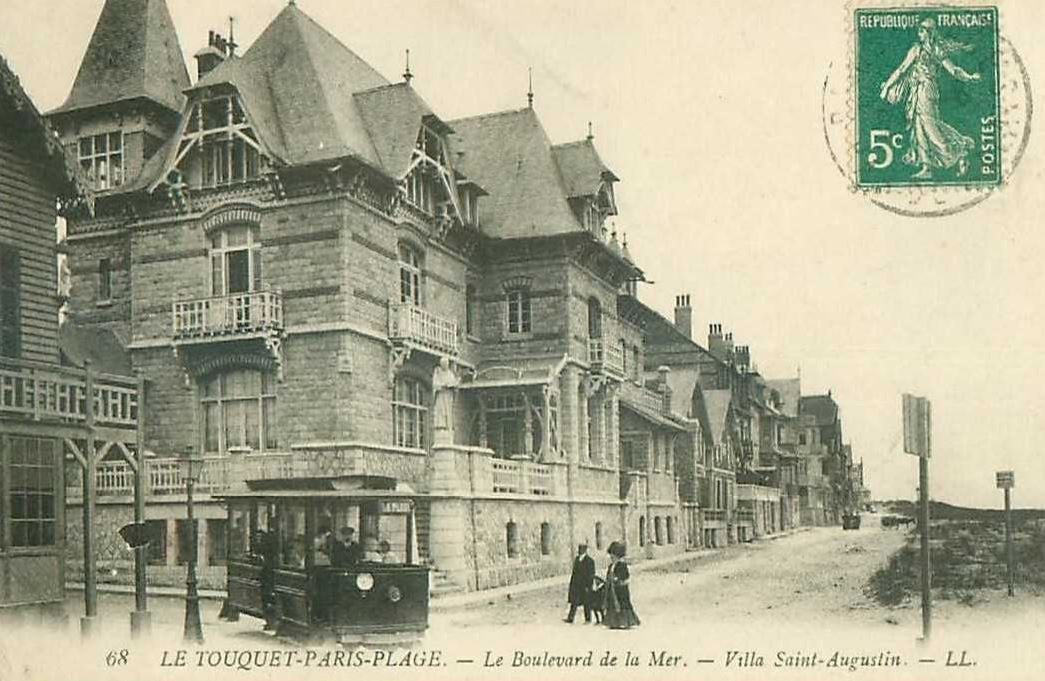
Town tram turning from the beach towards the city

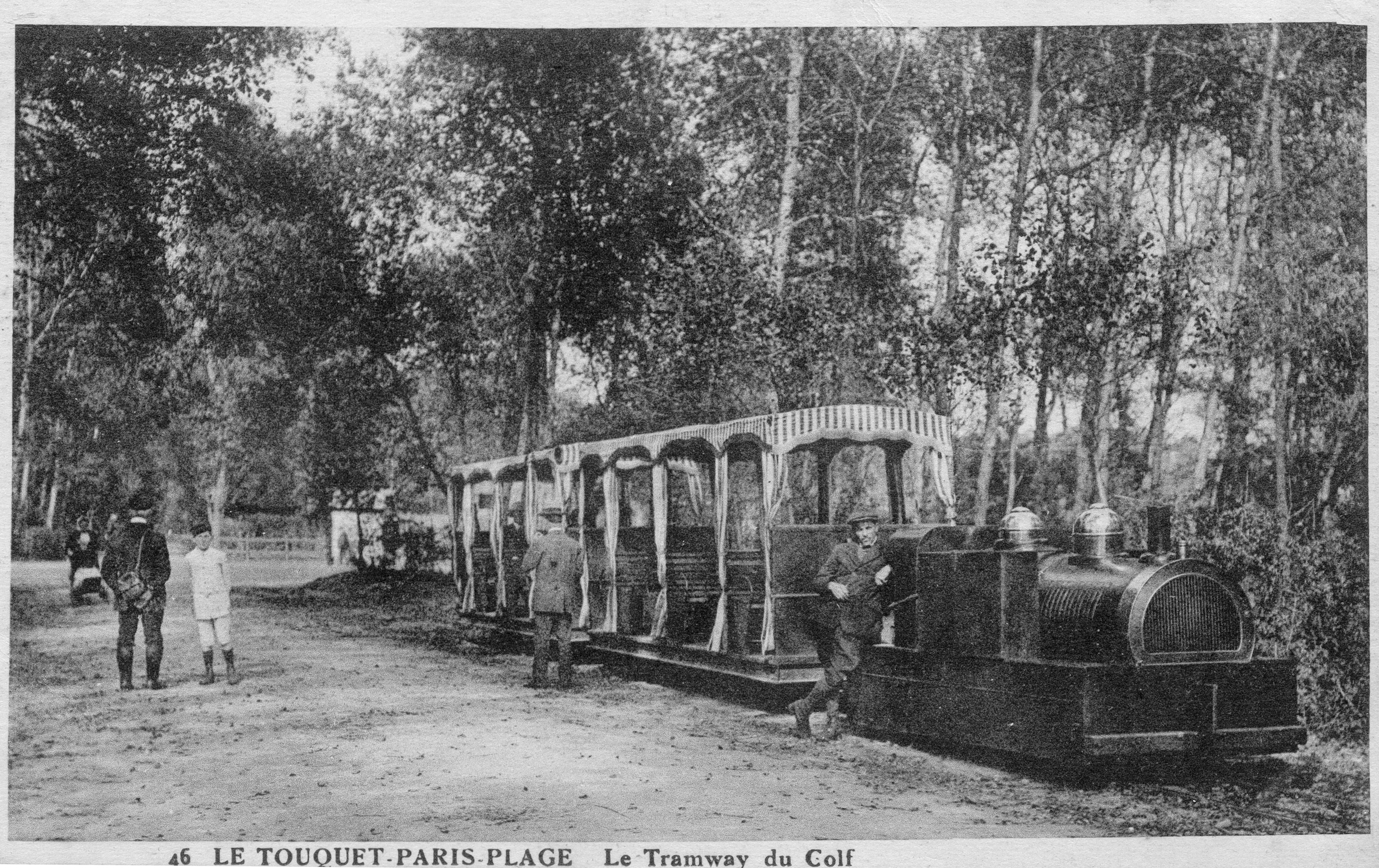
Tram from a separate line that served the golf course

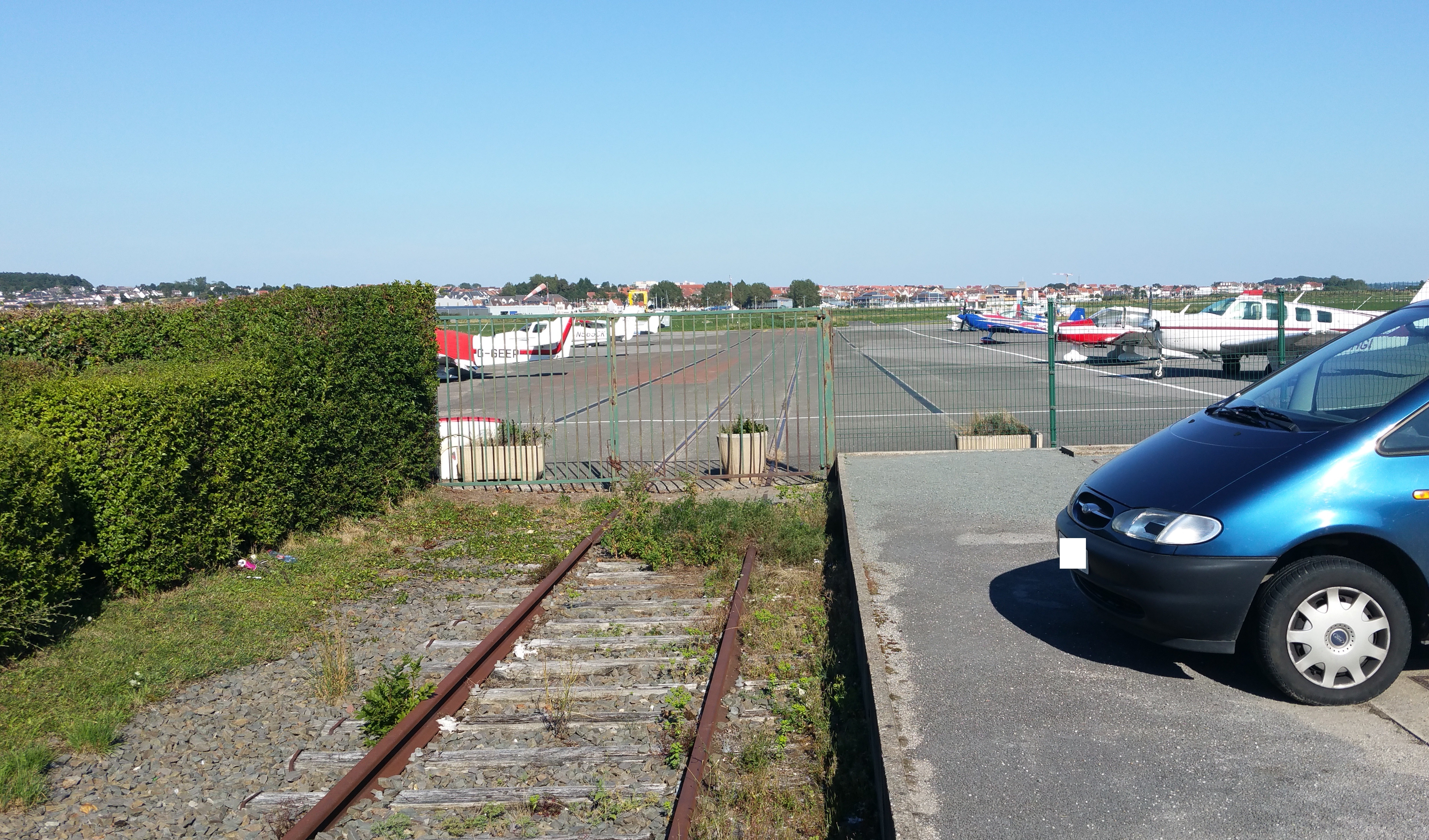
Spur line to Le Touquet airport, used by Silver Arrow trains

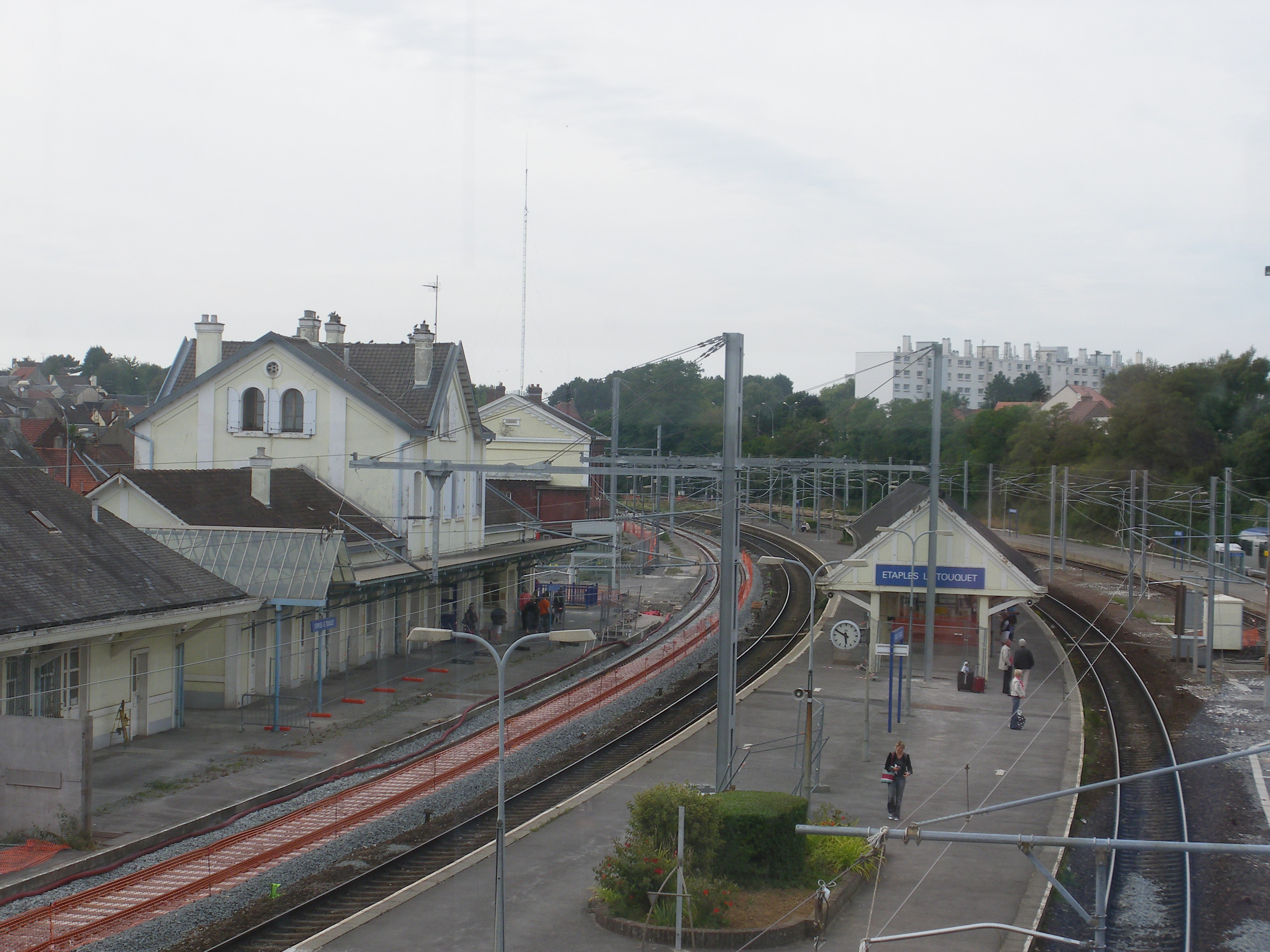
Étaples-Le Touquet railway station, the only railway station near Le Touquet still in existence

==== Road ====
The main roads leading to Le Touquet are the A16 motorway (exit 26), which was opened in 1994 and connects Le Touquet with Paris and Calais, and the D939, or the old Route nationale 39, which crosses the whole department through Montreuil towards Arras and Cambrai. The commune lies on the EuroVelo Route 4.

Public transport is organised by the CA2BM agglomeration. Three regular bus lines connect the commune with its surroundings, including the towns of Berck and Étaples.

==== Airport ====
Le Touquet's airport first opened its doors in 1936, mostly to cater to British tourists. In the opening year, 1700 planes carrying 4600 passengers landed in Le Touquet, and the traffic doubled the following year. With the rising interest just before WWII, Le Touquet opened a new flight to the Netherlands in 1938. In the post-war years, the Silver City Airways operated a scheduled "car ferry" service from Gatwick that could carry up to 12 passengers and two small cars, expanded to 20 passengers and three cars in 1953. It was scrapped in 1967. In the meantime (1956), the SNCF, the British Rail and a French aviation company launched an intermodal (rail and air) connection between London and Paris called Silver Arrow. It allowed travel times between Paris and London to be cut to just over 4 hours while also keeping the price relatively affordable. By the 1970s, the connection was no longer profitable, so it was cancelled in 1980. Lydd Airport is located just across the English Channel; since its opening in 1955, passengers also started flying from that area. LyddAir, the only company now serving the British airport, stopped offering scheduled connections to Le Touquet in November 2018; since then, only charter flights go to the resort. The airport has bike and car rental services.

In August 2023, the airport was named after Queen Elizabeth II, who had died shortly before that. By this gesture, the mayor's office wanted to "pay tribute to the Great Queen and her uncle [Edward VIII], who was in love with France, and to recognise the most British of the French resorts".

=== Security and emergency services ===
Le Touquet town hall

The very first police appeared on the streets in 1891 with the commune of Cucq authorising a garde champêtre for the new hamlet, and in 1896, when a regular police officer was sent to the settlement. Since 2021, the commune maintains its own municipal police force that supplements the efforts of the national police. As of 2022, these are 15 policemen supported by gardes champêtres, municipal road patrollers and policemen watching CCTV footage, for a total of 35 police personnel. In September 2023, the Ministry of the Interior announced that policemen, who are headquartered in the town hall, would get an enlarged police station in the old gendarmerie building for €6 million, and that ten gendarmes with horses would arrive in summer of 2024 for immigration enforcement purposes. Construction work is expected to start in mid-2026.

At the beginning of the settlement's existence, the firefighters were dispatched from Étaples, but a series of fires in wooden villas forced the local landlords to invest in a fire pump, which they bought in 1901. By 1908, the municipal council voted to create an 18-strong firefighter subunit stationed in Cucq, which was expanded in 1912 to 40 firefighters; it became an independent unit in 1927. The premises in Le Touquet were built in 1935, and then opened in another place in 1957. Just after WWII, the firefighter unit had 60 people and 11 vehicles. In 2001, Le Touquet's fire station was closed, and emergency services are dispatched from Étaples.

The oldest clinic in Le Touquet in existence is called Les Drags. Opened in 1954, this private establishment can handle 85 patients. A public practice was opened in July 2023, with 20 cabinets and 37 doctors, including six internists, 19 specialists and 12 nurses. The nearest public hospital, the Centre hospitalier de l'arrondissement de Montreuil (CHAM), is located in Rang-du-Fliers, 17 km (11 mi) to the south-east, and can serve 900 patients.

=== Water and waste management ===
Le Touquet's sewage flows to the local treatment plant located in the commune of Cucq. It also treats waste that comes from Étaples and Merlimont. Opened in the early 1980s, the premises have undergone extensive modernisation in 2007–2009 that cost €11.5 million. Veolia provides water distribution services for the commune under a contract it signed with the city. Thus prices are not set by the CA2BM agglomeration, as is the case for most other communes within its boundaries, but are subject to individual negotiation.

== Media ==
Le Touquet is covered by the [[La Voix du Nord|La Voix du Nord]], a regional newspaper for northern France that is owned by Groupe Rossel, a Belgian company that also publishes the Belgian daily Le Soir. La Voix du Nord has a local edition for the Montreuil region. Les Échos du Touquet is a local weekly newspaper covering the area closest to the city, with a readership of about 2,000. The title belongs to the Nord Littoral group, which in turn is a subsidiary of La Voix du Nord.

Regional television also reaches Le Touquet. The public broadcaster, France Télévisions, covers Le Touquet in its regional channel, France 3 Nord-Pas-de-Calais. BFM TV, a private television channel, broadcasts news of the region through BFM Grand Littoral. From 2011 to 2014, Opal Coast residents could watch Opal'TV, but its unprofitability led to its quick closure, bankruptcy, and later acquisition by Wéo, a subsidiary of La Voix du Nord.
