= Erwan Balanant =

French politician

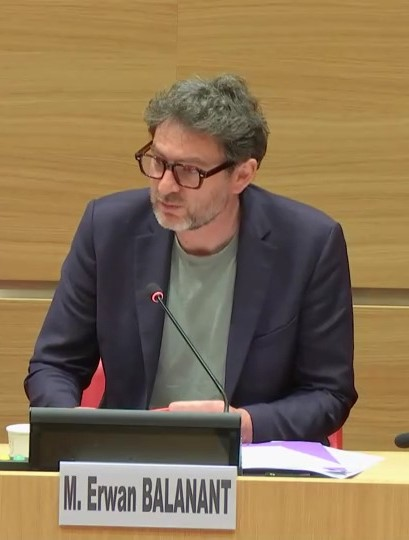

Member of the National Assembly for Finistère's 8th constituency
- Incumbent
- Assumed office 21 June 2017
- Preceded by: Gilbert Le Bris

Personal details
- Born: 21 February 1971 (age 55) Lorient, France
- Party: MoDem
- Education: University of Rennes

Erwan Balanant (born 21 February 1971) is a French politician of the Democratic Movement (MoDem) who was elected to the French National Assembly on 18 June 2017, representing the department of Finistère.

In parliament, Balanant serves as member of the Committee on Legal Affairs. In 2019, he was one of only two MoDem members who voted against his parliamentary group's majority and opposed the French ratification of the European Union’s Comprehensive Economic and Trade Agreement (CETA) with Canada.

== See also ==
- 2017 French legislative election
