= Arrondissements of the Finistère department =

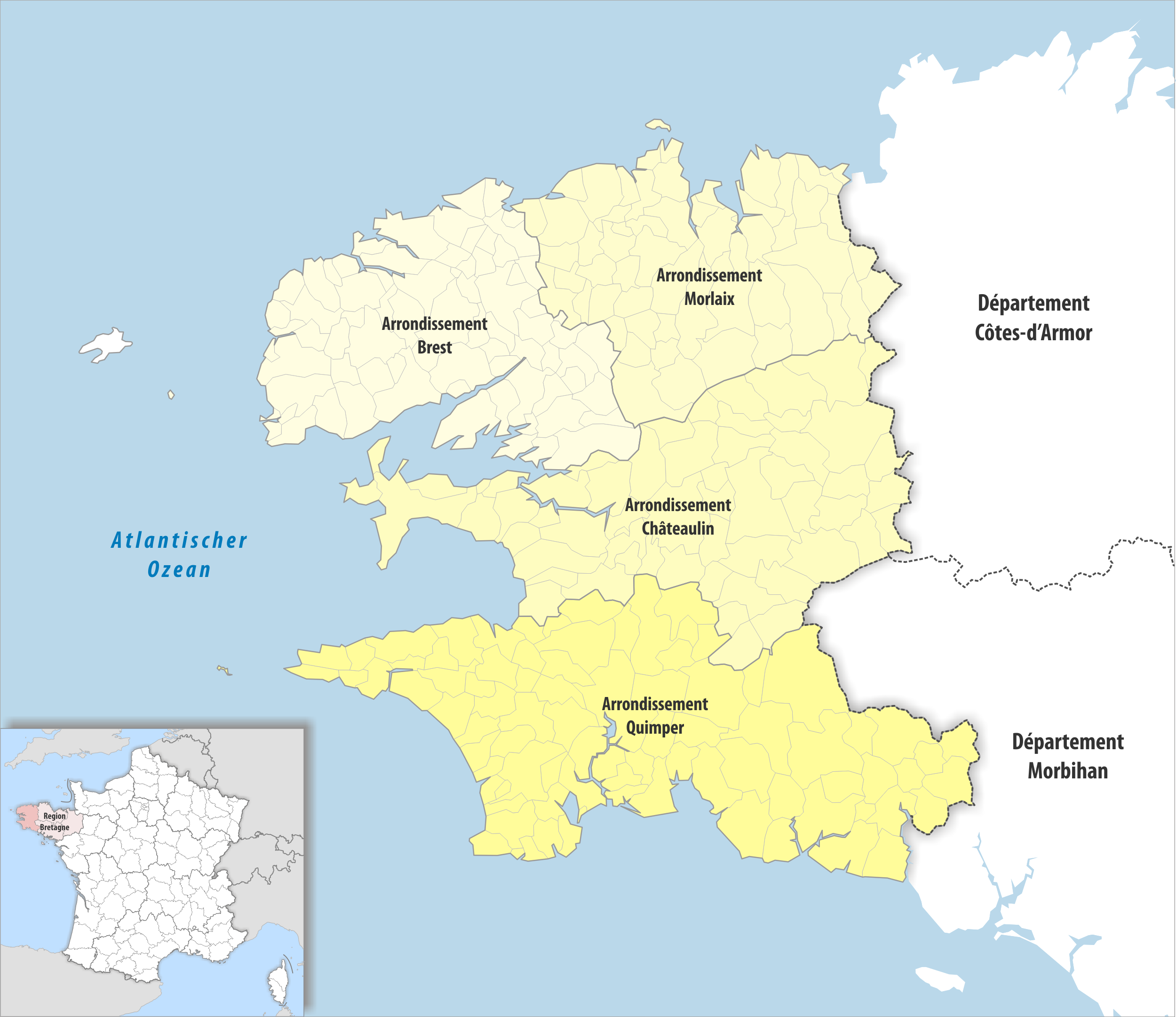
Map of arrondissements of the Finistère department.

The 4 arrondissements of the Finistère department are:

1. Arrondissement of Brest, (subprefecture: Brest) with 77 communes. The population of the arrondissement was 381,226 in 2021.
2. Arrondissement of Châteaulin, (subprefecture: Châteaulin) with 57 communes. The population of the arrondissement was 81,081 in 2021.
3. Arrondissement of Morlaix, (subprefecture: Morlaix) with 59 communes. The population of the arrondissement was 129,938 in 2021.
4. Arrondissement of Quimper, (prefecture of the Finistère department: Quimper) with 84 communes. The population of the arrondissement was 329,393 in 2021.

== History ==
In 1800 the arrondissements of Quimper, Brest, Châteaulin, Morlaix and Quimperlé were established. The arrondissement of Quimperlé was disbanded in 1926.

The borders of the arrondissements of Finistère were modified in January 2017:

- one commune from the arrondissement of Brest to the arrondissement of Morlaix
- three communes from the arrondissement of Châteaulin to the arrondissement of Quimper
