= Finistère's 8th constituency =

Constituency of the National Assembly of France

8th constituency of Finistère
- inline Constituency of the National Assembly of France

- Constituency in department

- Finistère in France
- Deputy: Erwan Balanant; MoDem
- Department: Finistère
- Cantons: d’Arzano, Bannalec, Concarneau, Pont-Aven, Quimperlé, Rosporden, Scaër

The 8th constituency of Finistère is a French legislative constituency in the Finistère département. Like the other 576 French constituencies, it elects one MP using the two-round system, with a run-off if no candidate receives over 50% of the vote in the first round.

== Deputies ==
Election	Member	Party
1958	Louis Orvoën	MRP
1962	Louis Orvoën	MRP
1967	Louis Orvoën	MRP
1968	Jean-Claude Petit	RI
1973	Louis Le Pensec	PS
1978	Louis Le Pensec	PS
1981	Louis Le Pensec	PS
1986	Proportional representation - no election by constituency	
1988	Louis Le Pensec	PS
2002	Gilbert Le Bris	PS
2007	Gilbert Le Bris	PS
2012	Gilbert Le Bris	PS
2017	Erwan Balanant	LREM
2017	Erwan Balanant	MoDem
2022	Erwan Balanant	MoDem
2024	Erwan Balanant	MoDem

== Election results ==
=== 2024 ===
The 8th constituency was one of the rare instances of a quadrangular (where four candidates qualify for the second round).

Candidate	Party	Alliance	First round			Second round		
Candidate	Party	Alliance	Votes	%	+/–	Votes	%	+/–
Christian Perez	RN		20,003	30.80	+14.68	21,974	35.39	N/A
Erwan Balanant	RE	ENS	18,031	27.76	-7.11	40,112	64.61	+13.18
Sébastien Miossec	PS diss.		14,399	22.17	N/A	WITHDREW		
Thomas Le Bon	LFI	NFP	11,768	18.12	-13.54	WITHDREW		
Anne Morel	LO		741	1.14	-0.75			
Valid votes			64,942	97.48	+0.64	62,086	93.78	+1.38
Blank votes			1,139	1.71	-0.30	2,966	4.48	-0.55
Null votes			542	0.81	-0.34	1,150	1.74	-0.83
Turnout			66,623	72.62	+19.70	66,202	72.16	+19.37
Abstentions			25,116	27.38	-19.70	25,547	27.84	-19.37
Registered voters			91,739			91,749		
Source: Ministry of the Interior, Le Monde
Result						MoDEM HOLD		

=== 2022 ===
Legislative Election 2022: Finistère's 8th constituency
Party	Candidate	Votes	%	±%
MoDem (Ensemble)	Erwan Balanant	16,270	34.87	+1.45
LFI (NUPÉS)	Youeen Le Flao	14,772	31.66	-6.55
RN	Christian Perez	7,522	16.12	+6.43
LR (UDC)	Claire Gourlaouen	3,104	6.65	−3.22
REC	Pierre Couedelo	1,678	3.60	N/A
PA	Laurent Dran	940	2.01	N/A
Others	N/A	2,378	5.10	
Turnout		46,664	52.92	−1.40
2nd round result
MoDem (Ensemble)	Erwan Balanant	23,292	52.43	+0.98
LFI (NUPÉS)	Youeen Le Flao	21,135	47.57	−0.98
Turnout		44,427	52.79	+7.01
MoDem gain from LREM				

=== 2017 ===
Candidate	Label	First round		Second round	
Candidate	Label	Votes	%	Votes	%
Erwan Balanant	REM	15,458	33.42	18,233	51.45
Michael Quernez	PS	8,417	18.20	17,203	48.55
Emmanuel Magnan	FI	6,001	12.97		
Laëtitia Boidin	LR	4,564	9.87		
Mikaël Caréo	FN	4,481	9.69		
Marie-Andrée Jérôme-Clovis	ECO	1,842	3.98		
Jacques Rannou	PCF	1,417	3.06		
Atto Dossena	DVD	1,072	2.32		
Yann Pelliet	REG	1,063	2.30		
Joseph Pichon	DLF	600	1.30		
Denis Madelaine-Nicot	REG	391	0.85		
Anne Morel	EXG	371	0.80		
Catherine Mercier	DIV	341	0.74		
Didier Troude	DVG	233	0.50		
Votes		46,251	100.00	35,436	100.00
Valid votes		46,251	97.64	35,436	88.77
Blank votes		795	1.68	3,024	7.58
Null votes		321	0.68	1,460	3.66
Turnout		47,367	54.32	39,920	45.78
Abstentions		39,838	45.68	47,281	54.22
Registered voters		87,205		87,201	
Source: Ministry of the Interior

=== 2012 ===
2012 legislative election in Finistere's 8th constituency
Candidate	Party	First round		Second round	
Candidate	Party	Votes	%	Votes	%
Gilbert Le Bris	PS	24,092	48.58%	30,844	65.78%
Atto Dossena	UMP	10,527	21.23%	16,043	34.22%
Gilles Ebroussard	FN	4,461	9.00%		
Marcel Tilly	FG	3,246	6.55%		
Stéphane Lefloch	EELV	2,651	5.35%		
Erwan Balanant	MoDem	2,171	4.38%		
Isabelle Moign	UDB	632	1.27%		
Hervé Vanzande	NC	428	0.86%		
Françoise Pontigny Lucas	PCD	421	0.85%		
Anne-Marie Rimbault	JB (BNAFET)	296	0.60%		
Anne Morel	LO	279	0.56%		
Annie Menvielle	POI	217	0.44%		
Roland Dufleit	GE	168	0.34%		
Valid votes		49,589	98.29%	46,887	96.08%
Spoilt and null votes		865	1.71%	1,912	3.92%
Votes cast / turnout		50,454	59.75%	48,799	57.80%
Abstentions		33,984	40.25%	35,623	42.20%
Registered voters		84,438	100.00%	84,422	100.00%

=== 2007 ===
Legislative Election 2007: Finistère's 8th constituency
Party	Candidate	Votes	%	±%
PS	Gilbert Le Bris	18,883	35.62	
UMP	Jeanne Yvonne Triche	18,097	34.14	
MoDem	Catherine Tanguy Gallen	3,966	7.48	
Far left	Eric Le Bour	2,774	5.23	
Far left	Fabrice Le Danvic	1,671	3.15	
LV	Fanny Chauffin	1,578	2.98	
FN	Georges Blanche	1,322	2.49	
Others	N/A	4,724		
Turnout		53,969	65.81	
2nd round result
PS	Gilbert Le Bris	29,023	53.48	
UMP	Jeanne Yvonne Triche	25,247	46.52	
Turnout		55,961	68.24	
PS hold				

=== 2002 ===
Legislative Election 2002: Finistère's 8th constituency
Party	Candidate	Votes	%	±%
PS	Gilbert Le Bris	19,850	38.68	
UMP	Jeanne Yvonne Triche	19,124	37.27	
FN	Jean-Louis Penn	2,877	5.61	
LV	Marie-Christine Lalloue	2,537	4.94	
PCF	Jacques Rannou	2,492	4.86	
CPNT	Gerard Le Bris	1,334	2.60	
Others	N/A	3,101		
Turnout		52,245	67.14	
2nd round result
PS	Gilbert Le Bris	26,278	50.97	
UMP	Jeanne Yvonne Triche	25,282	49.03	
Turnout		53,224	68.40	
PS hold				

=== 1997 ===
Legislative Election 1997: Finistère's 8th constituency
Party	Candidate	Votes	%	±%
PS	Louis Le Pensec	20,788	41.77	
RPR	Jean Lomenech	15,719	31.59	
PCF	Eric Couvez	4,610	9.26	
FN	Anne-Marie Kerléo	4,237	8.51	
LV	Marc Navellou	1,450	2.91	
GE	Rolland Dufleit	1,312	2.64	
Regionalist	Jean Moign	1,105	2.22	
Others	N/A	542		
Turnout		51,828	69.73	
2nd round result
PS	Louis Le Pensec	30,669	59.21	
RPR	Jean Lomenech	21,126	40.79	
Turnout		54,247	72.99	
PS hold				

== Sources ==
- Official results of French elections from 1998: "Résultats électoraux officiels en France" (in French). Archived from the original on 20 December 2011.
