= Notre Dame de Roscudon Church =

Catholic church in Pont-Croix, Finistère, France

Notre-Dame de-Roscudon
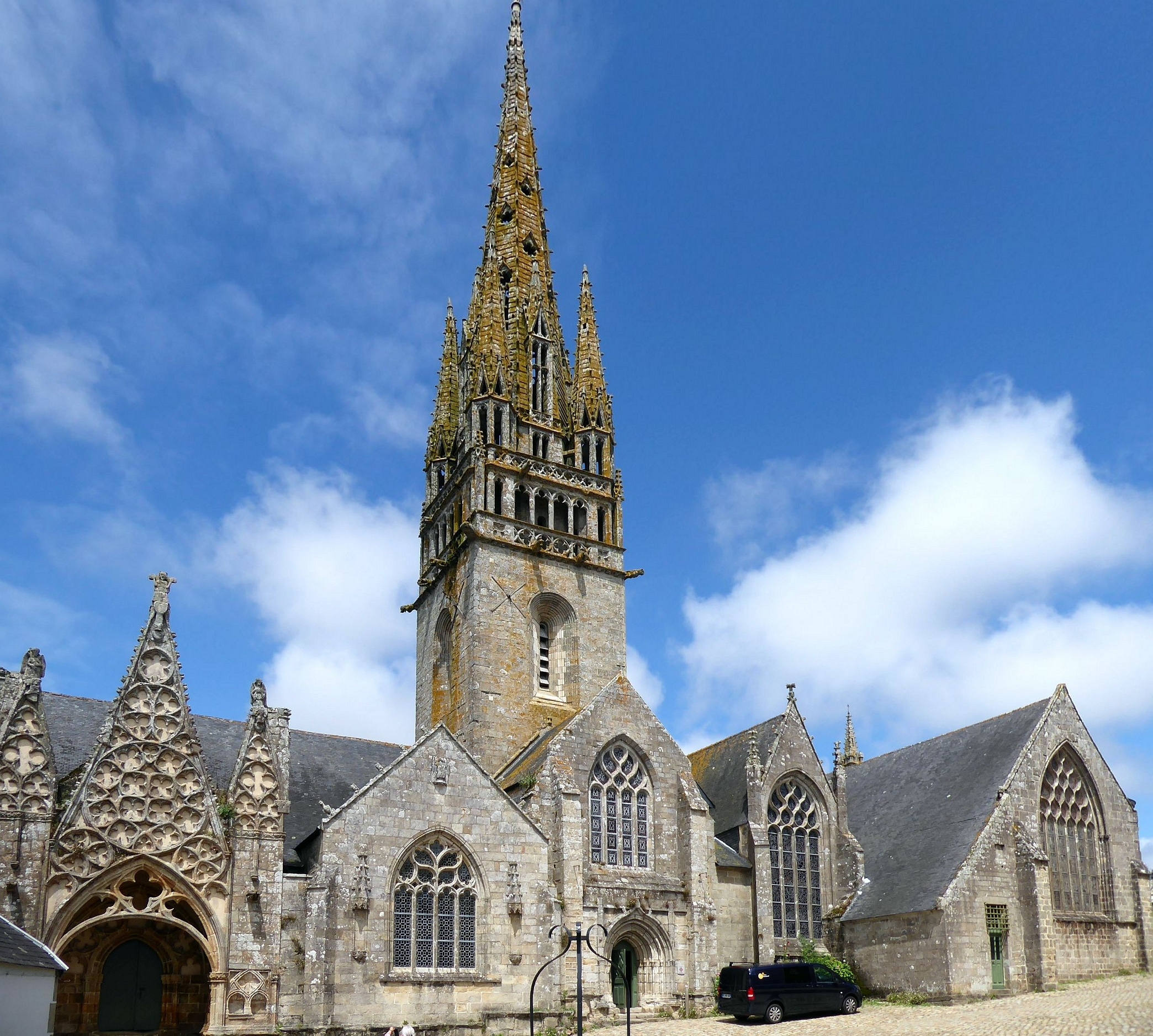
- Notre-Dame-de-Roscudon

Religion
- Affiliation: Catholic Church

Location
- Location: France/Bretagne/Finistère
- Interactive map of Notre-Dame de-Roscudon
- Coordinates: 48°02′27″N 4°29′21″W

Website
- Paroisse Saint-Tugdual – Douarnenez

Notre-Dame-de-Roscudon is a Catholic church in Pont-Croix, in the French department of Finistère. Built from the 13th century through successive additions, until the second quarter of the 16th century thanks to the patronage of the lords of Pont-Croix, then their allies and descendants from the House of Rosmadec, it is an example of the patronage of the local Breton aristocracy, and bears witness to the permanence of this noble lineage throughout the three centuries of its construction.

It is the most important monument of what has been called the École de Pont-Croix, which is a group of monuments to the west of Quimper that display a series of particular stylistic characteristics that have long led them to be regarded as Romanesque buildings. In reality, the church of Pont-Croix is a Gothic construction which, according to some authors, shows a strong influence from English constructions, particularly from the south-western quarter of England; according to other art historians, it reinterprets Breton Romanesque constructions as a reaction against the influence exerted by the Gothic forms of Île-de-France. In either case, it has in turn inspired a large number of Cornish buildings, such as the Saint-Herbot chapel in Plonevez-du-Faou.

The building is listed as a Monument historique (in english: historic monument), and houses a number of protected objects: several altarpieces, a pulpit, a flamboyant organ loft and a sculpture of the Last Supper.

== History ==
The church was probably originally the chapel of the château de Pont-Croix, built by the lords of the town, the de Pont-Croix family, before becoming a trêve, or dependency, of the parish of Beuzec-Cap-Sizun. Although sometimes referred to as a collegiate church, the church never housed a college of canons, and never bore the title of collegiate church before the French Revolution, although it did appear in the writings of some local scholars from the 19th century onwards, and of a few art historians from the mid-20th century onwards.

The early phases of its construction are difficult to date. The earliest historians, including Abbé Abgrall, considered that the oldest parts dated back to the 11th century, and belonged to Romanesque architecture. However, in 1951, René Couffon proposed a new chronology: he fixed the start of construction in the middle of the thirteenth century, and thus linked the building to Gothic art, by comparison with contemporary English buildings.

The oldest parts of the edifice, probably built in the middle of the 13th century, are the present nave with double aisles, the four western bays of the choir with double aisles and the transept, which was subsequently redesigned. They may also have been built a little later, in the last third of the 13th century, during the reign of Manor Sinquin de Pont-Croix, who is recorded in texts as having built the church. A second phase of construction lengthened the apse by two bays, and replaced the south aisle with a chapel. René Couffon places this phase under the seigneury of Sinquin de Pont-Croix, while Philippe Bonnet and Jean-Jacques Rioult place it at the beginning of the 14th century.

In 1391, the Manors of Pont-Croix allied themselves with the House of Rosmadec, and the seigneury passed into the hands of this family, who were the main patrons of the church's later improvements. The southern porch was built in the following years or in the 1420s. Later, probably around 1450, Jean II de Rosmadec and his wife Jeanne Thomelin carried out major alterations: a chapel was added to the south side, and the transept was transformed to include a bell tower with a stone spire. In the second quarter of the 16th century, Alain II de Rosmadec enlarged the choir, transforming the former flat chevet into a canted chevet. At the same time, several windows on the south front were rebuilt.

The west facade was modernized in the 18th century, and a new sacristy was built along the south aisle of the choir. At the same time, the windows on the north side of the choir were enlarged, and the attic was raised.

In the 19th century, the church's paneling began to deteriorate, first in the choir, then in the nave. The church was listed as a monument historique (in english: historic monument) in 1851, following a visit by architect Jean-Baptiste Antoine Lassus. The building retained its classification when the list of monuments historiques was revised in 1862. A grant enabled restorations to be carried out on the steeple and the cemetery wall, then on the roof structure, under the supervision of diocesan architect Joseph Bigot. Around 1876, the church was covered with whitewash, later removed in 1895, under the orders of architect Paul Gout. At the same time, Gout restored the gables of the transept and the tip of the spire. The latter was knocked down by the storm of 1987, and subsequently restored again. The roofs and woodwork, damaged by the fall of the spire, were also restored.

== Description ==
=== Exterior ===
==== The western facade ====
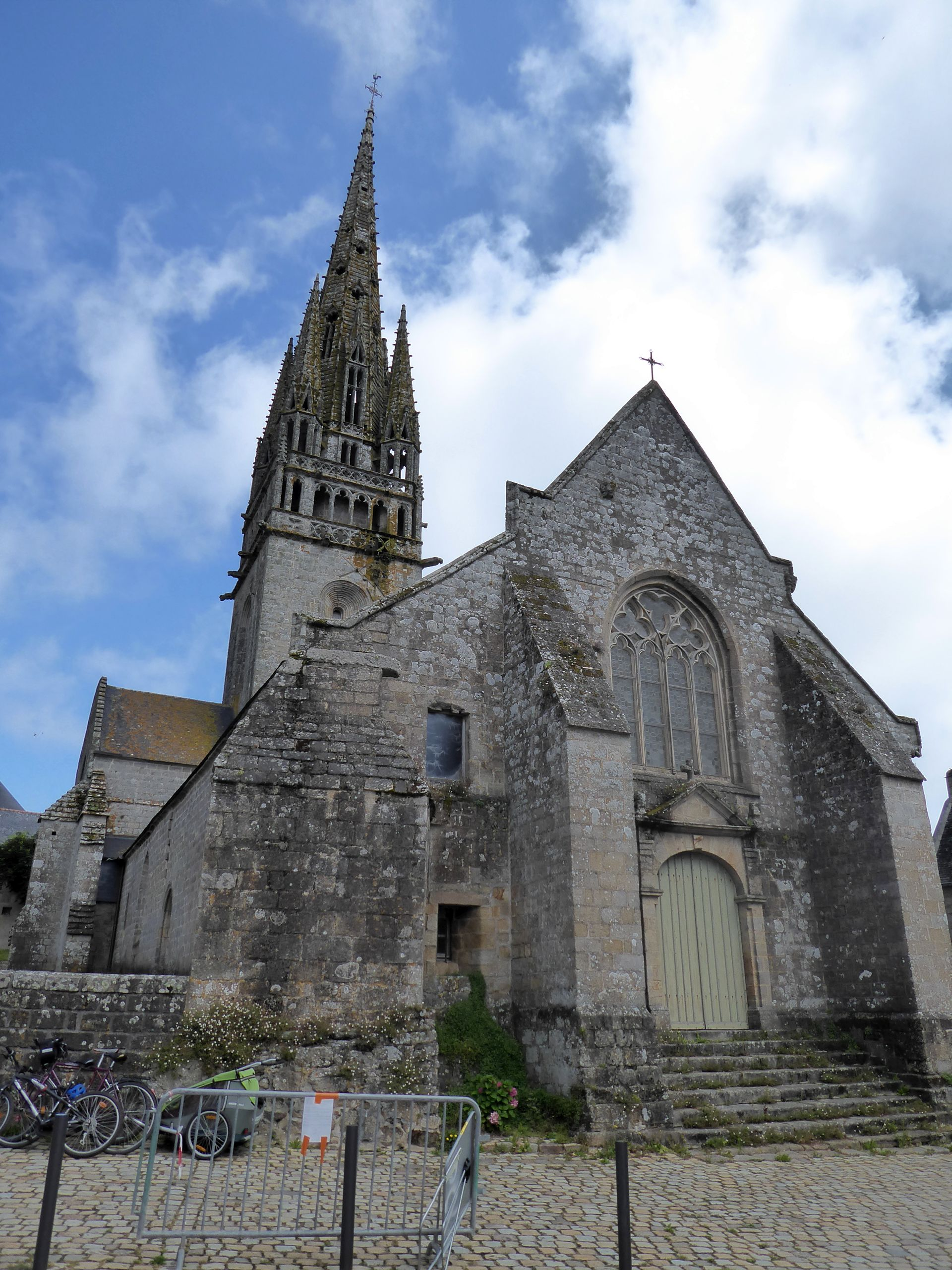
Western facade of the church.

The present western façade was probably built in the early days of the church, and then altered during the construction of the southern apse chapel: the molding on both gables is similar. The current portal is the result of an 18th-century replacement, in the classical style, of the medieval portal, of which traces of the jambs remain. The large window above was completely redesigned by diocesan architect Bigot in the Radiant Gothic style in the mid-19th century.

==== The southern front ====
The north elevation is relatively poorly treated. The southern front, on the other hand, is richly decorated with several different elements: the southern porch; the baptismal font chapel; the transept gable; the window in the south aisle of the choir, and finally the large southern apse chapel. The difference in level between the west facade and the slightly higher chevet adds a special charm to the whole.

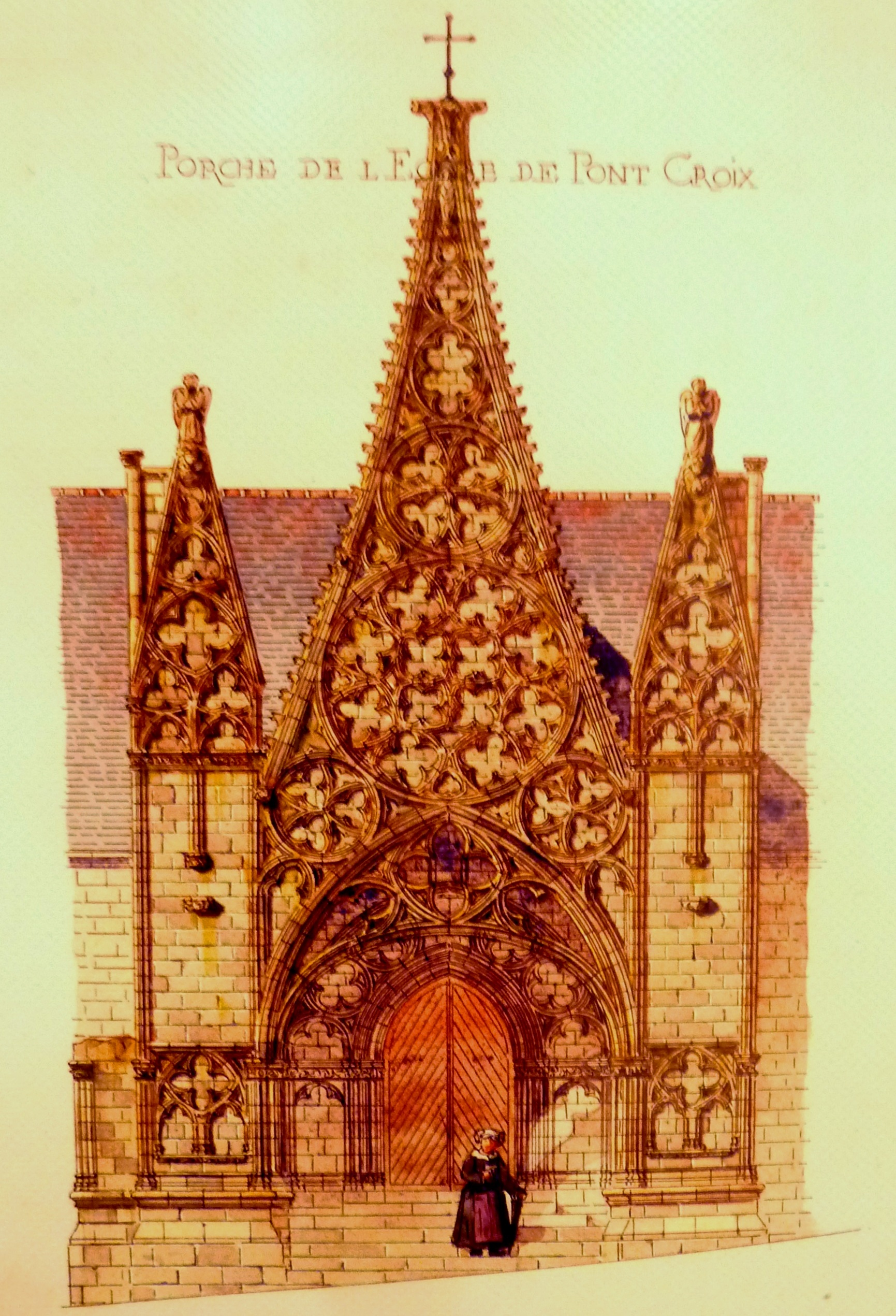
Porch details by Charles Chaussepied.

The southern portal is one of the church's architectural gems. The general structure is based on that of the northern portal of the Cordeliers church in Quimper: an arch framed by two masonry massifs, surmounted by three acute gables, the central one being the highest. These spandrels are decorated with a latticework of roses and quatrefoils, reminiscent of the great portals of the late 13th century, such as the Portals des Libraires and de la Calende in Rouen Cathedral. The main difference lies in the fact that the properties of granite have imposed a blind decoration, whereas radiating gables are generally openwork. The decoration continues on the buttresses and side walls of the porch interior, as well as around the portal that gives access to the church. The capitals of the entire porch are similar to those of the Carmes church in Pont-l'Abbé, which is nearing completion, allowing us to date this phase of construction to the 1420s.

The gable wall of the transept gives access to the church through a tiers-point portal surmounted by an archivolt in accolade; two large buttresses support it, one on each side.

The chapel to the south of the apse, built at right-angles to the apse, is lit from the east by a triplet of irregular bays falling on trumeau unified by a plant frieze. These openings feature an Anglo-Norman style of angular trefoils.

==== The crossing tower and its spire ====
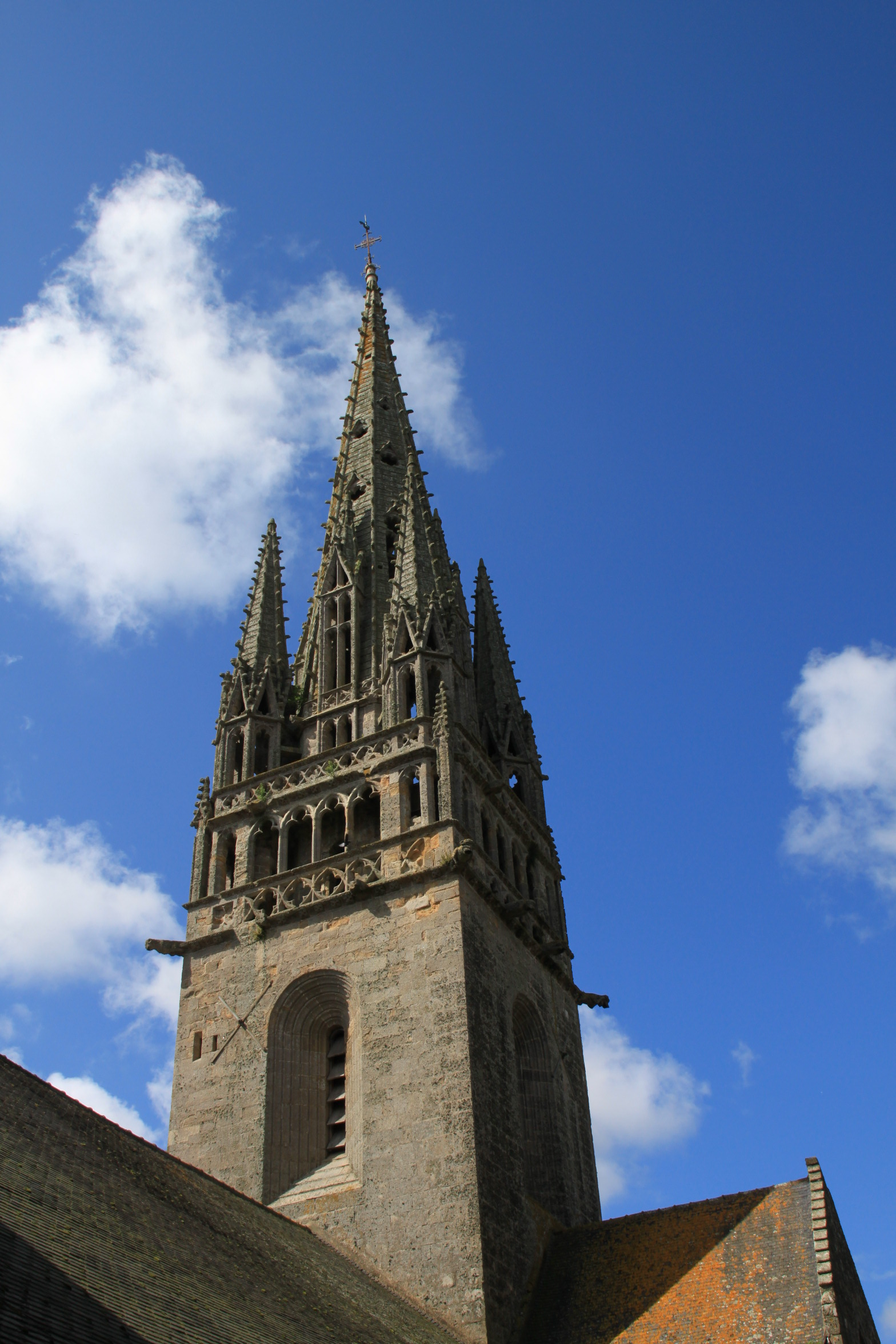
The church steeple.

The bell tower is built on the transept crossing. Comprising a tower and a spire, it was installed around 1450 under Jean II de Rosmadec, grand nephew of Bertrand de Rosmadec, then Quimper Cathedral and builder of the towers of Quimper Cathedral, completed, with the exception of the spire, in 1445. Jean II was also the nephew of Henry de Lespervez, Quimperlé abbey, who at the same time built a tower relatively similar to that of Pont-Croix on the Notre-Dame chapel of his abbey. The pillars of the original transept, judged insufficient to support the new tower, were encased in Gothic pillars.

The tower is inspired by Quimper Cathedral, whose galleries are superimposed just below the spire. On the other hand, the sides of the tower are opened by a single, sparsely-decorated bay, deemed "heavy and crushed" by Joseph Bigot. It measures 7.20 m on each side. Above this bay, an openwork gallery forms the top level of the tower. It comprises two registers: a narrow row of quatrefoils guarding the gallery, and a series of narrow, three-lobed arcatures running the full height of the opening. Above, a second row of quatrefoils crowns the tower.

The spire rises from this level. It has a very slender appearance, as the different sides form a very acute angle with the vertical. The octagonal bell towers are tiered and combined in the gallery's perspective, framing four bays divided by a central mullion at the four cardinal points. The spire, also octagonal, is trimmed with tori, raised by hooks. The upper part of the spire features openwork quatrefoils, surmounted by small gables with hooks and finials.

The steeple rises 67 m from the ground, with the spire itself measuring 24.90 m.

This spire inspired a number of neighboring bell towers. In particular, it served as a model for the spires of Quimper Cathedral, built between 1854 and 1856 by architect Joseph Bigot, both because the construction of the towers took place around the same time and in a very similar style, and because he admired the lightness and decoration of the Pont-Croix spire.

==== The apse ====
The current apse dates from the second third of the 16th century. It follows a model created in the previous century: the three sides of the apse are surmounted by acute gables. However, the Pont-Croix example is not very successful: the whole is squat and crushed, whereas the model should be vertically stretched, as in Notre-Dame de Confort, completed in 1528.

=== Interior ===
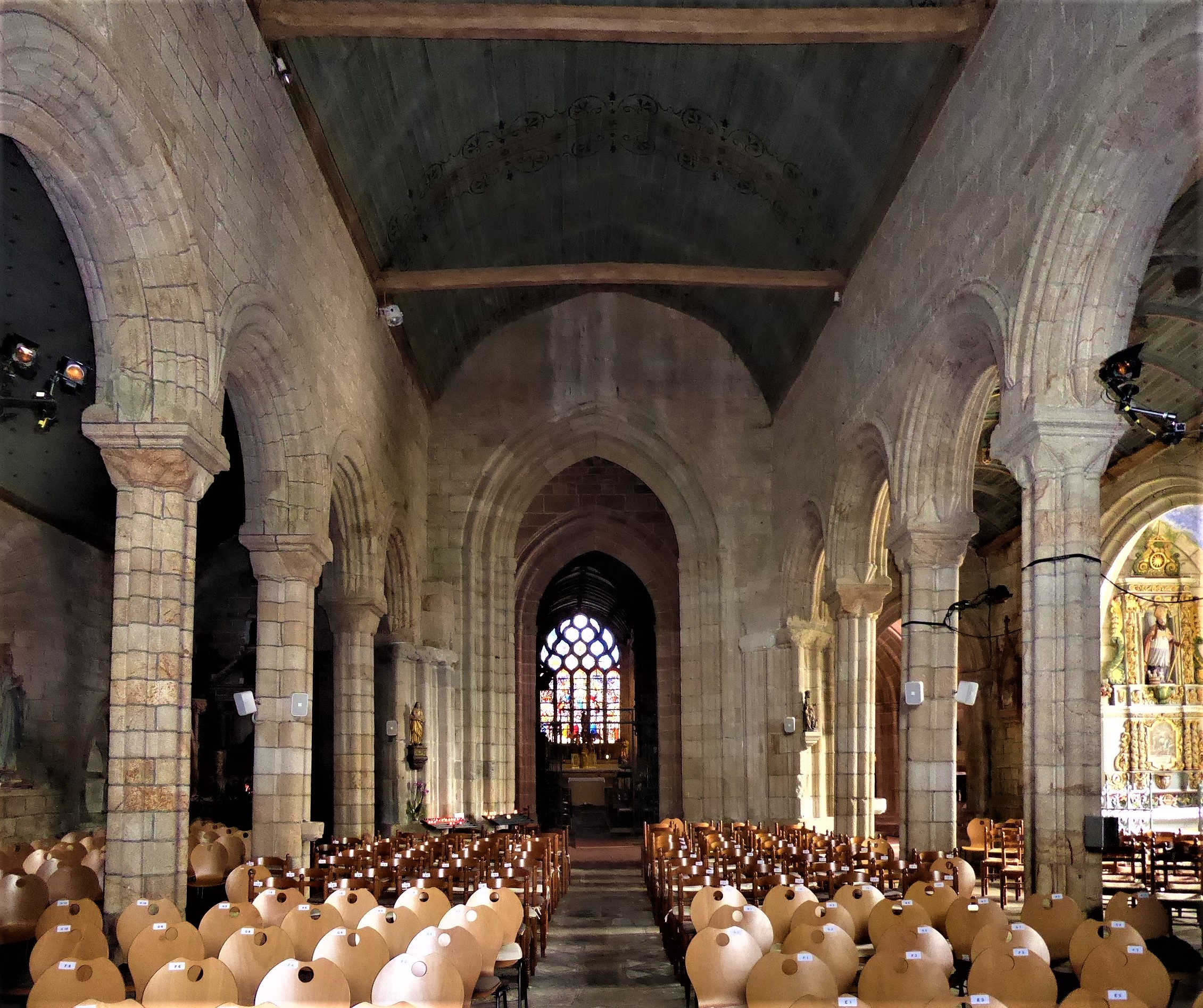
Interior of the church.

The church's layout has been complicated by numerous additions and modifications. Originally, probably around 1280, it would have consisted of an eight-bay nave with three aisles, a slightly overhanging transept and a vast four-bay choir with a double aisle. The second campaign of work further lengthened the choir, following the English model, by closing it off with a flat chevet, resulting in an ensemble of balanced lengths on either side of the transept.

==== The nave ====
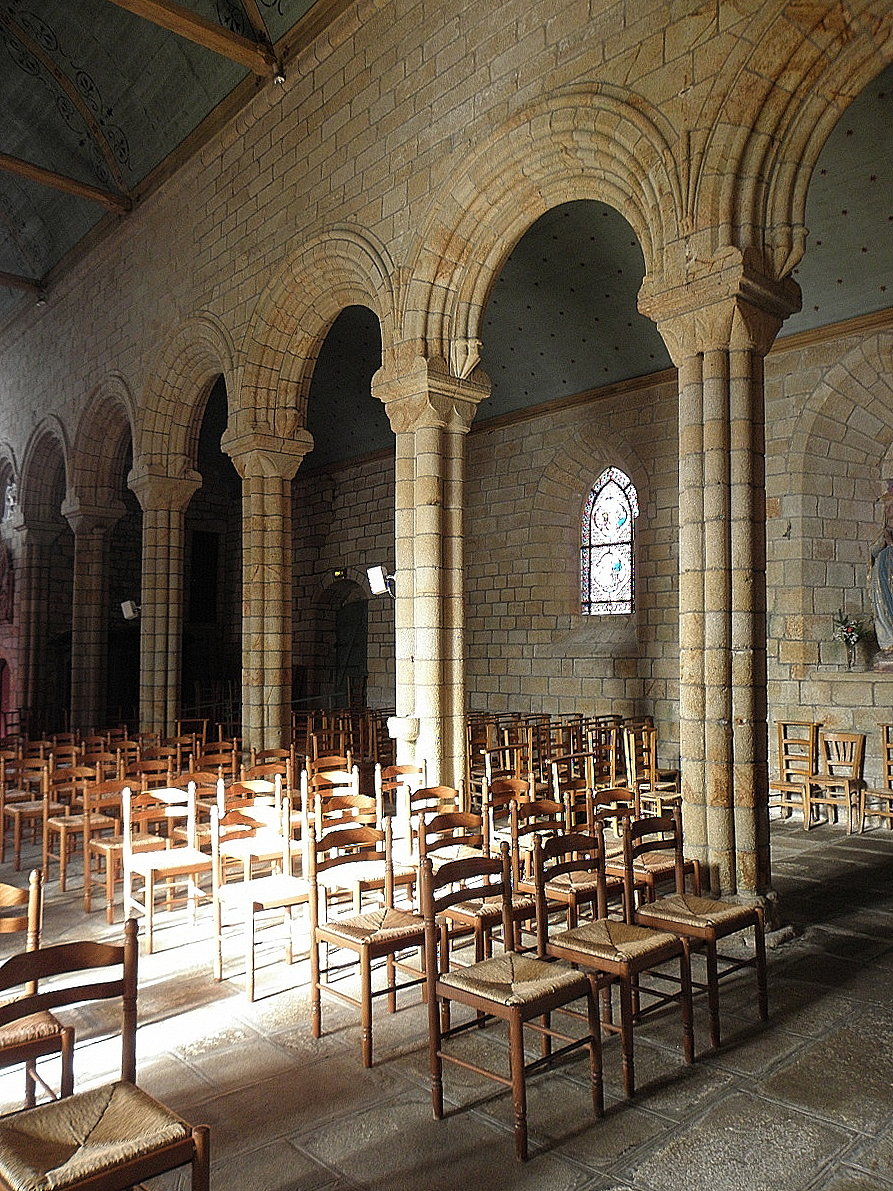
The nave's arcades.

The nave, with three vessels and eight bays, is 21 m long. The central nave opens onto the side aisles with large semicircular arches composed of four corbels, sometimes separated by a fillet, surmounted by a damped archivolt above the capitals. The arches fall on supports of various shapes, surmounted by very simple capitals, either cubic or with simple stylized water-leaf motifs, in the style of Cistercian monasteries. According to René Couffon, these arches and supports also bear witness to the influence of English architecture, particularly from Cornwall and Wales. Yves Gallet, on the other hand, suggests that they are a legacy of the Romanesque churches closer to Langonnet, Ploërdut, Priziac or Calan: the varied shapes of the piers, the cubic capitals and the multiple toroids in the intrados of the arches seem to have been inspired by these buildings.

Above the large arches, the wall rises to the base of the dado in the barrel vault, which rises to a height of 11m. high. All that remains of the orthogonal molding that once adorned the wall are traces of woodcutting. On the other side of the arcades, the aisles, which are less high than the nave, are covered by a low barrel vault. The vault is supported on the nave side by a wall plate, which supports the corbels.

At the bottom of the nave, a tribune once held a pipe organ, no longer in existence, which was reputed to have been built in the early 16th century. The tribune is decorated in the flamboyant Gothic style, with panels carved into napkin folds. The tribune has been listed as a monument historique along with the building since 1851. The nave also contains a wooden pulpit, built and carved in 1697.

On the south side, the side aisle gives access to the exterior through the side porch, then to a private chapel built in the 15th century. Covered by a ribbed vault with liernes, where the nerves have a prismatique profile, this may have served as a funeral chapel. Since the 17th century, it has been used as a baptismal font chapel, having been richly furnished with carved stone fonts, a carved wooden altarpiece and baldachin. The chapel also houses a large carved wooden altarpiece dedicated to Saint Nicholas, also created in the 17th century.

The north aisle is enclosed on the transept side by the chapelle des Trépassés, whose altar is dedicated to Saint Pierre aux Liens. It is decorated with a 17th-century wooden altarpiece by the Le Déan brothers' workshop in Quimper.

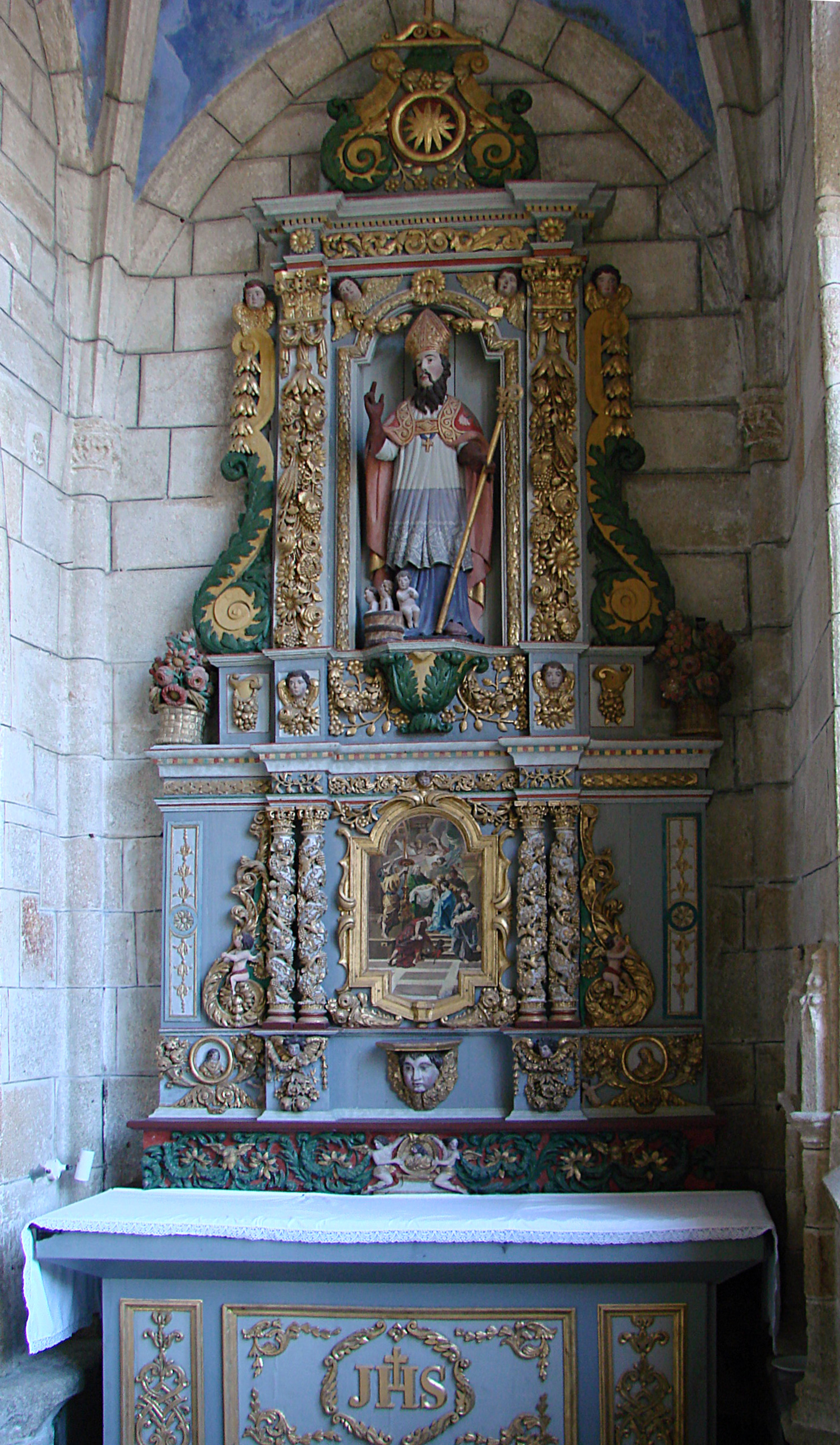
Altarpiece of Saint Nicholas

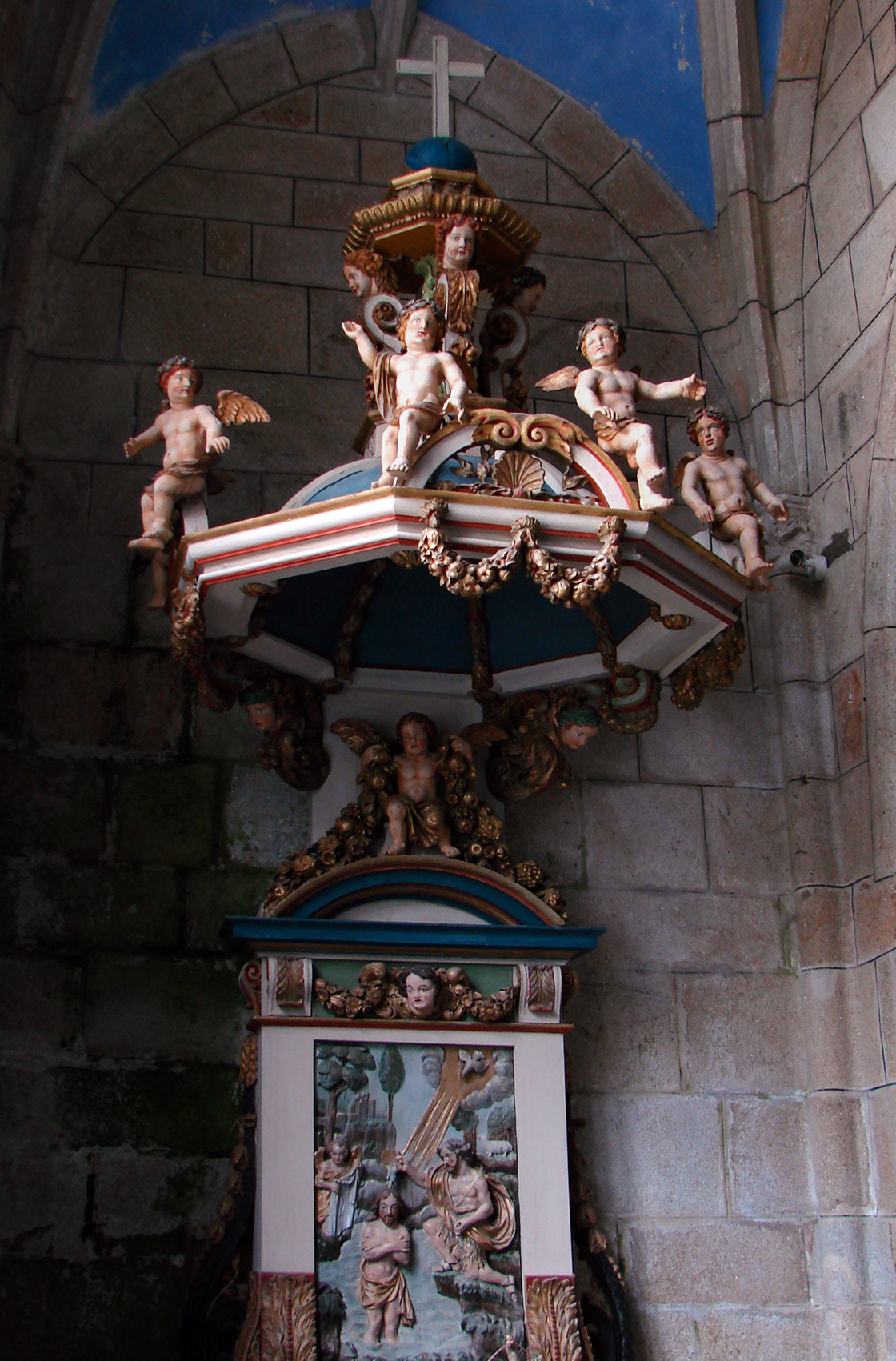
Baptismal font altarpiece and baldachin

==== The transept ====
Four monumental fasciculated piers delimit the transept and support the tower and its spire. To the right and left, the crossing gives access to the two arms of the transept. The south arm communicates with the outside via a portal. A console on the south wall features a polychrome wooden statue of Saint James, carved in the second half of the 16th century and restored to its original polychrome in 1882.

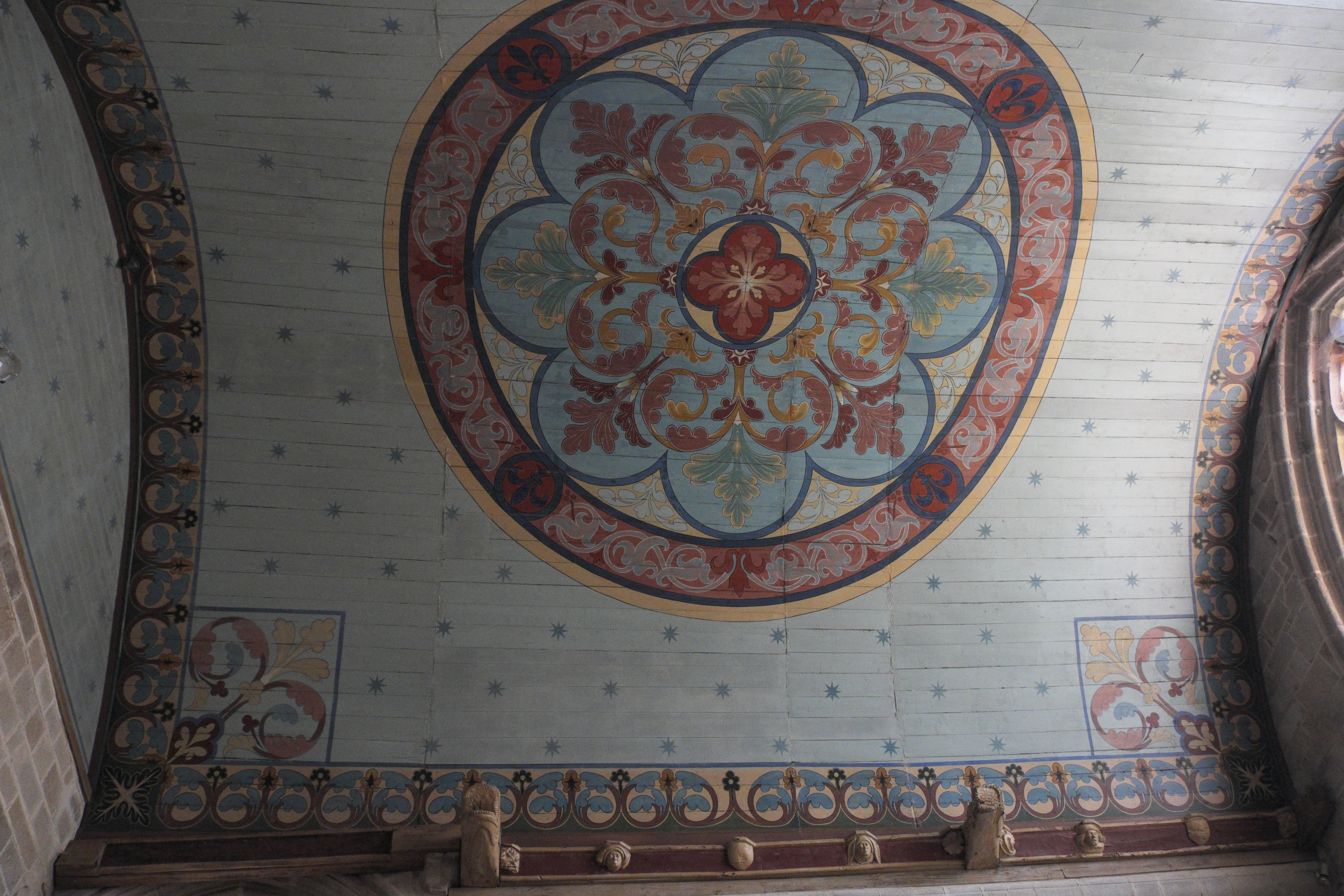
The dado vault of the right arm of the transept

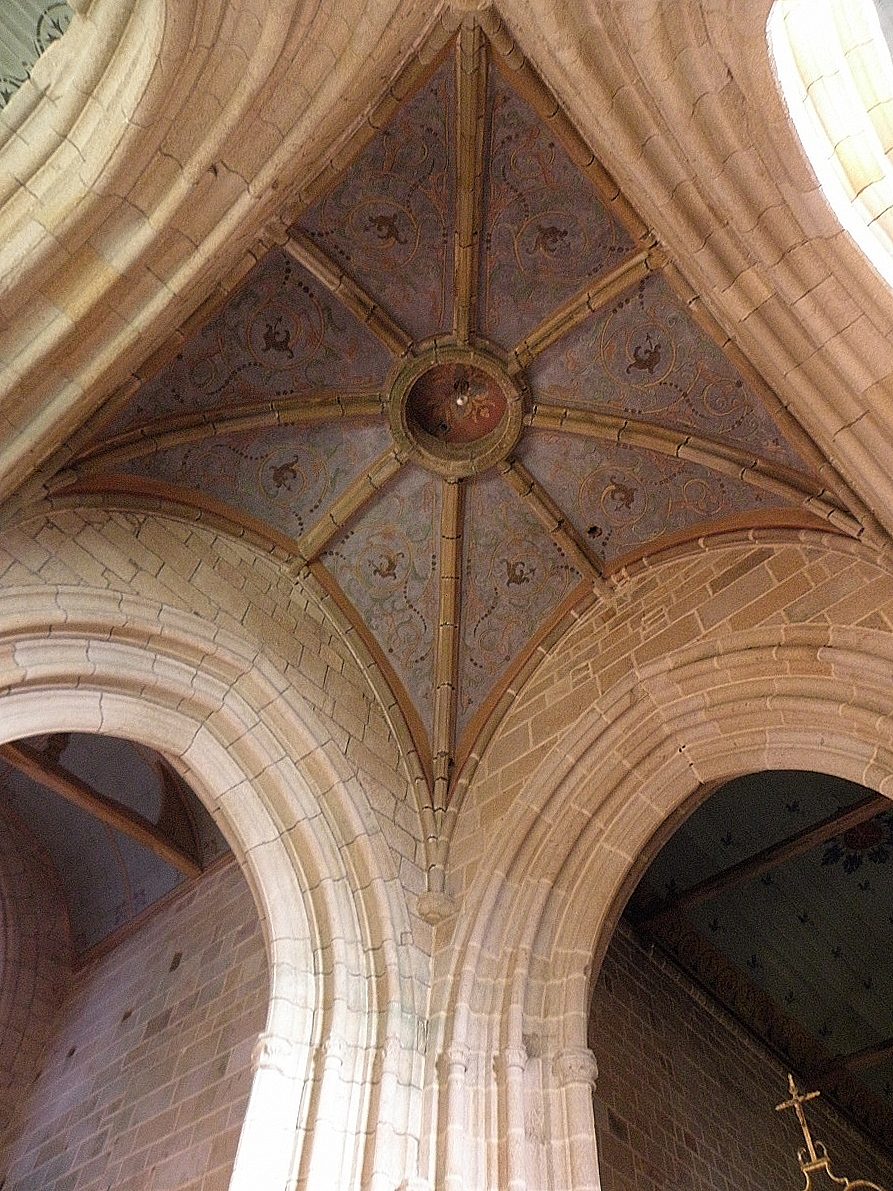
The transept crossing

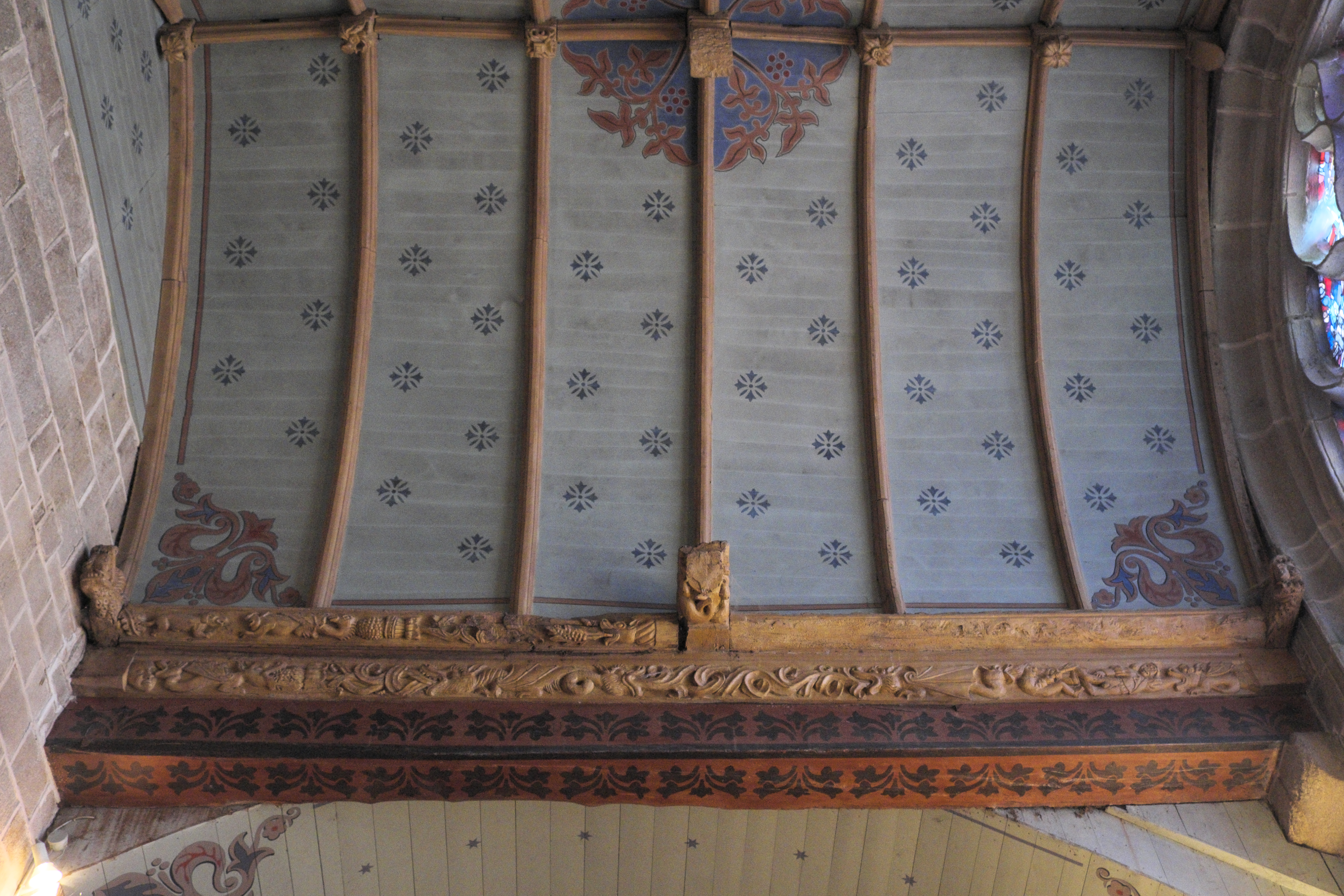
The dado vault of the north arm of the transept

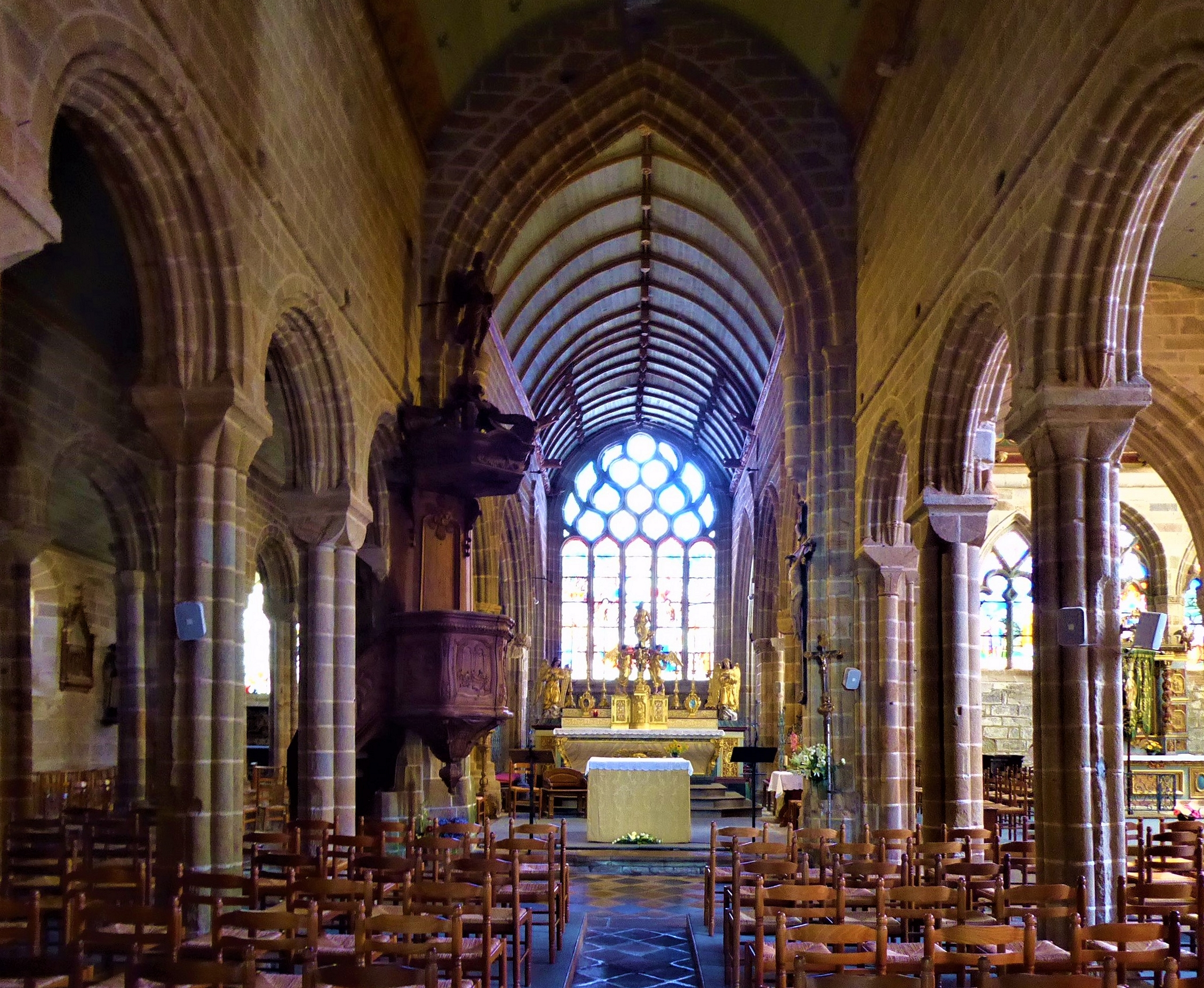
The church choir, with its diaphragm arch.

==== The chevet and south chapel ====
The first four bays of the choir are built along the same lines as the nave, but slightly wider and higher. After a large diaphragm arch separating the two parts of the choir, the next two, later bays, follow a model taken from the ambulatory of Quimper cathedral: large pointed arches, with a torus with a fillet in the intrados of the arch. The apse ends with a canted apse, which replaced the flat chevet in the second quarter of the 16th century.

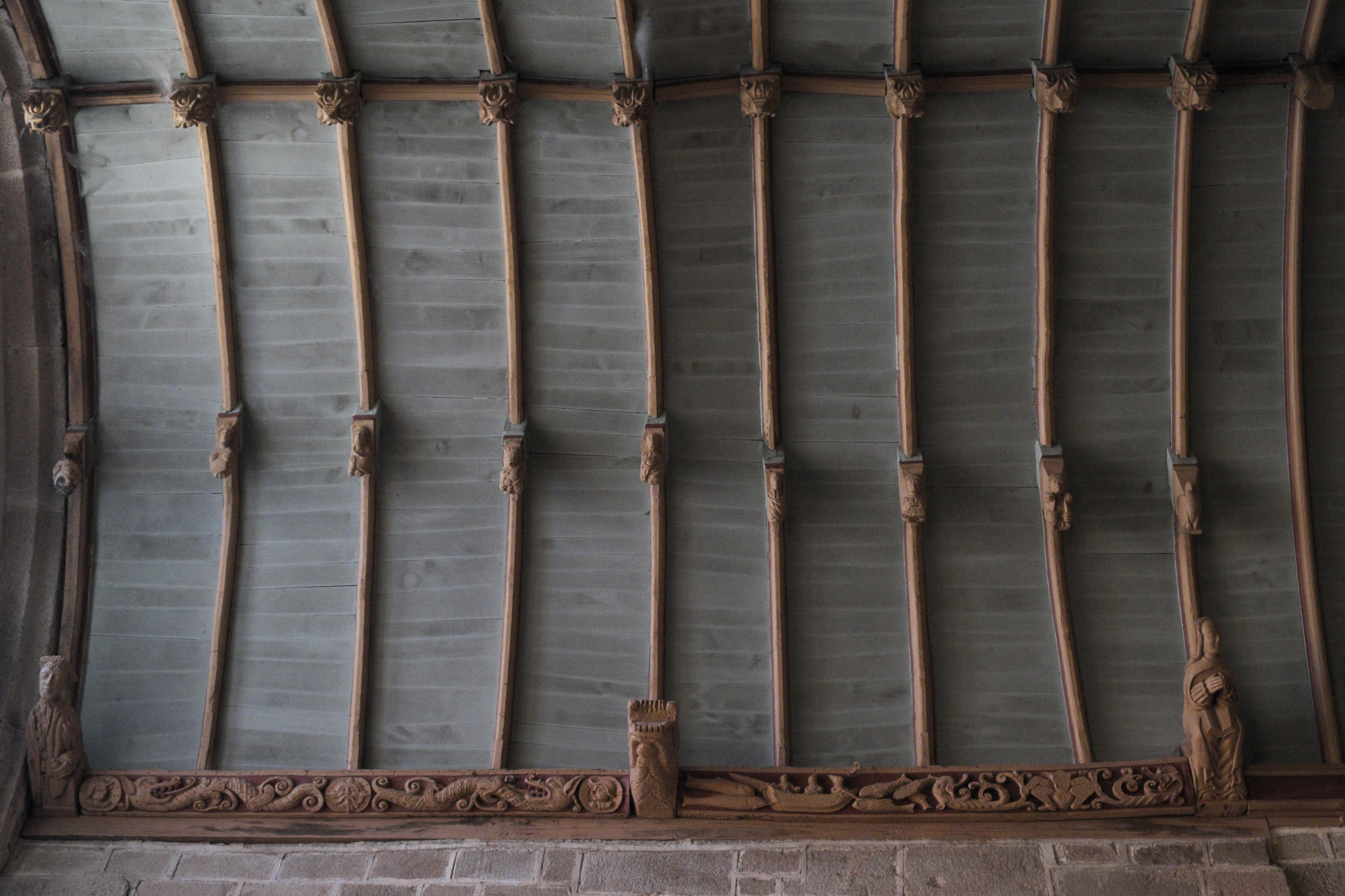
The dado vault of the apse.

The high altar was built in the 17th century. It is mounted on tiers and features a carved wooden altarpiece depicting the Assumption of Mary. The choir's furnishings also include two 16th-century celebrant seats in stained and waxed wood.

Behind the high altar, at the foot of the apse's large skylight, a second altar is decorated with an altarpiece with shutters that open onto a 17th-century wooden high relief depicting the Last Supper, based on an engraving by Hendrik Goltzius of the painting by Pierre Coecke d'Alost.

On the north side, a second side aisle doubles the choir aisle. At the end of this second aisle, a secondary altar, dedicated to Notre-Dame de Pitié, rests on the east wall of the apse. Built in the first half of the 19th century, it replaces a 17th-century carved panel depicting the Lamentation of Christ. The double aisle also houses a statue of the Pietà, carved by Guimiliau-born sculptor Paul de La Haye in 1688.

On the south side, a single, particularly wide side aisle leads to the chapel of Notre-Dame du Rosaire, built at right-angles to the rest of the apse. Just before the chapel entrance is a 17th-century wooden altarpiece dedicated to Saint Joseph. The chapel contains an altar with a carved wooden altarpiece dedicated to Saint Anne and dated 1673, produced by the Quimper workshop of Jean and Pierre Le Déan, a wooden confessional also built in the 17th century, and a large painting depicting the gift of the Rosary to Saint Dominic and Catherine of Siena, from the same period.

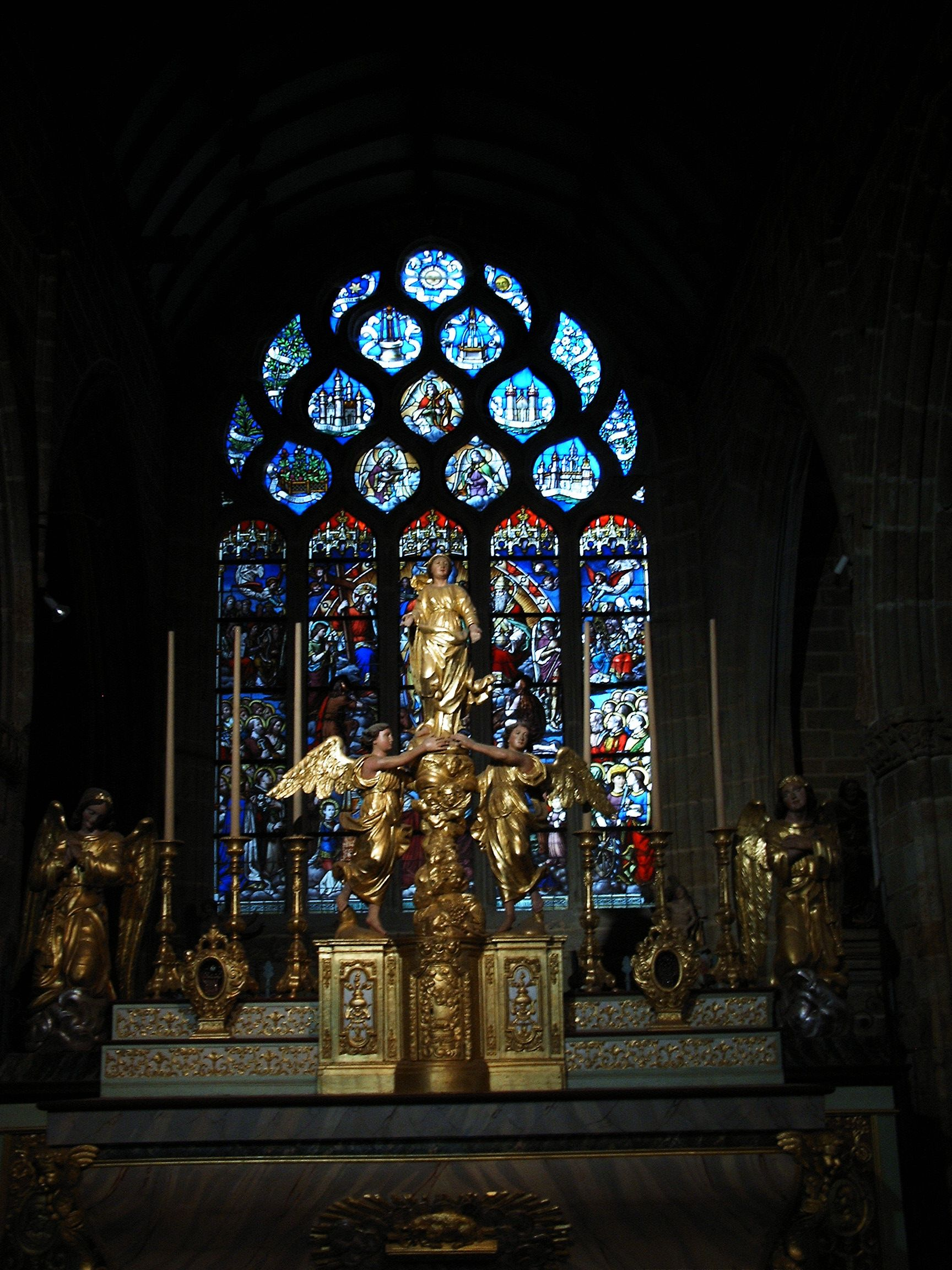
Altarpiece: The Assumption of the Virgin

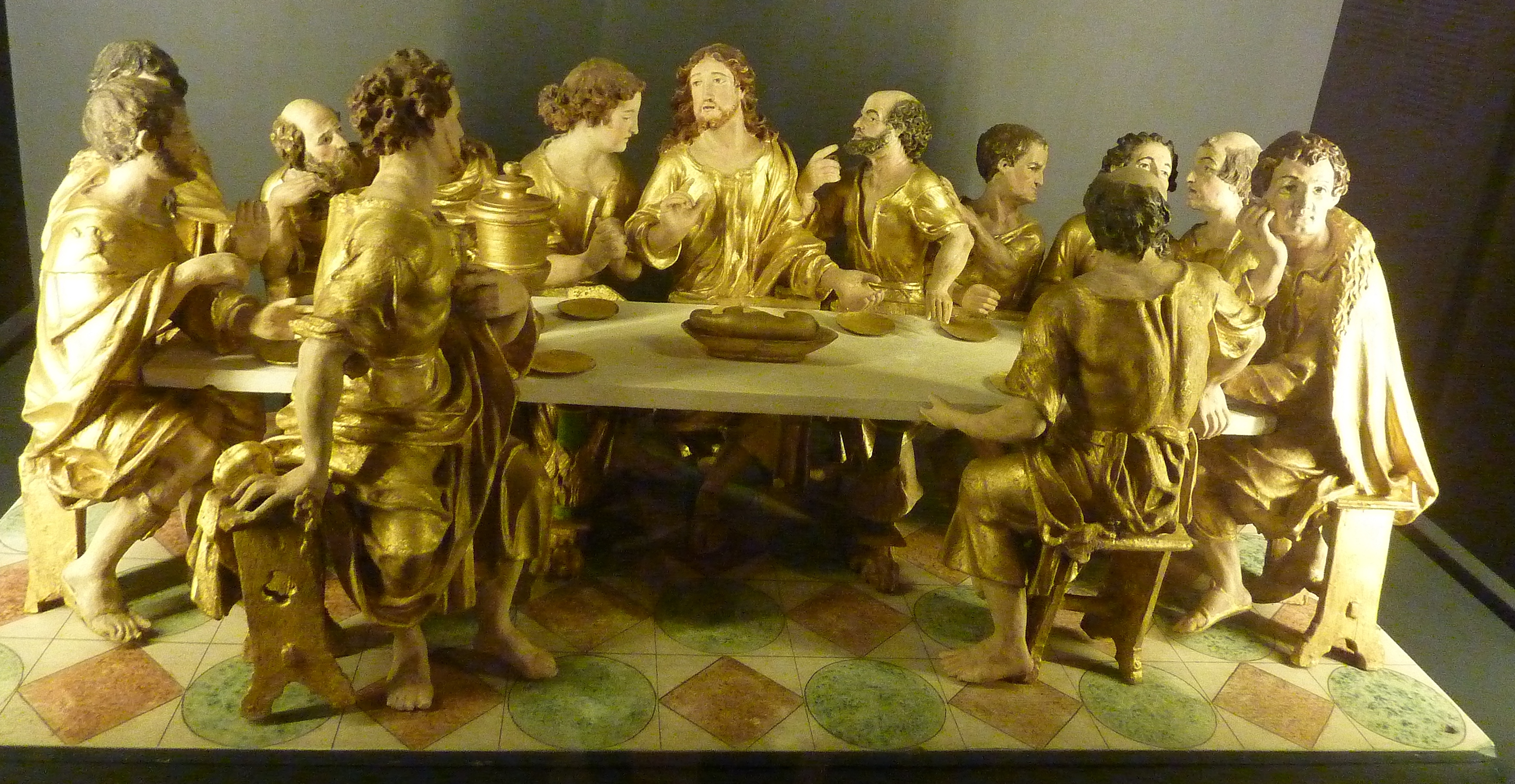
The Last Supper, altarpiece relief

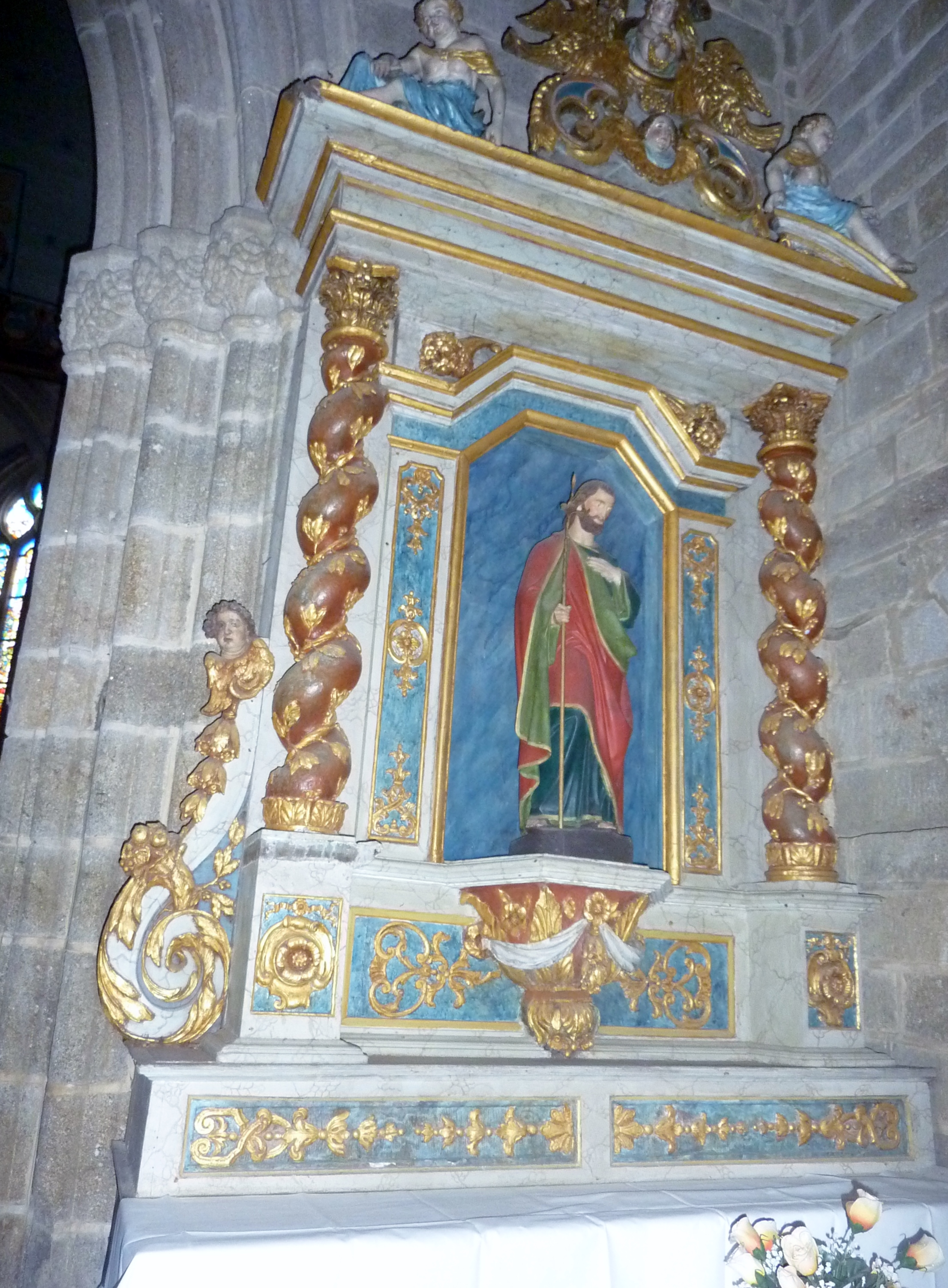
Altarpiece of Saint Joseph

== Stained-glass ==
=== Antique stained-glass ===
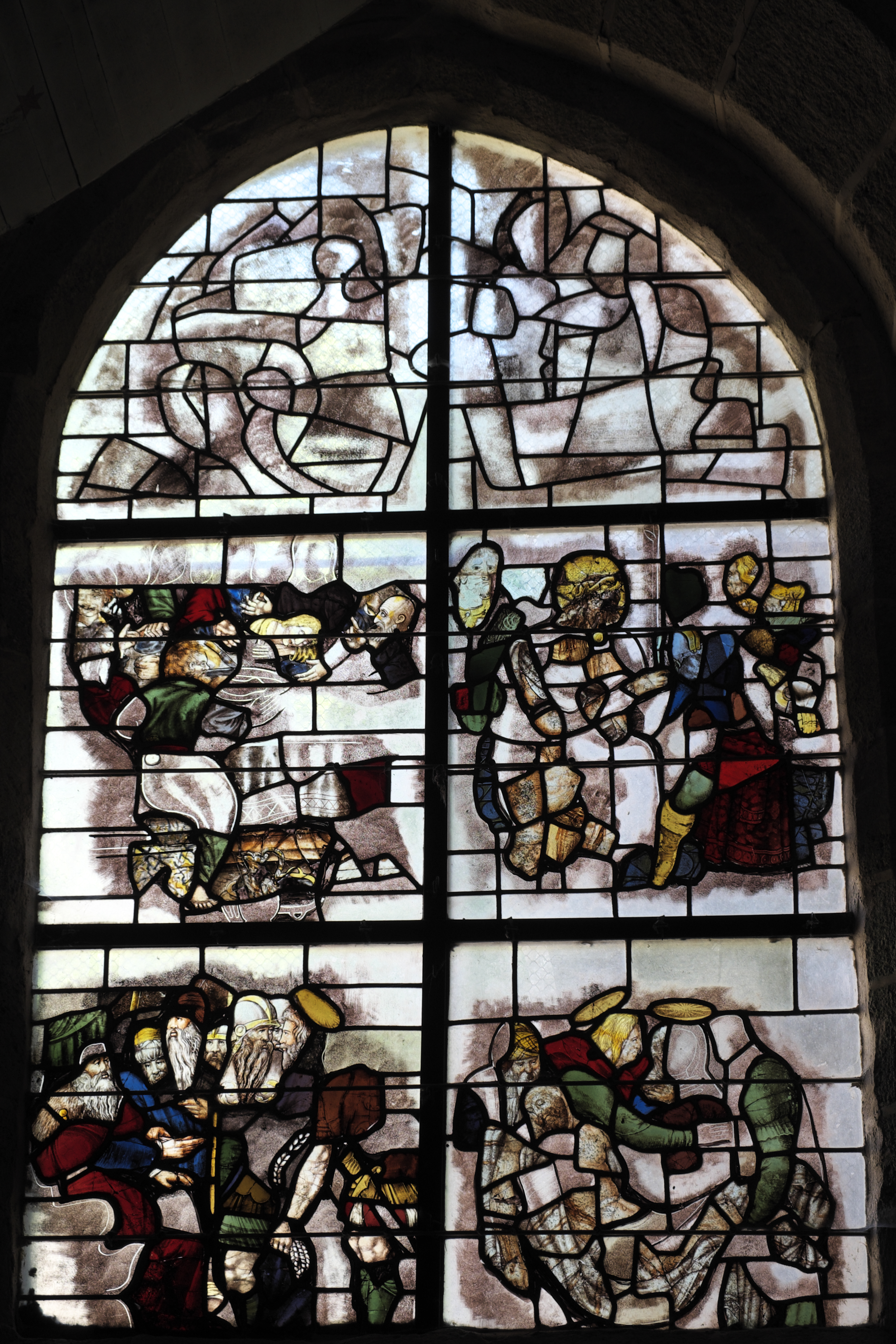
Stained glass window of the Passion of Christ.

The church of Notre-Dame de Roscudon once contained more ancient stained-glass windows than it does today; many have been lost or have been grouped together in the two surviving stained-glass windows in bays 3, in the ambulatory, and 10, in the Rosary chapel. At the beginning of the 15th century, there was a main window depicting Sinquin de Pont-Croix; two windows dedicated to Saint Barbara and Saint Margaret are also attested from the mid-18th century.

==== The Passion stained-glass window (bay 3) ====
The third bay, which consists of a two-registered lancet, contains fragments of Passion scenes dating from the last quarter of the 16th century, reinstalled in painted white glass backgrounds during a restoration carried out around 1990 by master glassmaker Le Bihan. Above are the Last Supper and what appears to be an Ecce Homo, and below are fragments of several different scenes and a Burial of Jesus.

==== The Infancy of Christ window (bay 10) ====
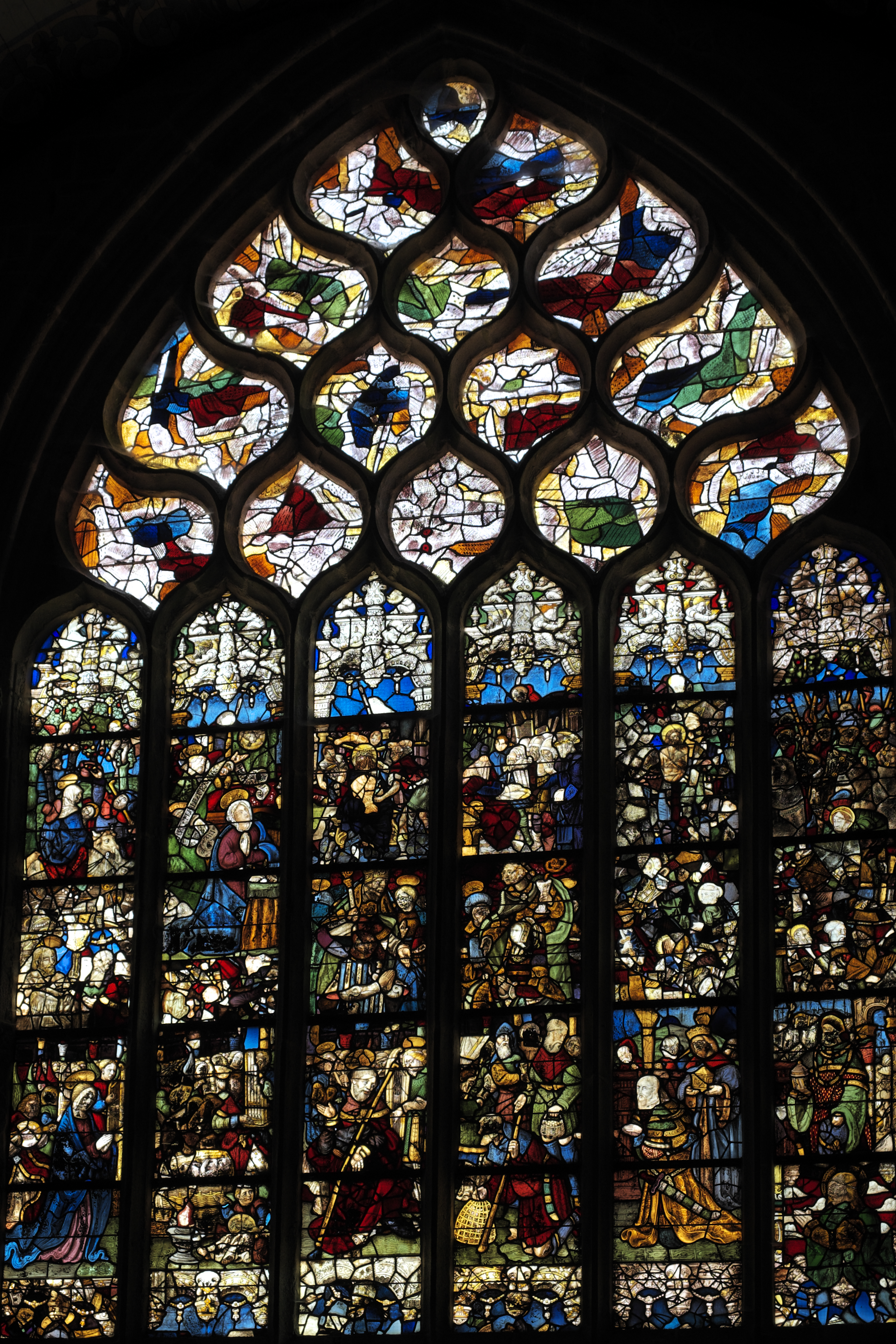
Stained glass window of the Infancy of Christ.

Located to the south of the large chevet chapel, known as the Notre-Dame du Rosaire chapel, the large stained glass window portraying the Infancy of Christ features six lancets surmounted by a tympanum with 15 openings. Most of the stained glass portrays the Infancy of Christ, and can be dated to around 1540, in line with the production of the Quimper workshops at that time, thanks to its similarities with the Notre-Dame du Crann chapel in Spézet. Panels from other bays in the church, produced at various times during the 16th century, complete the groupe.

The first register shows a Nativity scene with the Holy Family in the three left-hand lancets, the Shepherds in the fourth and the Magi in the last two. The upper register is composed as follows: the Flight into Egypt, incomplete, in the first lancet; an Annunciation from the third quarter of the 16th century, taken from another bay; donation panels of Alain II de Rosmadec and Jeanne du Chastel with their patron saints, surmounted by a Coronation of Thorns and an Appearance of Christ, the whole being replaced from other bays; finally, the Flagellation, and what is perhaps an element of a large Crucifixion. The spandrel received abstract stained-glass windows during the 1991 restoration by master stained-glass artist Jean-Pierre Le Bihan.

=== Modern stained glass ===
Modern stained glass windows from the 19th and 20th centuries complement these ancient windows. The central bay, portraying the Coronation of the Virgin, was donated in 1884 by Jeanne-Catherine Vesseyre and created by master stained-glass artist Küchelbecker et Jacquier. The second bay, from the same workshop, depicts the Tree of Jesse surrounded by four biblical heroines. Bays 4, 6 and 8, made by the Nantes master glassmaker Ely in 1880, portray apparitions of the Virgin Mary at La Salette, to St. Dominic and St. Catherine of Siena, and at Lourdes. Bay 12, designed by master glassmakers Gruber and Josette Mahuzier between 1975 and 1977, depicts the Virgin and Saint Anne. Finally, bay 16 features a mid-20th-century geometric glass roof.

On the north side, for bay 1, parish priest Auguste Téphany commissioned Parisian master glassmaker Anglade in 1889 to create an Arbre des Apôtres (Apostles' Tree), i.e. an apostolic college in a plant setting with articles from the Creed. The aim was to pay tribute to his predecessor, Abbé Yvenat, whose family had commissioned several of the stained glass windows in canopies 7 to 13, 17 and 19, portraying saints Barthélemy, Augustin and Monica, Alfred, Hilarion, Catherine and Ivo. Like the axis bay, all these windows were produced by the Küchelbecker et Jacquier workshop. Bay 15 features a Burial of Jesus and Resurrection, created in 1975-1977 by Gruber and Josette Mahuzier.

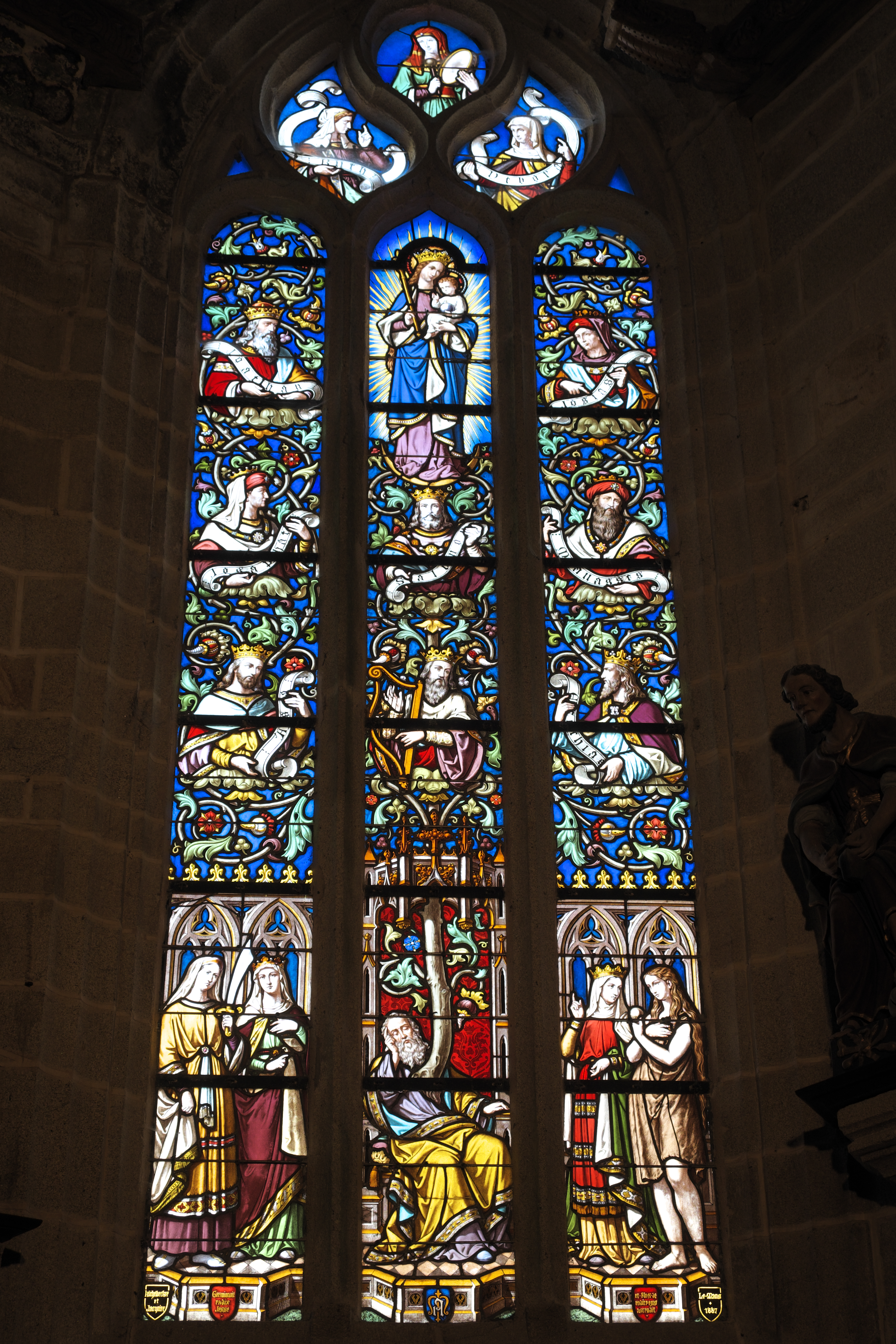
The Tree of Jesse glass roof in the ambulatory

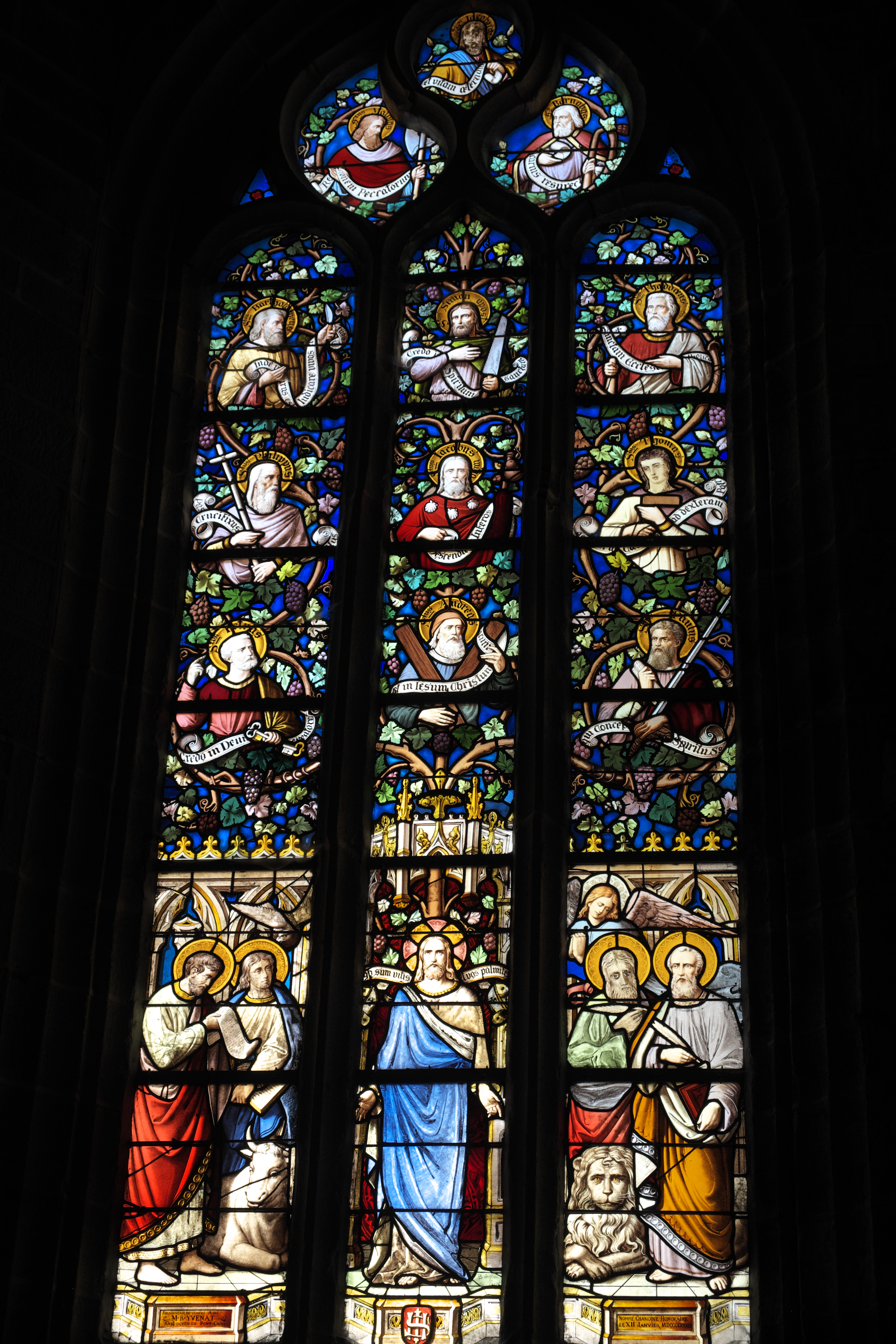
The Tree of the Apostles

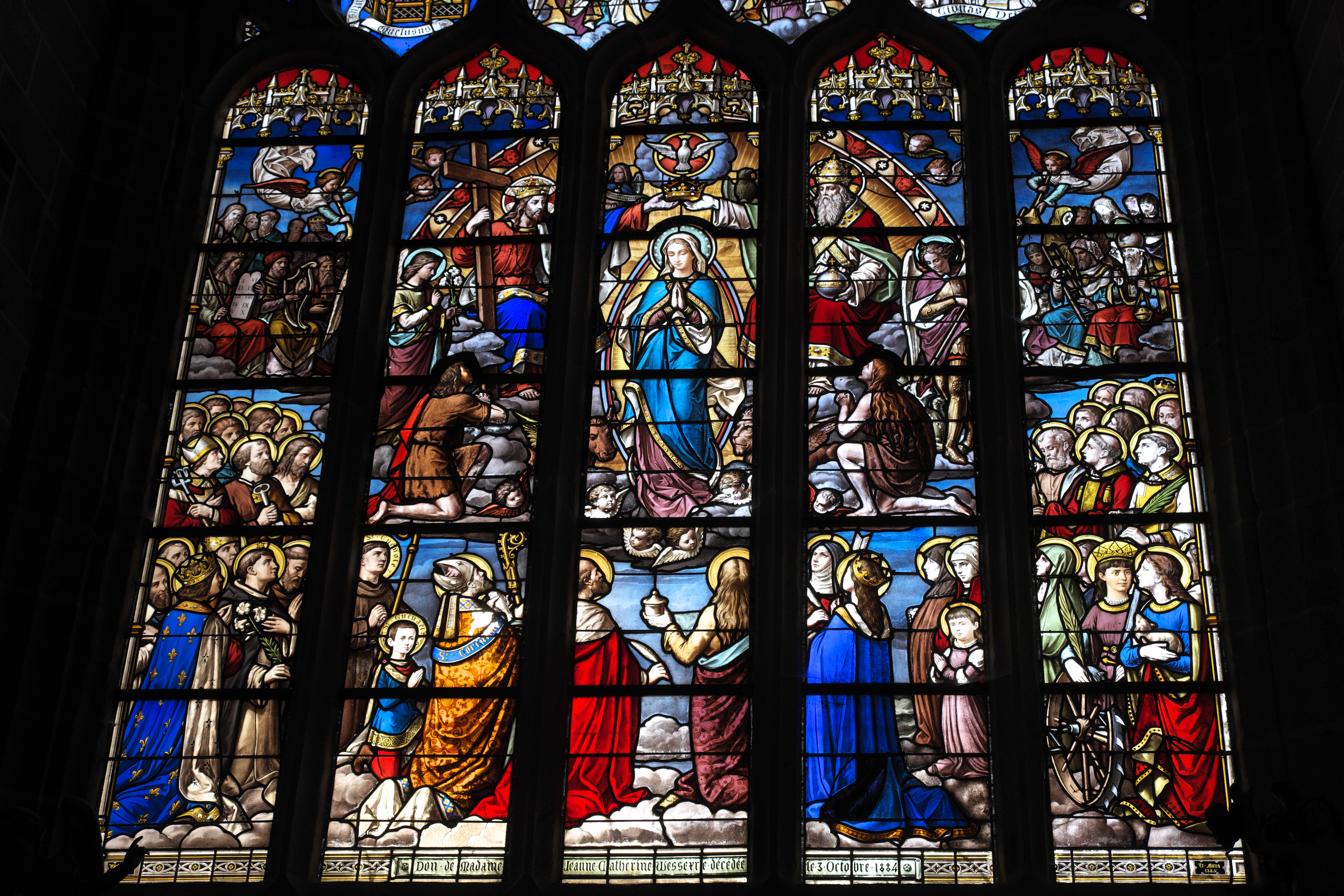
Coronation of the Virgin (axis bay)

== Bibliography ==
- Bigot, Joseph (1894). "Mémoire sur les clochers du Finistère". Bulletin de la Société archéologique du Finistère (in French). pp. 355–376.
- Bonnet, Philippe; Rioult, Jean-Jacques (2010). "Pont-Croix. Eglise Notre-Dame de Roscudon". Bretagne gothique. Vol. Les Monuments de la France gothique. Paris: Picard. pp. 292–301. ISBN 978-2-7084-0883-8.
  Couffon, René (1951). "Notre-Dame de Roscudon et l'atelier de Pont-Croix". Mémoires de la société d'histoire et d'archéologie de Bretagne. Vol. 31. pp. 5–36.
- Couffon, René (1957). Pont-Croix : Notre-Dame de Roscudon. Cornouaille: Congrès archéologique de France, Orléans. pp. 41–50.
  Gallet, Yves (2009). Pont-Croix, église Notre-Dame-de-Roscudon. Réinvention du passé et ambition architecturale en contexte paroissial. Finistère: Congrès archéologique de France. pp. 243–259.
- Gatouillat, Françoise; Hérold, Michel (2005). "Pont-Croix. Eglise Notre-Dame de Roscudon". Les vitraux de Bretagne. Vol. Corpus Vitrearum / Recensement des vitraux anciens de la France (incorrect ed.). Rennes: Presses universitaires de Rennes. pp. 166–167.
- Tillet, Louise-Marie (1982). "Pont-Croix et son école". Bretagne romane. Vol. La Nuit des Temps. La Pierre-Qui-Vire: Zodiaque. pp. 199–206.

== See also ==
- Notre-Dame de Paris
- List of Gothic cathedrals in Europe
- Finistère
- Cistercians
