= Gilbert Le Bris =

French politician

Gilbert Le Bris (born March 3, 1949, in Concarneau) is a former member of the National Assembly of France. He represented the 8th constituency of the Finistère department from 2002 to 2017, and was a member of the Socialiste, radical, citoyen et divers gauche group.
