= Finistère =

Department of France

Finistère Penn-ar-Bed (Breton)
- Department
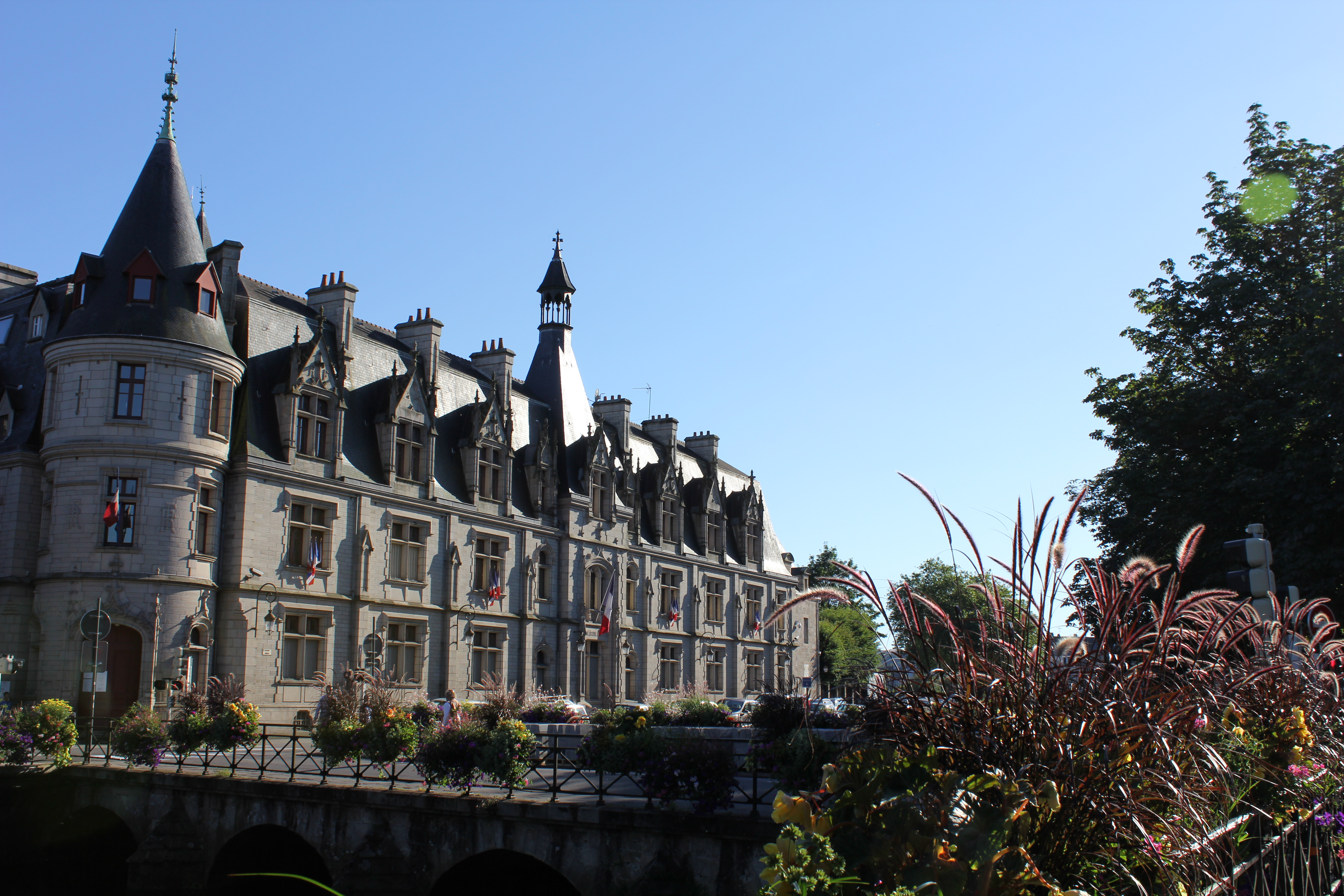
- Prefecture building of the Finistère department, in Quimper

- Coat of arms

- Location of Finistère in France
- Coordinates: 48°15′N 04°00′W
- Country: France
- Region: Brittany
- Prefecture: Quimper
- Subprefectures: Brest; Châteaulin; Morlaix

Government
  - President of the Departmental Council: Maël de Calan (DVD)

Area^{1}
  - Total: 6,733 km^{2} (2,600 sq mi)

Population (2023)
  - Total: 933,455
  - Rank: 24th
  - Density: 138.6/km^{2} (359.1/sq mi)
- Time zone: UTC+1 (CET)
  - Summer (DST): UTC+2 (CEST)
- ISO 3166 code: FR-29
- Department number: 29
- Largest city: Brest
- Arrondissements: 4
- Cantons: 27
- Communes: 277
- ^1 French Land Register data, which exclude estuaries, and lakes, ponds, and glaciers larger than 1 km^{2}

Finistère (/ˌfɪnɪˈstɛər/; French: [finistɛʁ]; Breton: Penn-ar-Bed [ˌpɛnarˈbeːt]) is a department of France in the extreme west of Brittany. Its prefecture is Quimper and its largest city is Brest. In 2023, it had a population of 933,455.

== History ==
Historical regions of Brittany

The present department consists of the historical region of Léon and parts of Cornouaille and Trégor, both parts of pre-revolutionary Brittany.

The name Finistère derives from the Latin Finis Terræ, meaning end of the earth. In England, a similar area is called Land's End. The Breton name for Finistère, Penn ar Bed, translates as "Head/End of the World" and is similar to the Cornish name for Land's End, Pedn an Wlas (Head/End of the land), and also Penfro (English: Pembroke) in Wales (pen = end, bro = land). Finistère is not to be confused with Fisterra in Galicia, Spain, which shares the same etymology.

The area of the department was part of the Province of Brittany before 1790.

== Geography ==
The largest population centre in Finistère is Brest. Other large towns in the department include Quimper (the capital), Concarneau, Morlaix, Carhaix, Quimperlé and Douarnenez. Finistère includes the island of Ushant (Eusa in Breton, Ouessant in French).

Finistère is the westernmost department of Metropolitan France and can also claim to be the "most coastal" department in Metropolitan France. Of its 277 communes, 117 are located on the coast (approximately 42% of the total number of communes). Its total coastline of approximately 1,250 km (776.71 mi) accounts for almost a quarter of the entire Brittany coast-line.

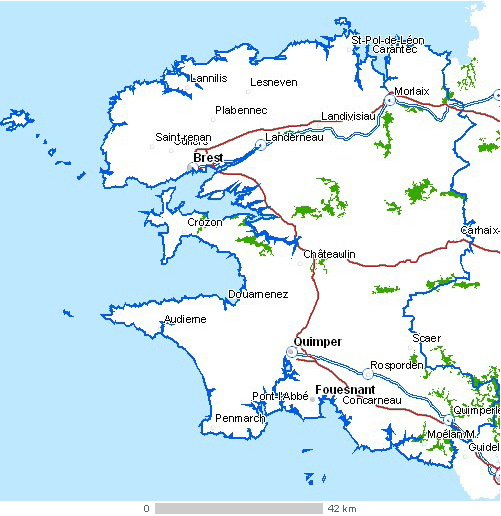
Map of Finistère

The abers, rugged fjord-like inlets on the north coast, are a notable feature of the landscape.

The westernmost point of continental France, known as the Pointe de Corsen, extends from the northwestern tip of Finistère. About 40 kilometres to the south (as the crow flies) is the slightly less westerly, but rugged and isolated, headland of Pointe du Raz.

=== Principal towns ===
The most populous commune is Brest; the prefecture Quimper is the second-most populous. As of 2023, there are 6 communes with more than 15,000 inhabitants:

| Commune | Population (2023) |
|---|---|
| Brest | 142,346 |
| Quimper | 64,385 |
| Concarneau | 20,845 |
| Landerneau | 16,363 |
| Guipavas | 15,538 |
| Morlaix | 15,194 |

== Demographics ==
Historical population

| Year | Pop. | ±% p.a. |
|---|---|---|
| 1801 | 439,046 | — |
| 1821 | 483,095 | +0.48% |
| 1831 | 524,396 | +0.82% |
| 1841 | 576,068 | +0.94% |
| 1851 | 617,710 | +0.70% |
| 1861 | 627,304 | +0.15% |
| 1876 | 666,106 | +0.40% |
| 1881 | 681,564 | +0.46% |
| 1891 | 727,012 | +0.65% |
| 1901 | 773,014 | +0.62% |
| 1921 | 752,514 | −0.13% |
| 1936 | 757,000 | +0.04% |

| Year | Pop. | ±% p.a. |
|---|---|---|
| 1946 | 724,735 | −0.43% |
| 1954 | 727,847 | +0.05% |
| 1962 | 749,558 | +0.37% |
| 1968 | 768,929 | +0.43% |
| 1975 | 804,088 | +0.64% |
| 1982 | 828,364 | +0.43% |
| 1990 | 838,687 | +0.15% |
| 1999 | 852,418 | +0.18% |
| 2007 | 885,906 | +0.48% |
| 2012 | 901,293 | +0.34% |
| 2017 | 909,028 | +0.17% |
| 2023 | 933,455 | +0.44% |

== Economy ==
Agriculture, fisheries, food processing and various related industries occupy an important place in Finistère's economy.

The military presence in Finistère (Île Longue nuclear submarine base and the Naval Air base of Lanvéoc-Poulmic), as well as military-related industries, such as the Brest headquarters of DCNS, employ a significant number of the département's population.

The port of Roscoff links Brittany by ferry with Ireland and Great Britain.

== Politics ==
=== Current National Assembly Representatives ===
| Constituency | Member | Party |
|---|---|---|
| Finistère's 1st constituency | Annaïg Le Meur | Renaissance |
| Finistère's 2nd constituency | Pierre-Yves Cadalen | La France Insoumise |
| Finistère's 3rd constituency | Didier Le Gac | Renaissance |
| Finistère's 4th constituency | Sandrine Le Feur | Renaissance |
| Finistère's 5th constituency | Graziella Melchior | Renaissance |
| Finistère's 6th constituency | Mélanie Thomin | Parti Socialiste |
| Finistère's 7th constituency | Liliane Tanguy | Renaissance |
| Finistère's 8th constituency | Erwan Balanant | MoDem |

== Culture ==
Finistère is the area where Breton survives most strongly as a spoken language. Breton-speaking schools are called Diwan, Divyezh and Dihun.

The Festival de Cornouaille, which takes place in Quimper, is a celebration of Breton music and traditions. One of the highlights of summer in Finistère is the "Festival des Vieilles Charrues" held in Carhaix-Plouguer. Major international stars attract tens of thousands of spectators.

The painter Raymond Wintz (1884–1956) featured many locations around Finistère.

Roland Doré was a sculptor who executed many of the calvaries in Finistère.

== Tourism ==
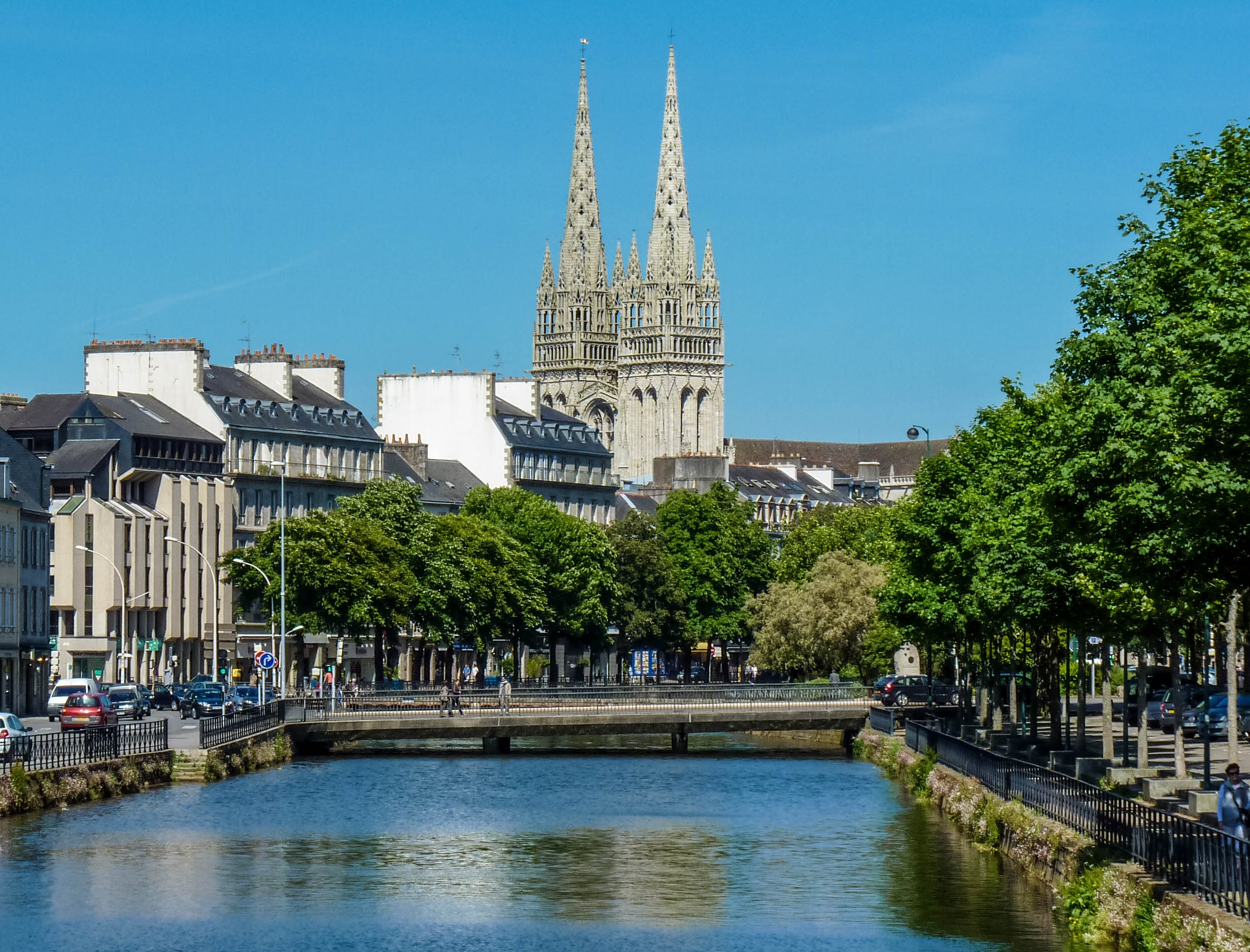
Quimper

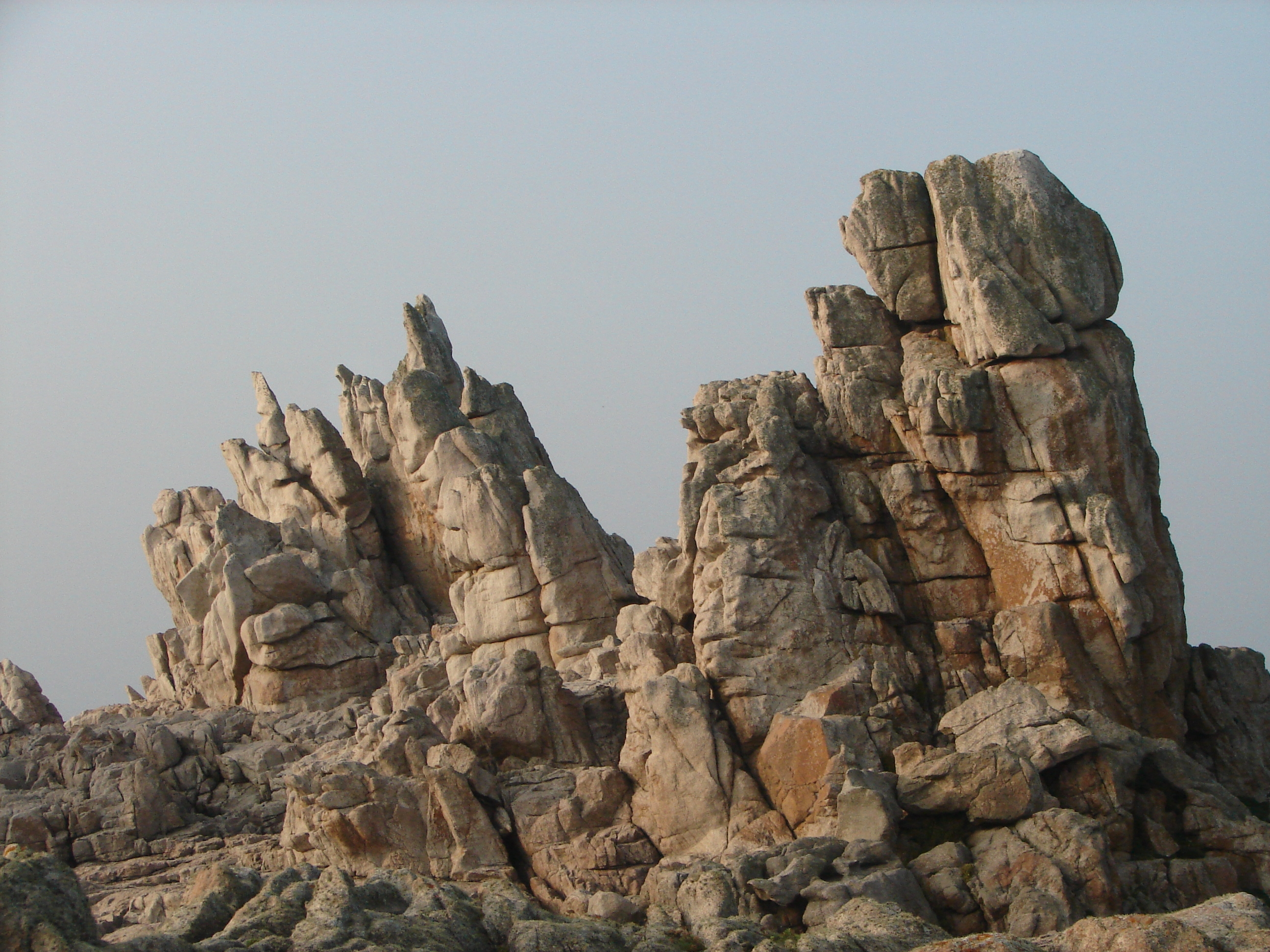
Granite rocks in Ouessant

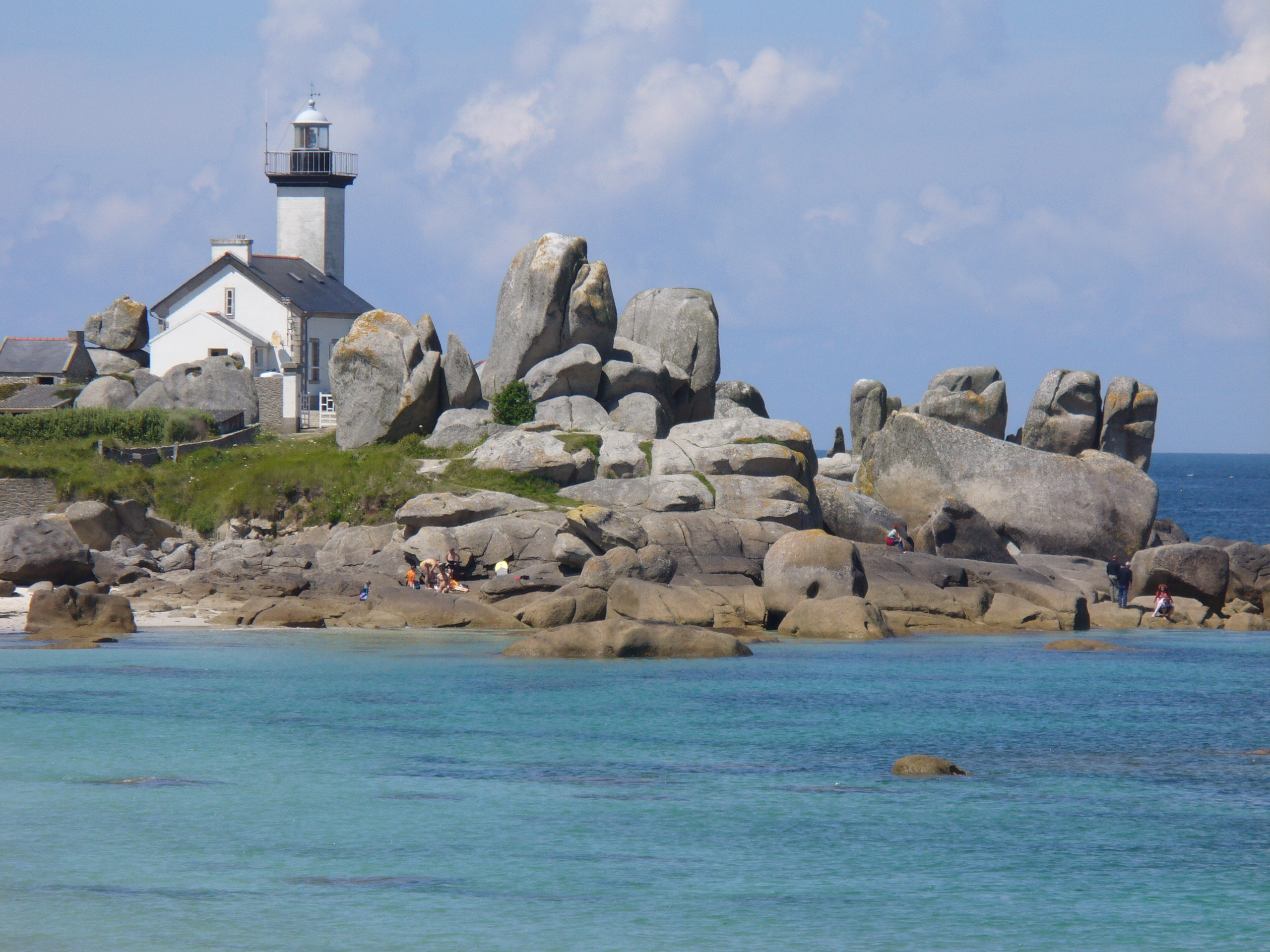
Pontusval lighthouse near Brignogan-Plages

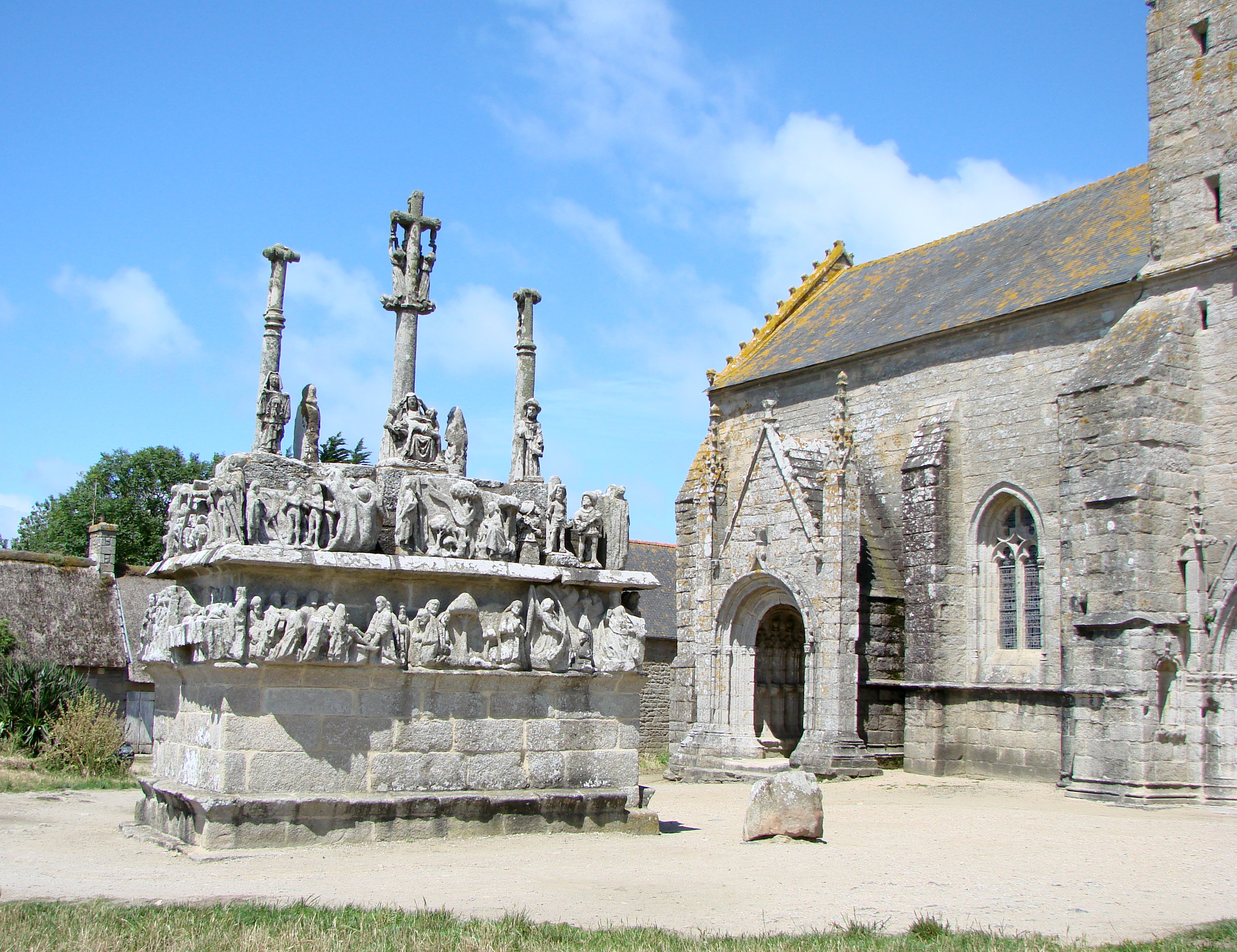
Calvary in Saint-Jean-Trolimon

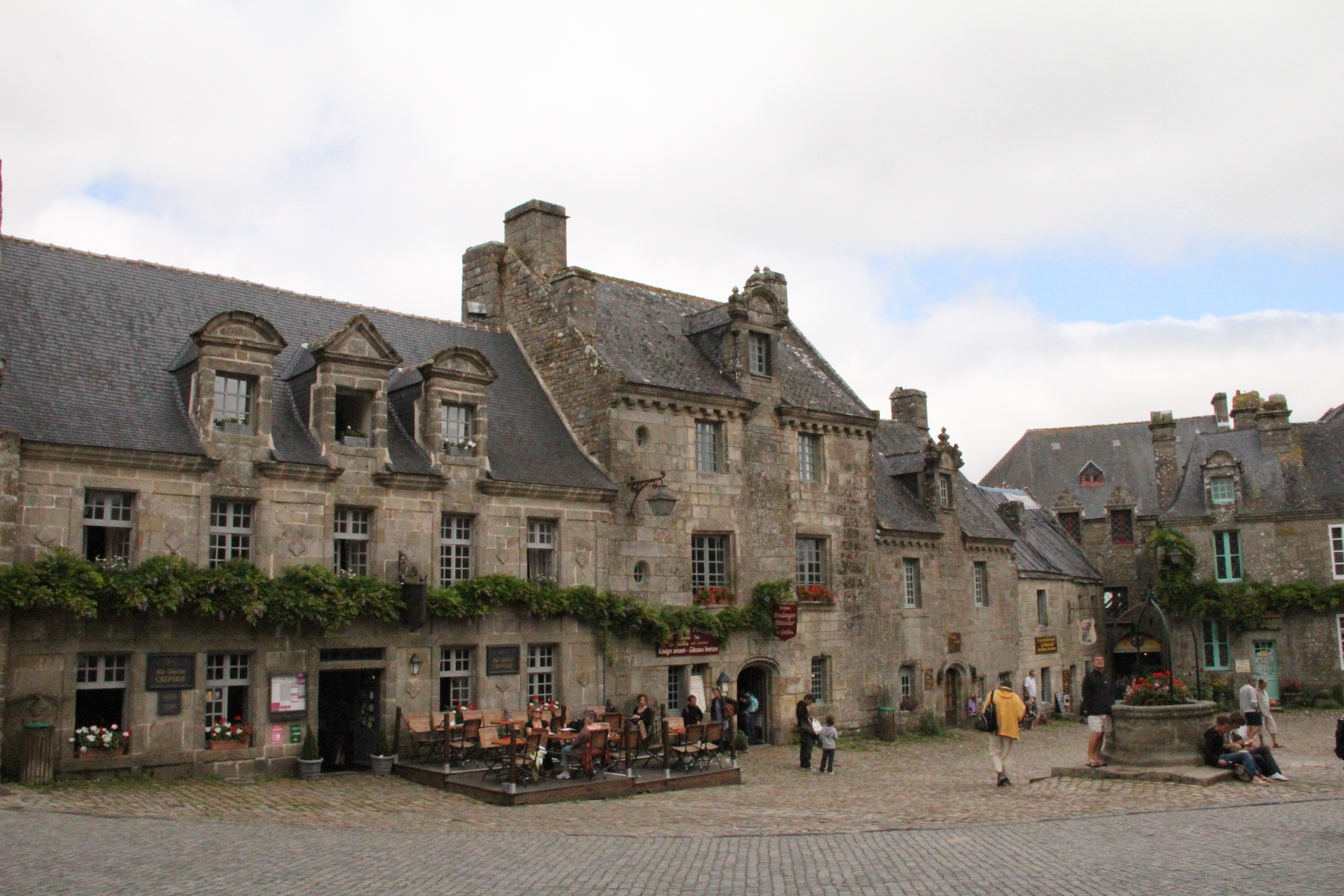
Locronan

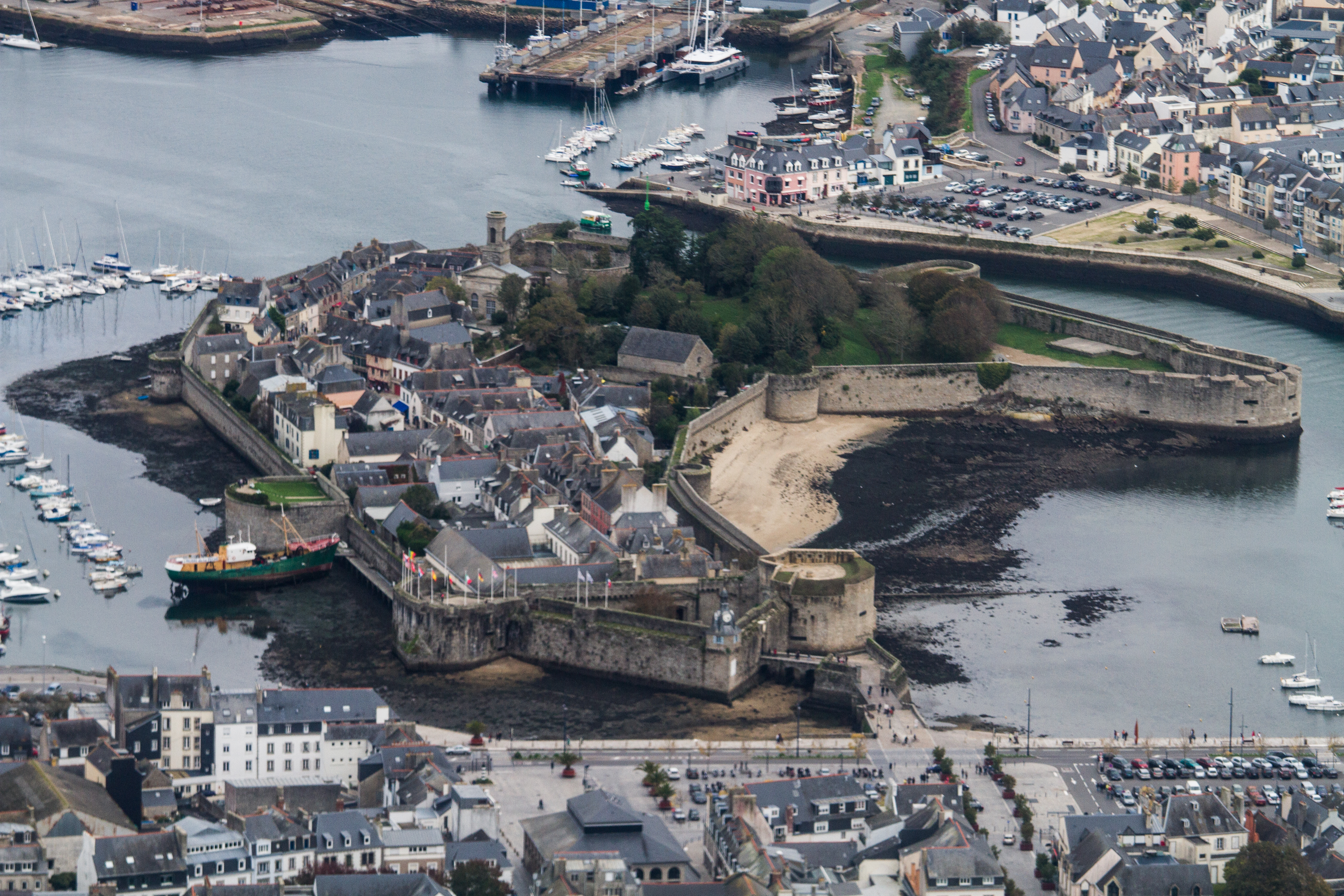
Concarneau

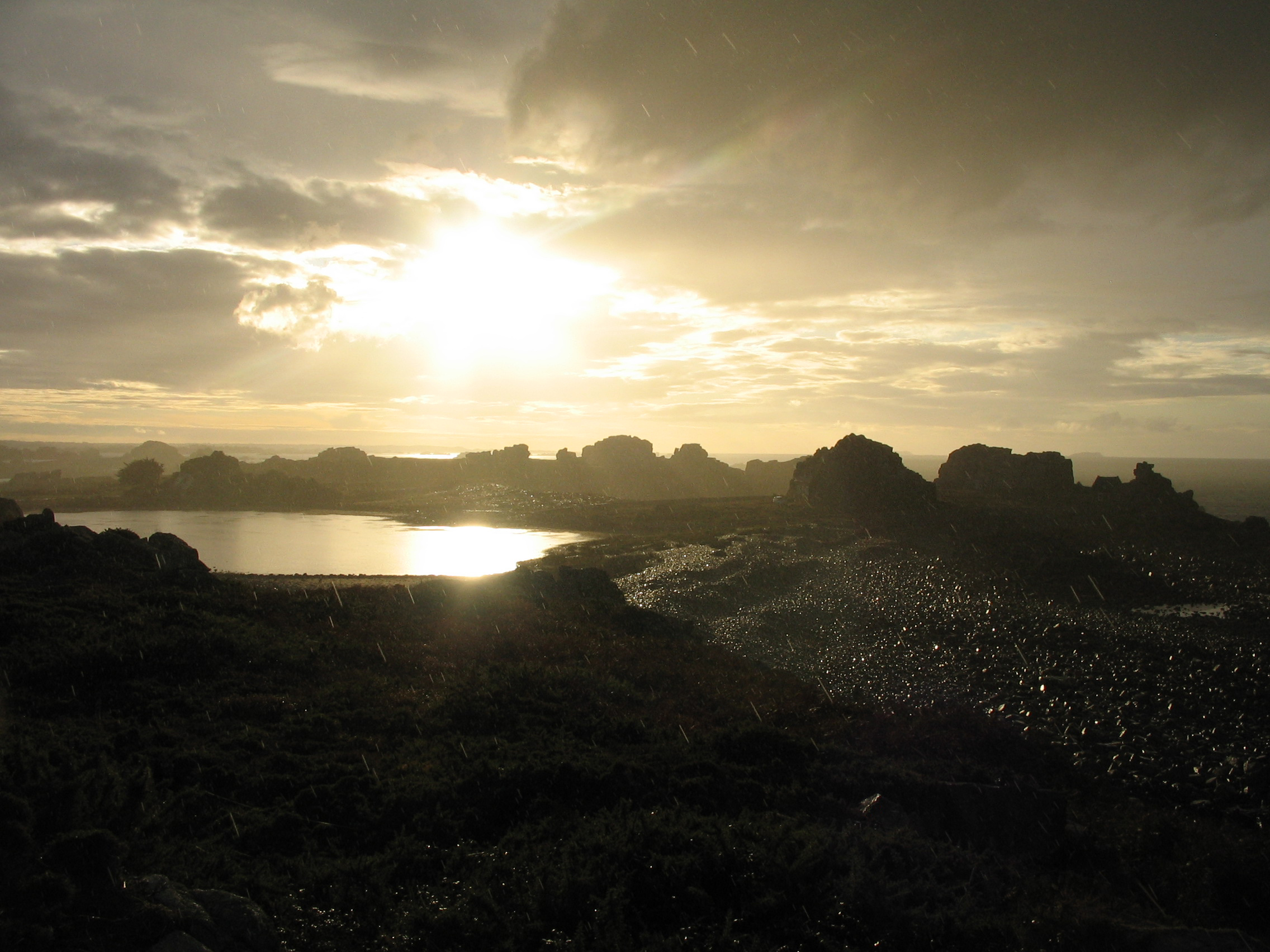
Pointe du Chateau, Plougrescant

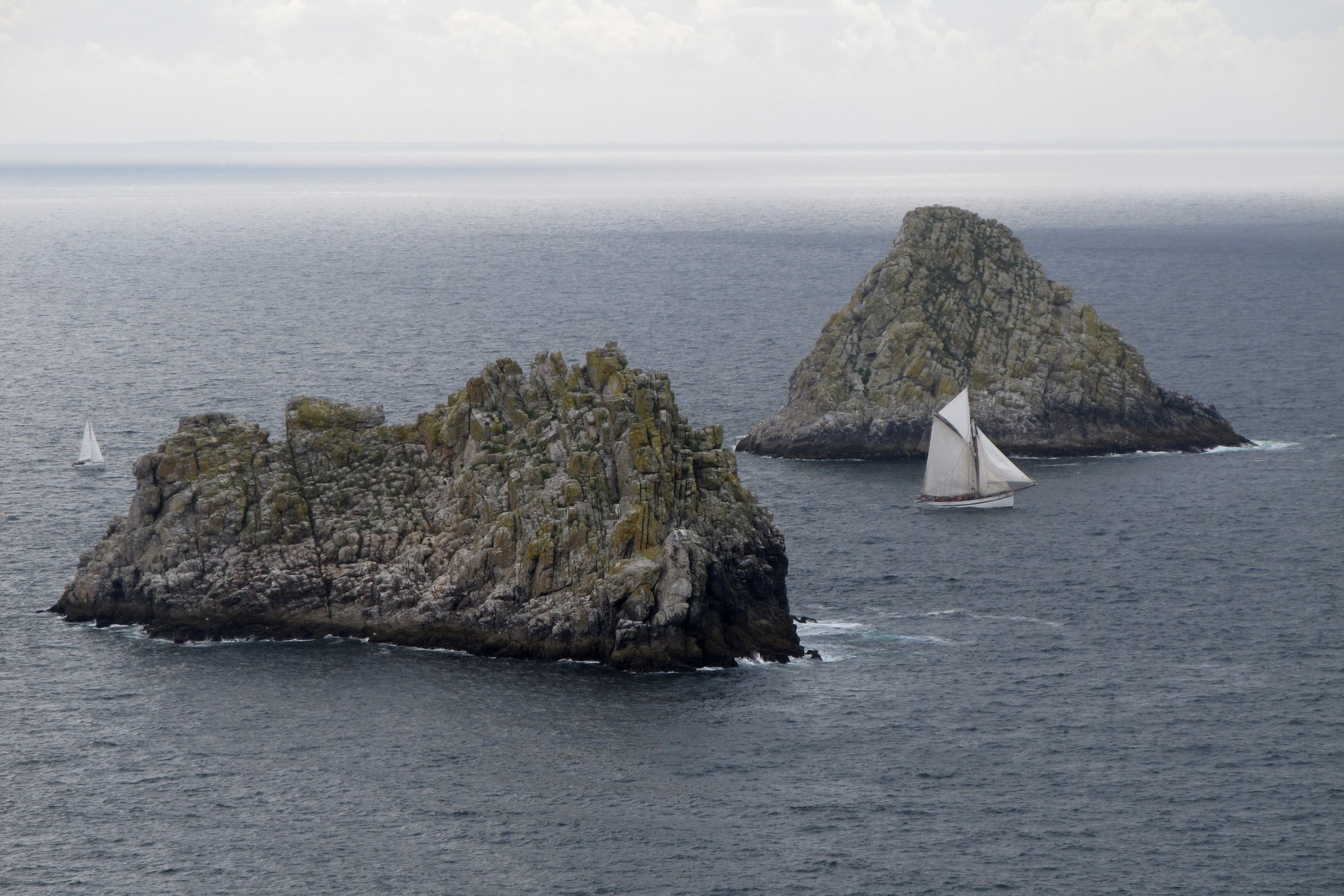
Pointe de Pen-Hir

== See also ==
- Cantons of the Finistère department
- Communes of the Finistère department
- Arrondissements of the Finistère department
- Ys
- Calvary at Saint-Herbot near Plonévez-du-Faou and the Chapelle Saint-Herbot.
- Notre Dame de Roscudon Church
