= 2017 The Republicans (France) leadership election =

French Republican Party leadership election, 2017

2017 The Republicans leadership election
- 10 December 2017
- Turnout: 42.46% ▼15.64%
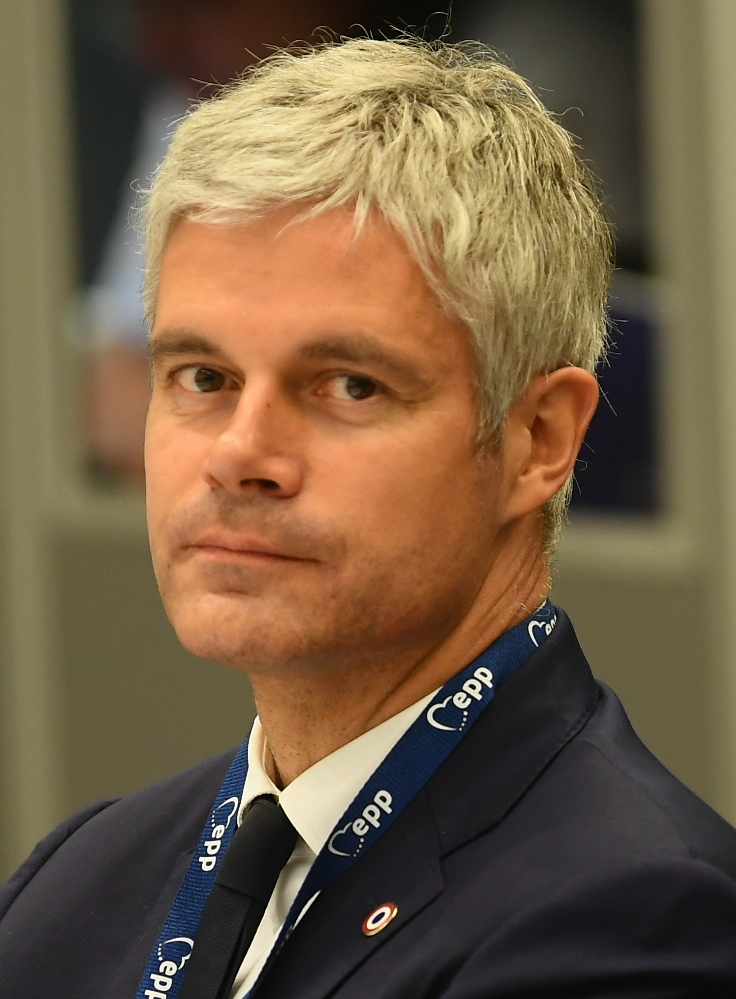

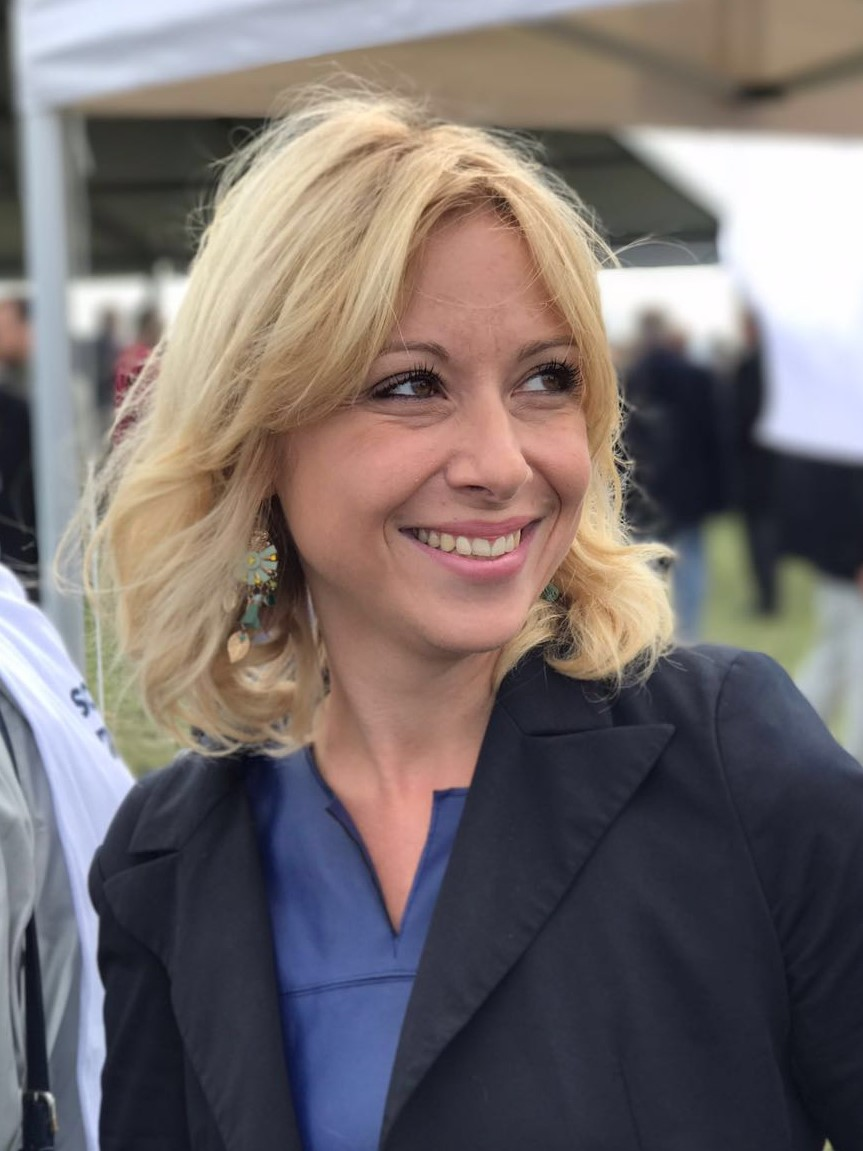

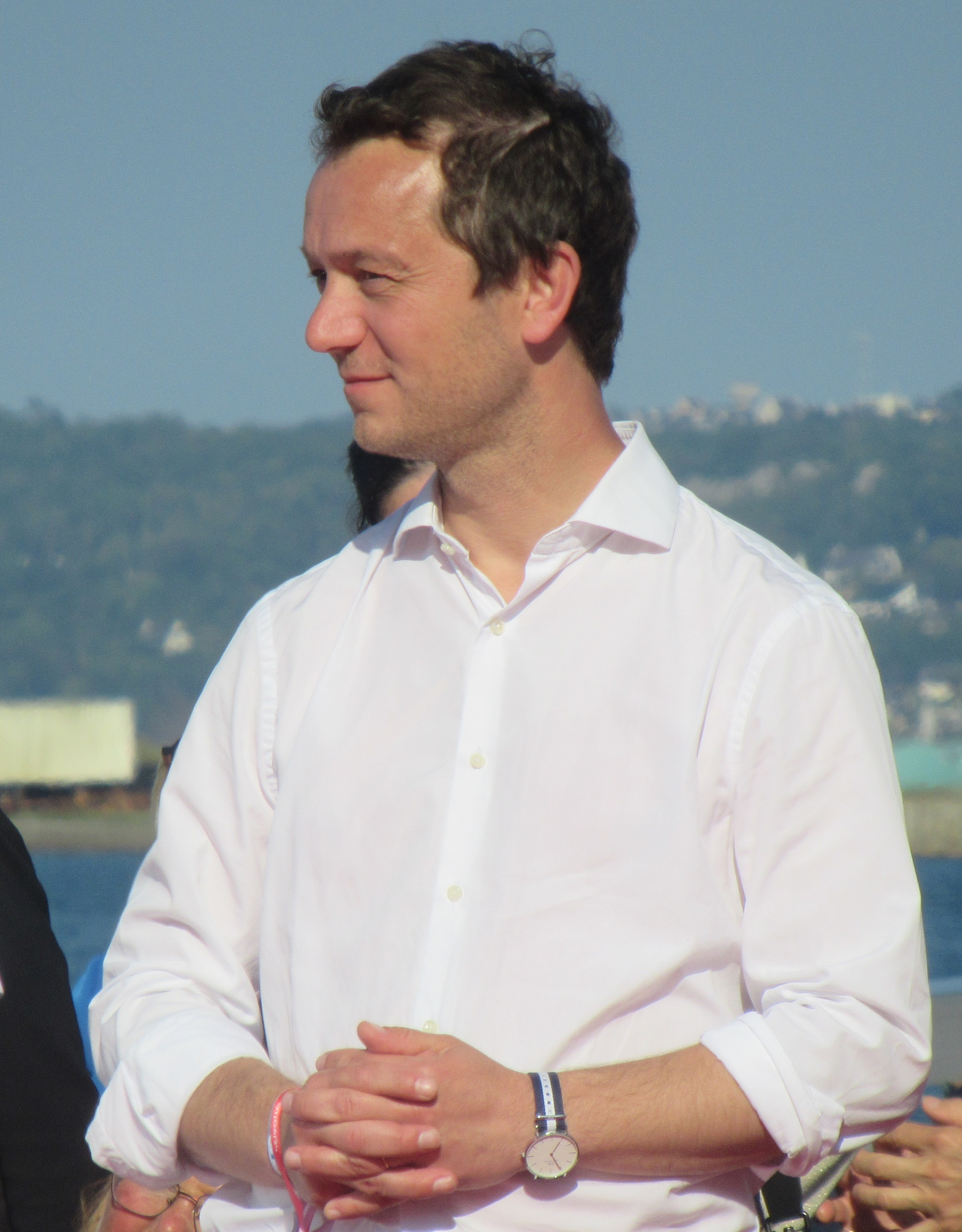
Nominee	Laurent Wauquiez	Florence Portelli	Maël de Calan
Party	LR	LR	LR
Popular vote	73,554	15,876	9,113
Percentage	74.64%	16.11%	9.25%
- Vote percentage for Wauquiez by department <65% 65–70% 70–75% 75–80% 80–85% >85%
President before election
Vacant
Elected President
Laurent Wauquiez

A leadership election for the presidency of The Republicans (LR) was held on 10 December 2017, the first since the refoundation of the party in 2015, before which it was known as the Union for a Popular Movement (UMP), and seventh overall including the UMP congresses.

The leadership election followed the 2017 presidential election, in which its candidate François Fillon, the party nominee after winning the 2016 presidential primary, was eliminated in the first round. The party suffered further losses in the subsequent legislative elections, and the appointment of several right-wing ministers to the government of newly elected president Emmanuel Macron led to a split between "constructive" personalities and hardliners within the party, culminating in the expulsion of six prominent supporters and members of the government from The Republicans.

With the presidency of the party officially vacant since Fillon won the primary in November 2016, the political bureau of the party scheduled a leadership election a leadership election for 10 December 2017, with a second round on 17 December if no candidate secured a majority of the vote in the first round.

In a single-round vote on 10 December 2017, Laurent Wauquiez was elected by a wide margin, securing 74.64% of votes with turnout of just under 100,000 members, with his opponents Florence Portelli and Maël de Calan posting only marginal scores. Wauquiez was the only major politician from the party to stand in the leadership election, which Xavier Bertrand and Valérie Pécresse declined to contest. Following the result, Bertrand, the president of the regional council of Hauts-de-France, announced his departure from the party, noting his disagreement with Wauquiez's hard-right line.

== Background ==
On 30 May 2015, the Union for a Popular Movement (UMP) was refounded as The Republicans (LR), an initiative of Nicolas Sarkozy preceding the 2016 presidential primary for the 2017 presidential election. Sarkozy presided over the party until 23 August 2016, when he declared his candidacy in the presidential primary, after which Laurent Wauquiez was appointed as interim president and Éric Woerth as general secretary of the party in accordance with its statutes. The presidency of the party became vacant on 29 November after the primary was won by François Fillon, who appointed Bernard Accoyer as general secretary and Wauquiez as 1st vice president.

In the first round of the 2017 presidential election, Fillon suffered a historic defeat, with the right eliminated in the first round for the first time in the history of the Fifth Republic amid "Penelopegate". In the subsequent legislative elections, the right suffered further losses, losing nearly a hundred deputies, its worst score in the history of the Fifth Republic.

Following the election of Emmanuel Macron as president under the banner of En Marche! and the subsequent appointment of three right-wing personalities in prominent posts in the newly formed government – Édouard Philippe as Prime Minister, Bruno Le Maire as French Ministry for the Economy and Finance, and Gérald Darmanin as Minister of Public Action and Accounts – a parliamentary group including LR dissidents supportive of the government, "The Constructives", was formed in the National Assembly, separate from the existing LR group. Many LR figures called for the exclusion of the three ministers as well as Sébastien Lecornu, Thierry Solère, and Franck Riester, from the party. On 11 July, Accoyer announced that a "special commission" would "collect the explanations" of the six, postponing the exclusion decision until the autumn. On 24 October, Le Maire confirmed that he left The Republicans for La République En Marche. Darmamin, Lecornu, Solère, and Riester were formally excluded by the political bureau of the party on 31 October; Philippe was not formally excluded due to juridicial reasons, though the party noted his departure. On 25 November, Darmamin, Lecornu, and Solère announced they joined La République En Marche, while Riester founded a new centre-right party, Agir.

On 11 July, the political bureau of The Republicans agreed to hold a leadership election for the new president of the party on 10 and 17 December, with nominations closing on 11 October. Voting was held for 24 hours starting from 20:00 CET on 9 December in order to allow members of the party to vote regardless of their location, and be held in the same manner a week later if a second round was necessary.

== Candidates ==
Candidates for the presidency of The Republicans were required to submit applications for their candidacies with sponsorships to the High Authority of the party by 11 October 2017. To be considered valid, applications required the sponsorship of at least 1% of party adherents (i.e., a minimum of 2,347) within at least 15 different departmental federations, without more than a fifth of sponsors originating from any single federation, in addition to at least 5% of LR parliamentarians in the deputies, senators, or MEPs (i.e., at least 13 parliamentarians). The list of official candidates was released by the High Authority on 26 October after the validation of sponsorships, marking the beginning of the official campaign, which ended at midnight on 8 December; in the event that a second round was needed, the official campaign would have continued from 11 to 15 December.

=== Validated ===
Candidate name and age (Note: Age calculated as of the date of validation of candidacies on 26 October 2017)		Political office(s)	Details
Maël de Calan (37)	Maël de Calan	Departmental councillor of Finistère (since 2015); Municipal councillor of Roscoff (since 2014)	The departmental councillor of Finistère, president of the LR federation of Finistère, municipal councillor of Roscoff, and former spokesperson for Alain Juppé declared his candidacy on 5 September. De Calan supported Juppé during the 2016 primary; European, liberal on the economy, and moderately conservative on societal issues, he represented the "moderate right" in the leadership election after the decisions of Xavier Bertrand and Valérie Pécresse not to run left open a political space on the centre-right. He outmaneuvered Agnès Le Brun to secure the LR investiture in Finistère's 4th constituency for the 2017 legislative election, but narrowly lost to La République En Marche! (REM) candidate Sandrine Le Feur in the second round. With regard to "The Constructives", de Calan defended a nuanced position, claiming that they were simply no longer members of the party and warned against using a "sectarian" exclusion procedure.
Florence Portelli (39)	Florence Portelli	Mayor of Taverny (since 2014); Regional councillor of Île-de-France (since 2015)	The mayor of Taverny, regional councillor of Île-de-France, national secretary for culture of The Republicans, and former spokesman for François Fillon declared her candidacy on 29 August. Having supported Fillon during the 2012 leadership election, she was selected as a spokesperson for his 2017 presidential campaign after being elected as a regional councillor of Île-de-France in the 2015 elections, but chose not to attend his 5 March rally at the Trocadéro, disgusted by anti-judge and anti-journalist chants. The daughter of senator Hugues Portelli, she militated "for the right to recover its pride", to "return to activists the place that they should have in the party", and "a refoundation, a democratized functioning, a radical change to statutes and clarification of the ideological line of the party". She excluded any possibility of cooperating with the extreme right, argued for the need to "reinforce" immigration control, and supported the definitive exclusion of LR members of "The Constructives", saying they had "excluded themselves", but invited those who hoped that its creation would propel the right to reform "to return to the fold," believing them mistaken.
Laurent Wauquiez (42)	Laurent Wauquiez	President of the regional council of Auvergne-Rhône-Alpes (since 2016); 1st vice president of The Republicans (since 2015) Other offices: President of The Republicans (interim) in 2016; General secretary of the Union for a Popular Movement, later The Republicans, from 2014 to 2015; Deputy for Haute-Loire's 1st constituency from 2012 to 2017; Minister for Higher Education and Research from 2011 to 2012; Minister in charge of European Affairs from 2010 to 2011; Secretary of State in charge of Employment from 2008 to 2010; Secretary of State attached to the Prime Minister and Government Spokesman; Mayor of Le Puy-en-Velay from 2008 to 2016; Deputy for Haute-Loire's 1st constituency from 2004 to 2007	The president of the regional council of Auvergne-Rhône-Alpes and 1st vice president of The Republicans declared his candidacy on 31 August. Popular with the activist base of the party, Wauquiez's identitarian views echo those of Nicolas Sarkozy. Despite being detested by many in the party leadership, Wauquiez's hard-right views, emphasizing the themes of immigration, identity, and Islamism, and appeals for a "right that is really right", gained him the backing of the party's supporters. Though he repeatedly promised that he would not seek an alliance with the National Front (FN), his refusal to support Emmanuel Macron against Marine Le Pen in the second round of the presidential election reinforced fears that he might lead the party into an alliance with the FN. Wauquiez was further castigated for his relationship with Sens Commun – a political association linked to The Republicans related to La Manif Pour Tous, which spearheaded the opposition to the legalization of same-sex marriage of France – with concerns about the group's openness to working with the FN and the extreme right. Wauquiez denounced "The Constructives" as "traitors" who "have nothing left to do" in the party, but also hoped to unite the sensibilities of the right.

=== Invalidated ===
- Daniel Fasquelle, deputy for Pas-de-Calais's 4th constituency, president of the LR federation of Pas-de-Calais, and vice president of the Economic Affairs Committee in the National Assembly; declared candidacy on 26 August, deemed ineligible because of insufficient sponsorships on 26 October

=== Renounced ===
- Envisaged candidacies

- Xavier Bertrand, president of the regional council of Hauts-de-France; considered candidacy before renouncing on 25 June
- Roger Karoutchi, senator for Hauts-de-Seine; considered candidacy before renouncing and announcing sponsorship of Wauquiez's candidacy on 28 September
- Valérie Pécresse, president of the regional council of Île-de-France; announced that she would not run on 9 July
- Bruno Retailleau, president of The Republicans group in the Senate; considered the possibility on 11 July but did not take further action

- Candidacies announced but later aborted

- Julien Aubert, deputy for Vaucluse's 5th constituency; declared candidacy on 3 September, but renounced on 11 October after failing to secure enough sponsorships (claimed 13 parliamentarians and 2,211 adherents)
- Laurence Sailliet, member of the political bureau of the party; declared candidacy on 9 July, but renounced on 9 October after failing to secure enough sponsorships (claimed 14 parliamentarians and 1,800 adherents)

== Opinion polling ==
Because the number of paying members of the party constitutes only a small proportion of the French population, no surveys have explicitly surveyed voting intentions. However, surveys have been conducted among all French, including supporters of The Republicans and the right and centre, on the candidate they would support in the leadership election.

Among LR supporters

Polling firm	Fieldwork date	Sample size	Laurent Wauquiez	Florence Portelli	Maël de Calan	Daniel Fasquelle	No response
Election	9–10 Dec 2017	–	74.64%	16.11%	9.25%	–	–
Odoxa	6–7 Dec 2017	113	62%	20%	14%	–	4%
Odoxa	11–12 Oct 2017	133	78%	14%	2%	4%	2%

Among all French

Polling firm	Fieldwork date	Sample size	Laurent Wauquiez	Florence Portelli	Maël de Calan	Daniel Fasquelle	No response
Odoxa	6–7 Dec 2017	986	40%	32%	19%	–	9%
Odoxa	11–12 Oct 2017	992	44%	29%	10%	7%	10%

=== Hypothetical polling ===
Among LR supporters

Polling firm	Fieldwork date	Sample size	François Baroin	Xavier Bertrand	Laurent Wauquiez	Valérie Pécresse	None of these
Harris Interactive	19 Jun 2017	–	48%	19%	10%	9%	14%

Among right/centre supporters

Polling firm	Fieldwork date	Sample size	François Baroin	Xavier Bertrand	Laurent Wauquiez	Valérie Pécresse	None of these
Harris Interactive	19 Jun 2017	–	40%	20%	13%	8%	19%

Among all French

Polling firm	Fieldwork date	Sample size	François Baroin	Xavier Bertrand	Laurent Wauquiez	Valérie Pécresse	None of these
Harris Interactive	19 Jun 2017	1,021	19%	15%	7%	6%	53%

== Results ==
Candidate	First round	
Candidate	Votes	%
Laurent Wauquiez	73,554	74.64
Florence Portelli	15,876	16.11
Maël de Calan	9,113	9.25
Total	98,543	100.00
Valid votes	98,543	98.94
Blank votes	1,054	1.06
Turnout	99,597	42.46
Abstentions	134,959	57.54
Registered voters	234,556	
Source: The Republicans

=== By department ===
Department	Laurent Wauquiez		Florence Portelli		Maël de Calan		Votes	Members	%
Department	#	%	#	%	#	%	Votes	Members	%
Ain	777	87.01	77	8.62	39	4.37	899	1,875	47.95
Aisne	500	69.06	124	17.13	100	13.81	735	2,255	32.59
Allier	488	83.85	54	9.28	40	6.87	586	1,083	54.11
Alpes-de-Haute-Provence	221	80.66	36	13.14	17	6.20	278	685	40.58
Hautes-Alpes	176	82.24	30	14.02	8	3.74	214	523	40.92
Alpes-Maritimes	3,736	79.22	628	13.32	352	7.46	4,766	10,491	45.43
Ardèche	497	89.23	40	7.18	20	3.59	561	949	59.11
Ardennes	183	72.91	52	20.72	16	6.37	257	689	37.30
Ariège	139	78.53	24	13.56	14	7.91	180	379	47.49
Aube	287	69.66	98	23.79	27	6.55	421	1,163	36.20
Aude	428	80.91	67	12.67	34	6.43	534	1,197	44.61
Aveyron	211	83.40	33	13.04	9	3.56	257	641	40.09
Bouches-du-Rhône	3,585	83.35	510	11.86	206	4.79	4,357	10,509	41.46
Calvados	627	69.59	188	20.87	86	9.54	913	2,018	45.24
Cantal	182	91.46	5	2.51	12	6.03	200	371	53.91
Charente	244	72.62	37	11.01	55	16.37	338	788	42.89
Charente-Maritime	821	70.11	179	15.29	171	14.60	1,184	2,658	44.54
Cher	326	74.94	64	14.71	45	10.34	436	1,004	43.43
Corrèze	314	75.12	58	13.88	46	11.00	422	939	44.94
Côte-d'Or	618	73.57	130	15.48	92	10.95	852	1,938	43.96
Côtes-d'Armor	406	70.86	73	12.74	94	16.40	577	1,205	47.88
Creuse	129	83.77	18	11.69	7	4.55	154	371	41.51
Dordogne	458	77.36	77	13.01	57	9.63	597	1,409	42.37
Doubs	745	82.69	113	12.54	43	4.77	911	2,101	43.36
Drôme	639	82.88	91	11.80	41	5.32	773	1,699	45.50
Eure	428	75.09	100	17.54	42	7.37	580	1,557	37.25
Eure-et-Loir	448	79.43	72	12.77	44	7.80	572	1,268	45.11
Finistère	467	52.53	129	14.51	293	32.96	891	1,763	50.54
Corse-du-Sud	257	80.06	49	15.26	15	4.67	323	853	37.87
Haute-Corse	259	85.76	37	12.25	6	1.99	302	709	42.60
Gard	1,169	80.79	214	14.79	64	4.42	1,469	2,981	49.28
Haute-Garonne	1,396	75.58	299	16.19	152	8.23	1,863	3,856	48.31
Gers	195	74.71	45	17.24	21	8.05	261	548	47.63
Gironde	1,624	65.86	314	12.73	528	21.41	2,484	5,604	44.33
Hérault	1,421	79.83	246	13.82	113	6.35	1,798	3,928	45.77
Ille-et-Vilaine	451	61.11	138	18.70	149	20.19	750	1,815	41.32
Indre	217	72.33	59	19.67	24	8.00	303	639	47.42
Indre-et-Loire	657	69.30	212	22.36	79	8.33	963	2,217	43.44
Isère	1,431	85.28	179	10.67	68	4.05	1,690	3,422	49.39
Jura	357	78.12	43	9.41	57	12.47	461	1,084	42.53
Landes	367	71.68	83	16.21	62	12.11	521	1,180	44.15
Loir-et-Cher	326	77.43	73	17.34	22	5.23	423	834	50.72
Loire	881	87.75	75	7.47	48	4.78	1,015	1,825	55.62
Haute-Loire	575	97.96	7	1.19	5	0.85	587	844	69.55
Loire-Atlantique	1,096	68.80	366	22.98	131	8.22	1,612	3,999	40.31
Loiret	563	75.27	124	16.58	61	8.16	760	1,719	44.21
Lot	185	85.25	22	10.14	10	4.61	218	426	51.17
Lot-et-Garonne	338	76.82	48	10.91	54	12.27	444	1,085	40.92
Lozère	119	82.07	14	9.66	12	8.28	145	283	51.24
Maine-et-Loire	556	70.74	166	21.12	64	8.14	790	1,825	43.29
Manche	363	74.23	82	16.77	44	9.00	493	1,089	45.27
Marne	434	69.44	107	17.12	84	13.44	639	1,686	37.90
Haute-Marne	154	69.37	44	19.82	24	10.81	222	561	39.57
Mayenne	190	78.19	37	15.23	16	6.58	249	541	46.03
Meurthe-et-Moselle	646	79.75	121	14.94	43	5.31	816	1,760	46.36
Meuse	113	65.32	51	29.48	9	5.20	176	472	37.29
Morbihan	531	64.44	168	20.39	125	15.17	834	1,734	48.10
Moselle	670	80.43	93	11.16	70	8.40	842	2,282	36.90
Nièvre	156	74.29	35	16.67	19	9.05	212	478	44.35
Nord	1,418	71.15	377	18.92	198	9.93	2,024	5,149	39.31
Oise	863	70.91	263	21.61	91	7.48	1,232	3,114	39.56
Orne	229	63.26	97	26.80	36	9.94	369	874	42.22
Pas-de-Calais	832	72.66	216	18.86	97	8.47	1,170	2,681	43.64
Puy-de-Dôme	698	86.71	58	7.20	49	6.09	808	1,500	53.87
Pyrénées-Atlantiques	943	77.81	172	14.19	97	8.00	1,217	2,548	47.76
Hautes-Pyrénées	235	67.53	97	27.87	16	4.60	349	829	42.10
Pyrénées-Orientales	896	84.13	124	11.64	45	4.23	1,073	2,377	45.14
Bas-Rhin	701	73.56	150	15.74	102	10.70	969	2,576	37.62
Haut-Rhin	533	70.88	157	20.88	62	8.24	765	1,862	41.08
Rhône	2,783	84.05	334	10.09	194	5.86	3,328	6,770	49.16
Haute-Saône	309	82.18	43	11.44	24	6.38	381	884	43.10
Saône-et-Loire	587	72.65	121	14.98	100	12.38	814	1,621	50.22
Sarthe	312	55.91	203	36.38	43	7.71	567	1,293	43.85
Savoie	424	79.70	69	12.97	39	7.33	536	1,206	44.44
Haute-Savoie	965	77.89	189	15.25	85	6.86	1,253	2,819	44.45
Paris	3,935	66.07	1,210	20.32	811	13.62	6,010	17,033	35.28
Seine-Maritime	797	66.86	207	17.37	188	15.77	1,203	2,939	40.93
Seine-et-Marne	1,588	75.44	358	17.01	159	7.55	2,128	4,866	43.73
Yvelines	2,427	67.95	760	21.28	385	10.78	3,606	8,413	42.86
Deux-Sèvres	182	65.47	46	16.55	50	17.99	283	745	37.99
Somme	435	74.74	91	15.64	56	9.62	593	1,386	42.78
Tarn	446	86.10	47	9.07	25	4.83	523	1,104	47.37
Tarn-et-Garonne	345	80.61	63	14.72	20	4.67	428	782	54.73
Var	2,340	81.48	378	13.16	154	5.36	2,897	6,871	42.16
Vaucluse	832	80.00	139	13.37	69	6.63	1,056	2,218	47.61
Vendée	508	68.37	159	21.40	76	10.23	759	1,729	43.90
Vienne	303	66.45	68	14.91	85	18.64	457	1,061	43.07
Haute-Vienne	460	84.56	44	8.09	40	7.35	551	1,103	49.95
Vosges	341	73.18	89	19.10	36	7.73	470	1,091	43.08
Yonne	399	76.58	68	13.05	54	10.36	524	1,071	48.93
Territoire de Belfort	588	82.47	95	13.32	30	4.21	725	1,740	41.67
Essonne	1,139	71.59	313	19.67	139	8.74	1,617	3,615	44.73
Hauts-de-Seine	3,241	67.34	992	20.61	580	12.05	4,863	13,137	37.02
Seine-Saint-Denis	726	73.11	193	19.44	74	7.45	1,007	2,423	41.56
Val-de-Marne	1,441	71.44	356	17.65	220	10.91	2,049	4,499	45.54
Val-d'Oise	989	58.49	520	30.75	182	10.76	1,706	3,724	45.81
Guadeloupe	132	78.11	29	17.16	8	4.73	169	482	35.06
Martinique	92	73.02	26	20.63	8	6.35	127	474	26.79
French Guiana	16	59.26	9	33.33	2	7.41	27	146	18.49
Réunion	401	82.68	55	11.34	29	5.98	495	1,445	34.26
Mayotte	114	85.07	8	5.97	12	8.96	134	893	15.01
New Caledonia	188	83.19	30	13.27	8	3.54	229	1,792	12.78
French residents overseas	624	65.27	188	19.67	144	15.06	967	3,561	27.16
Other departments (Note: "Other departments" lists the combined totals of Saint Pierre and Miquelon, Saint Barthélemy, Saint Martin, Wallis and Futuna, and French Polynesia for purposes of secrecy of votes cast by party members in those departments.)	20	68.97	7	24.14	2	6.90	29	303	9.57
Total	73,554	74.64	15,876	16.11	9,113	9.25	99,597	234,556	42.46
Source: The Republicans

== Aftermath ==
On 11 December 2017, following the election of Laurent Wauquiez as president of the party, Xavier Bertrand, president of the regional council of Hauts-de-France, announced that he would "definitively quit" The Republicans. Appearing on France 2, he stated that he no longer recognized his party and therefore decided to leave it the evening of the election, having already been critical of Wauquiez's failure to clearly commit against the extreme-right and engagement with the FN. Bertrand said that he did not intend to join or create a political party, adding that "my party is the Hauts-de-France region". Wauquiez's victory was met with relative silence among political personalities of the moderate right, with no acknowledgement or congratulation to Valérie Pécresse and Christian Estrosi silent, and Alain Juppé merely noting that the election produced a "victory without surprise". Prior to the election, Jean-Christophe Lagarde, president of the Union of Democrats and Independents (UDI), stated that there would no longer be an alliance between the two parties in the case of a Wauquiez victory.

On 13 December, Wauquiez unveiled his selections for the leadership of the party, with Virginie Calmels, Guillaume Peltier, and Damien Abad appointed as vice presidents, Annie Genevard appointed as secretary general, in addition to six deputy secretaries general and spokespersons. Wauquiez will meet with Pécresse later in the week.

== See also ==
- The Republicans (France) presidential primary, 2016
- Aubervilliers Congress
