= 2024 French legislative election in Finistère =

Following the first round of the 2024 French legislative election on 30 June 2024, runoff elections in each constituency where no candidate received a vote share greater than 50 percent were scheduled for 7 July. Candidates permitted to stand in the runoff elections needed to either come in first or second place in the first round or achieve more than 12.5 percent of the votes of the entire electorate (as opposed to 12.5 percent of the vote share due to low turnout).

== Finistère ==
=== 1st constituency ===
| Candidate | Party or alliance | | First round | | Second round | |
| Candidate | Party or alliance | | Votes | % | Votes | % |
|---|---|---|---|---|---|---|
| Annaïg Le Meur | Ensemble | Renaissance | 22,422 | 33.00 | 27,066 | 39.70 |
| Grégory Lebert | New Popular Front | The Ecologists | 22,303 | 32.83 | 24,096 | 35.34 |
| Christel Hénaff | National Rally | | 16,083 | 23.67 | 17,015 | 24.96 |
| Alain Le Grand | The Republicans | | 5,652 | 8.32 | | |
| Serge Hardy | Far-left | Lutte Ouvrière | 858 | 1.26 | | |
| Salomé Moyal | Reconquête | | 620 | 0.91 | | |
| Total | | | 67,938 | 100.00 | 68,177 | 100.00 |
| Valid votes | | | 67,938 | 97.63 | 68,177 | 97.30 |
| Invalid votes | | | 495 | 0.71 | 545 | 0.78 |
| Blank votes | | | 1,156 | 1.66 | 1,347 | 1.92 |
| Total votes | | | 69,589 | 100.00 | 70,069 | 100.00 |
| Registered voters/turnout | | | 92,336 | 75.36 | 92,349 | 75.87 |

=== 2nd constituency ===
| Candidate | Party or alliance | | First round | | Second round | |
| Candidate | Party or alliance | | Votes | % | Votes | % |
|---|---|---|---|---|---|---|
| Pierre-Yves Cadalen | New Popular Front | La France Insoumise | 18,850 | 35.28 | 22,110 | 41.01 |
| Denis Kervella | National Rally | | 12,065 | 22.58 | 12,567 | 23.31 |
| Jean-Charles Larsonneur | Miscellaneous centre | Renaissance (Note: Dissident that ran without the support of Ensemble) | 9,874 | 18.48 | 19,239 | 35.68 |
| Tristan Bréhier | Ensemble | Renaissance | 9,105 | 17.04 | | |
| Françoise Houard | The Republicans | | 1,444 | 2.70 | | |
| Geneviève Henry | Ecologists | Independent | 1,131 | 2.12 | | |
| Alain Rousseau | Reconquête | | 373 | 0.70 | | |
| Rémy Collard | Far-left | Lutte Ouvrière | 357 | 0.67 | | |
| Melvyn Hita | Far-left | Independent | 172 | 0.32 | | |
| Martial Koffi | Far-right | Independent | 55 | 0.10 | | |
| Total | | | 53,426 | 100.00 | 53,916 | 100.00 |
| Valid votes | | | 53,426 | 97.93 | 53,916 | 97.91 |
| Invalid votes | | | 56 | 0.10 | 45 | 0.08 |
| Blank votes | | | 1,075 | 1.97 | 1,105 | 2.01 |
| Total votes | | | 54,557 | 100.00 | 55,066 | 100.00 |
| Registered voters/turnout | | | 78,166 | 69.80 | 78,185 | 70.43 |

=== 3rd constituency ===
| Candidate | Party or alliance | | First round | | Second round | |
| Candidate | Party or alliance | | Votes | % | Votes | % |
|---|---|---|---|---|---|---|
| Didier Le Gac | Ensemble | Renaissance | 26,139 | 38.92 | 44,449 | 69.13 |
| Martine Donval | National Rally | | 18,627 | 27.74 | 19,848 | 30.87 |
| Pierre Smolarz | New Popular Front | La France Insoumise | 18,074 | 26.91 | | |
| Hélène Fave | Regionalists | Independent | 1,808 | 2.69 | | |
| Marie-Louise Thomas | Sovereigntist right | Debout la France | 1,050 | 1.56 | | |
| Matthieu Muller | Far-left | Lutte Ouvrière | 742 | 1.10 | | |
| Ronan Perrot | Reconquête | | 427 | 0.64 | | |
| Annie Colinet | Independent | | 293 | 0.44 | | |
| Total | | | 67,160 | 100.00 | 64,297 | 100.00 |
| Valid votes | | | 67,160 | 97.30 | 64,297 | 94.14 |
| Invalid votes | | | 358 | 0.52 | 480 | 0.70 |
| Blank votes | | | 1,505 | 2.18 | 3,520 | 5.15 |
| Total votes | | | 69,023 | 100.00 | 68,297 | 100.00 |
| Registered voters/turnout | | | 93,853 | 73.54 | 93,868 | 72.76 |

=== 4th constituency ===
| Candidate | Party or alliance | | First round | | Second round | |
| Candidate | Party or alliance | | Votes | % | Votes | % |
|---|---|---|---|---|---|---|
| Sylvaine Vulpiani | New Popular Front | Génération.s | 18,765 | 30.92 | 20,490 | 33.57 |
| Sandrine Le Feur | Ensemble | Renaissance | 18,586 | 30.63 | 24,048 | 39.40 |
| Tony Bihouée | National Rally | | 15,690 | 25.86 | 16,492 | 27.02 |
| Agnès Le Brun | Miscellaneous right | | 6,697 | 11.04 | | |
| Patricia Blosse | Far-left | Lutte Ouvrière | 942 | 1.55 | | |
| Total | | | 60,680 | 100.00 | 61,030 | 100.00 |
| Valid votes | | | 60,680 | 97.86 | 61,030 | 97.45 |
| Invalid votes | | | 365 | 0.59 | 341 | 0.54 |
| Blank votes | | | 963 | 1.55 | 1,257 | 2.01 |
| Total votes | | | 62,008 | 100.00 | 62,628 | 100.00 |
| Registered voters/turnout | | | 84,364 | 73.50 | 84,363 | 74.24 |

=== 5th constituency ===
| Candidate | Party or alliance | | First round | | Second round | |
| Candidate | Party or alliance | | Votes | % | Votes | % |
|---|---|---|---|---|---|---|
| Graziella Melchior | Ensemble | Renaissance | 21,567 | 30.30 | 46,270 | 68.07 |
| Gladys Grelaud | New Popular Front | Communist Party | 19,371 | 27.22 | | |
| Renée Thomaïdis | National Rally | | 18,884 | 26.53 | 21,704 | 31.93 |
| Félix Briant | The Republicans | | 7,943 | 11.16 | | |
| Marcel Berrou | Regionalists | Independent | 1,807 | 2.54 | | |
| Alexandre Martin | Sovereigntist right | Debout la France | 641 | 0.90 | | |
| Christian Cajean | Far-left | Lutte Ouvrière | 553 | 0.78 | | |
| Dominique Lerestif | Miscellaneous centre | Independent | 402 | 0.56 | | |
| Total | | | 71,168 | 100.00 | 67,974 | 100.00 |
| Valid votes | | | 71,168 | 97.86 | 67,974 | 94.09 |
| Invalid votes | | | 437 | 0.60 | 982 | 1.36 |
| Blank votes | | | 1,119 | 1.54 | 3,291 | 4.56 |
| Total votes | | | 72,724 | 100.00 | 72,247 | 100.00 |
| Registered voters/turnout | | | 98,753 | 73.64 | 98,771 | 73.15 |

=== 6th constituency ===
| Candidate | Party or alliance | | First round | | Second round | |
| Candidate | Party or alliance | | Votes | % | Votes | % |
|---|---|---|---|---|---|---|
| Mélanie Thomin | New Popular Front | Socialist Party | 24,664 | 37.88 | 38,392 | 62.43 |
| Patrick Le Fur | National Rally | | 19,671 | 30.21 | 23,106 | 37.57 |
| Erwan Crouan | Ensemble | Miscellaneous centre | 18,223 | 27.99 | | |
| Tugdal Perennec | Miscellaneous left | Independent | 808 | 1.24 | | |
| Philippe Cordier | Far-left | Lutte Ouvrière | 753 | 1.16 | | |
| Evelyne Carayon | Reconquête | | 637 | 0.98 | | |
| Kenny Delferrière | Far-left | New Anticapitalist Party | 360 | 0.55 | | |
| Total | | | 65,116 | 100.00 | 61,498 | 100.00 |
| Valid votes | | | 65,116 | 97.29 | 61,498 | 92.17 |
| Invalid votes | | | 521 | 0.78 | 1,257 | 1.88 |
| Blank votes | | | 1,294 | 1.93 | 3,966 | 5.94 |
| Total votes | | | 66,931 | 100.00 | 66,721 | 100.00 |
| Registered voters/turnout | | | 91,534 | 73.12 | 91,536 | 72.89 |

=== 7th constituency ===
| Candidate | Party or alliance | | First round | | Second round | |
| Candidate | Party or alliance | | Votes | % | Votes | % |
|---|---|---|---|---|---|---|
| Jugdeep Harvinder | New Popular Front | La France Insoumise | 18,952 | 31.06 | 21,041 | 34.25 |
| Hayat Atia | Ensemble | Renaissance | 18,709 | 30.66 | 23,310 | 37.94 |
| Annick Alanou | National Rally | | 15,927 | 26.10 | 17,084 | 27.81 |
| Marc Raher | The Republicans | | 4,470 | 7.32 | | |
| Aela Malet | Regionalists | Breton Party | 1,135 | 1.86 | | |
| Régis Debliqui | Far-left | Lutte Ouvrière | 972 | 1.59 | | |
| Kacques Tanguy | Sovereigntist right | Miscellaneous centre | 861 | 1.41 | | |
| Total | | | 61,026 | 100.00 | 61,435 | 100.00 |
| Valid votes | | | 61,026 | 97.52 | 61,435 | 96.91 |
| Invalid votes | | | 521 | 0.83 | 577 | 0.91 |
| Blank votes | | | 1,032 | 1.65 | 1,379 | 2.18 |
| Total votes | | | 62,579 | 100.00 | 63,391 | 100.00 |
| Registered voters/turnout | | | 83,684 | 74.78 | 83,676 | 75.76 |

=== 8th constituency ===
| Candidate | Party or alliance | | First round | | Second round | |
| Candidate | Party or alliance | | Votes | % | Votes | % |
|---|---|---|---|---|---|---|
| Christian Pérez | National Rally | | 20,003 | 30.80 | 21,974 | 35.39 |
| Erwan Balanant | Ensemble | Renaissance | 18,031 | 27.76 | 40,112 | 64.61 |
| Sébastien Miossec | Miscellaneous left | Socialist Party (Note: Dissident that ran without the support of the New Popular Front.) | 14,399 | 22.17 | | |
| Thomas Le Bon | New Popular Front | La France Insoumise | 11,768 | 18.12 | | |
| Anne Morel | Far-left | Lutte Ouvrière | 741 | 1.14 | | |
| Total | | | 64,942 | 100.00 | 62,086 | 100.00 |
| Valid votes | | | 64,942 | 97.48 | 62,086 | 93.78 |
| Invalid votes | | | 542 | 0.81 | 1,150 | 1.74 |
| Blank votes | | | 1,139 | 1.71 | 2,966 | 4.48 |
| Total votes | | | 66,623 | 100.00 | 66,202 | 100.00 |
| Registered voters/turnout | | | 91,739 | 72.62 | 91,749 | 72.16 |
