= Charles Miossec =

French politician (1938–2020)

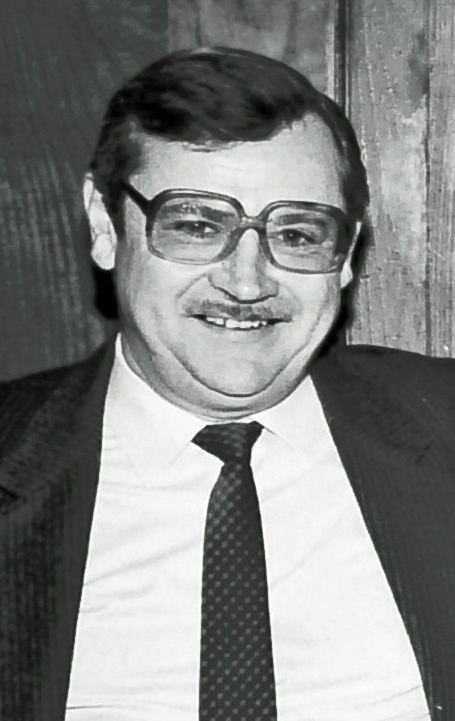
- Miossec in 1984

Member of the National Assembly for Finistère's 5th constituency
- In office 23 June 1988 – 19 June 2002
- Succeeded by: Jacques Le Guen

Mayor of Landivisiau
- In office 1983–2001

Personal details
- Born: Charles Noël Miossec; 25 December 1938; Lanhouarneau, France
- Died: 12 April 2020 (aged 81); Landivisiau, France
- Political party: RPR

Charles Miossec (25 December 1938 – 12 April 2020) was a French politician.

Miossec was born on 25 December 1938 in Lanhouarneau. The family moved to Paris, as his father was a member of the Republican Guard. Miossec finished business school, and began work for Rhône-Poulenc. By 1963, he returned to Finistère and worked for the Guével winery in Pleyber-Christ. He served on the Loc-Eguiner-Saint-Thégonnec municipal council. Miossec won his first election to the National Assembly in 1978, succeeding Yves Michel, who was himself completing the term of Antoine Caill, who had died in office. Throughout his tenure as a deputy, Miossec represented Finistère's 5th constituency and was affiliated with Rally for the Republic. Miossec faced opposition only in 1997, his final reelection campaign, defeating mayor of Landerneau Jean-Pierre Thomin.

Miossec was elected to the Finistère general council in 1982 and served as president of the body from 1988 to 1998. He replaced Louis Orvoën and was succeeded by Pierre Maille. Miossec was mayor of Landivisiau between 1983 and 2001. In this role, he succeeded Yves Queguiner and proceeded Georges Tigréat. Following his retirement from politics, Miossec was awarded knighthood of the Legion of Honor in 2002, and named honorary mayor of Landivisiau in 2005. He died on 12 April 2020, aged 81.
