= Finistère's 2nd constituency =

Constituency of the National Assembly of France

2nd constituency of Finistère
- inline Constituency of the National Assembly of France

- Constituency in department

- Finistère in France
- Deputy: Pierre-Yves Cadalen; LFI
- Department: Finistère
- Cantons: (pre-2015) Brest-Cavale-Blanche-Bohars-Guilers, Brest-Centre, Brest-Kerichen, Brest-L'Hermitage-Gouesnou, Brest-Lambezellec, Brest-Saint-Marc

The 2nd constituency of Finistère is a French legislative constituency in the Finistère département, comprising the city of Brest.

== Deputies ==
Election	Member	Party
1958	Georges Lombard	CNIP
1962	Charles Le Goasguen	UNR
1967	Georges Lombard	CNIP
1968	Michel de Bennetot	UDR
1973	Michel de Bennetot	UDR
1978	Eugène Berest	UDF
1981	Joseph Gourmelon	PS
1986	Proportional representation - no election by constituency	
1988	Joseph Gourmelon	PS
1993	Bertrand Cousin	RPR
1997	Jean-Noël Kerdraon	PS
2002	Patricia Adam	PS
2007	Patricia Adam	PS
2012	Patricia Adam	PS
2017	Jean-Charles Larsonneur	LREM
2022	Jean-Charles Larsonneur	LREM
2024	Pierre-Yves Cadalen	LFI

== Election results ==
=== 2024 ===
Candidate	Party	Alliance	First round			Second round		
Candidate	Party	Alliance	Votes	%	+/–	Votes	%	+/–
Pierre-Yves Cadalen	LFI	NFP	18,850	35.28	+1.36	22,110	41.01	-8.83
Danis Kervella	RN		12,065	22.58	+12.55	12,567	23.31	N/A
Jean-Charles Larsonneur	RE diss.		9,874	18.48	+2.87	19,239	35.68	-14.48
Tristan Bréhier	RE	ENS	9,105	17.04	+3.47			
Françoise Houard	LR		1,444	2.70	-0.87			
Geneviève Henry	DVE		1,131	2.12	N/A			
Alain Rousseau	REC		373	0.70	-3.20			
Rémy Collard	LO		357	0.67	+0.13			
Melvyn Hita	EXG		172	0.32	N/A			
Martial Koffi	EXD		55	0.10	N/A			
Valid votes			53,426	97.93	+0.43	53,916	97.91	+3.39
Blank votes			1,075	1.97	-0.43	1,105	2.01	-3.31
Null votes			56	0.10	±0.00	45	0.08	-0.08
Turnout			54,557	69.80	+20.47	55,066	70.43	+22.09
Abstentions			23,609	30.20	-20.47	23,119	29.57	-22.09
Registered voters			78,166			78,185		
Source: Ministry of the Interior, Le Monde
Result						LFI GAIN FROM RE		

=== 2022 ===
Legislative Election 2022: Finistère's 2nd constituency
Party	Candidate	Votes	%	±%
LFI (NUPÉS)	Pierre-Yves Cadalen	12,135	31.91	-1.92
LREM	Jean-Charles Larsonneur*	5,936	15.61	N/A
LREM (Ensemble)	Marc Coatanea	5,159	13.57	−26.42
RN	Yvette Poullaouec	3,815	10.03	+2.76
PS	Réza Salami**	3,782	9.94	N/A
REC	Elisabeth Louvel	1,484	3.90	N/A
LREM	Mikaël Cabon*	1,451	3.82	N/A
UDI (UDC)	Anne Gelebart	1,356	3.57	−8.13
UDB	Sandrine Migerel	766	2.01	N/A
Others	N/A	2,146	5.64	
Turnout		38,030	49.33	−2.48
2nd round result
LREM	Jean-Charles Larsonneur*	18,127	50.16	−9.42
LFI (NUPÉS)	Pierre-Yves Cadalen	18,009	49.84	+9.42
Turnout		36,136	48.34	+4.26
LREM hold				

* LREM dissidents
** PS dissident

=== 2017 ===
Candidate	Label	First round		Second round	
Candidate	Label	Votes	%	Votes	%
Jean-Charles Larsonneur	REM	15,764	39.99	18,638	59.58
Pierre-Yves Cadalen	FI	5,954	15.10	12,646	40.42
Patricia Adam	PS	5,559	14.10		
Véronique Bourbigot	LR	4,612	11.70		
Karine Léal	FN	2,865	7.27		
Nathalie Chaline	ECO	1,203	3.05		
Éric Guellec	PCF	624	1.58		
Christophe Monnier	DVD	596	1.51		
Colette Kerrain	REG	419	1.06		
Jean-François Labiau	DIV	365	0.93		
Patrick Merdy	REG	298	0.76		
Barthélémy Gonella	DVG	291	0.74		
Gaëtan Segalen	DIV	278	0.71		
André Cherblanc	EXG	264	0.67		
Gilles Le Roux	DIV	175	0.44		
Roger Calvez	EXG	155	0.39		
Votes		39,422	100.00	31,284	100.00
Valid votes		39,422	97.90	31,284	91.31
Blank votes		827	2.05	2,851	8.32
Null votes		20	0.05	125	0.36
Turnout		40,269	51.81	34,260	44.08
Abstentions		37,455	48.19	43,464	55.92
Registered voters		77,724		77,724	
Source: Ministry of the Interior

=== 2012 ===
2012 legislative election in Finistere's 2nd constituency
Candidate	Party	First round		Second round	
Candidate	Party	Votes	%	Votes	%
Patricia Adam	PS	20,655	49.36%	26,134	66.84%
Marc Berthelot	UMP	9,416	22.50%	12,963	33.16%
Madeleine Fabre	FN	3,595	8.59%		
Jacqueline Here	FG	2,824	6.75%		
Fortuné Pellicano	MoDem	2,030	4.85%		
Julie Le Goic	EELV	1,959	4.68%		
Anne-Marie Kervern	UDB	657	1.57%		
Sylvie Gourmelen	NPA	358	0.86%		
Lydie Contignon	POI	184	0.44%		
André Cherblanc	LO	167	0.40%		
Valid votes		41,845	98.18%	39,097	96.56%
Spoilt and null votes		776	1.82%	1,394	3.44%
Votes cast / turnout		42,621	54.56%	40,491	51.84%
Abstentions		35,493	45.44%	37,623	48.16%
Registered voters		78,114	100.00%	78,114	100.00%

=== 2007 ===
Legislative Election 2007: Finistère's 2nd constituency
Party	Candidate	Votes	%	±%
PS	Patricia Adam	15,653	36.77	
UMP	Jean Yves Le Borgne	14,710	34.56	
MoDem	Yves Pages	4,633	10.88	
Far left	Patrick Appere	1,438	3.38	
LV	Marif Loussouarn	1,324	3.11	
Far left	André Garcon	1,121	2.63	
PCF	Gaëlle Abily	1,060	2.49	
Others	N/A	2,630		
Turnout		43,219	60.68	
2nd round result
PS	Patricia Adam	23,681	55.51	
UMP	Jean Yves Le Borgne	18,980	44.49	
Turnout		43,694	61.35	
PS hold				

=== 2002 ===
Legislative Election 2002: Finistère's 2nd constituency
Party	Candidate	Votes	%	±%
PS	Patricia Adam	14,895	34.50	
UMP	Claudine Peron	11,437	26.49	
DVD	Jacques Berthelot	6,642	15.38	
FN	Yves Sellier	2,137	4.95	
Far left	Patrick Appere	2,098	4.86	
LV	Marif Loussouarn	2,035	4.71	
PCF	Gaëlle Abily	985	2.28	
Others	N/A	2,944		
Turnout		43,666	64.18	
2nd round result
PS	Patricia Adam	22,085	52.71	
UMP	Claudine Peron	19,815	47.29	
Turnout		42,796	62.90	
PS hold				

=== 1997 ===
Legislative Election 1997: Finistère's 2nd constituency
Party	Candidate	Votes	%	±%
PS	Jean-Noël Kerdraon	13,084	29.86	
RPR	Jacques Berthelot	9,210	21.02	
UDF	Yannick Marzin	6,160	14.06	
FN	Olivier Morize	3,689	8.42	
PS	Joseph Gourmelon*	2,632	6.01	
PCF	Jacqueline Here	2,250	5.14	
LV	Marie-Françoise Loussouarn	1,862	4.25	
LO	André Cherblanc	1,143	2.61	
Far left	Louis Aminot	995	2.27	
GE	Albert Mevellec	992	2.26	
Others	N/A	1,799		
Turnout		45,252	65.85	
2nd round result
PS	Jean-Noël Kerdraon	25,424	54.99	
RPR	Jacques Berthelot	20,806	45.01	
Turnout		47,886	69.69	
PS gain from RPR				

* PS dissident

== Sources ==
- Official results of French elections from 1998: "Résultats électoraux officiels en France" (in French). Archived from the original on 20 December 2011.
