= Maël de Calan =

French politician (born 1980)

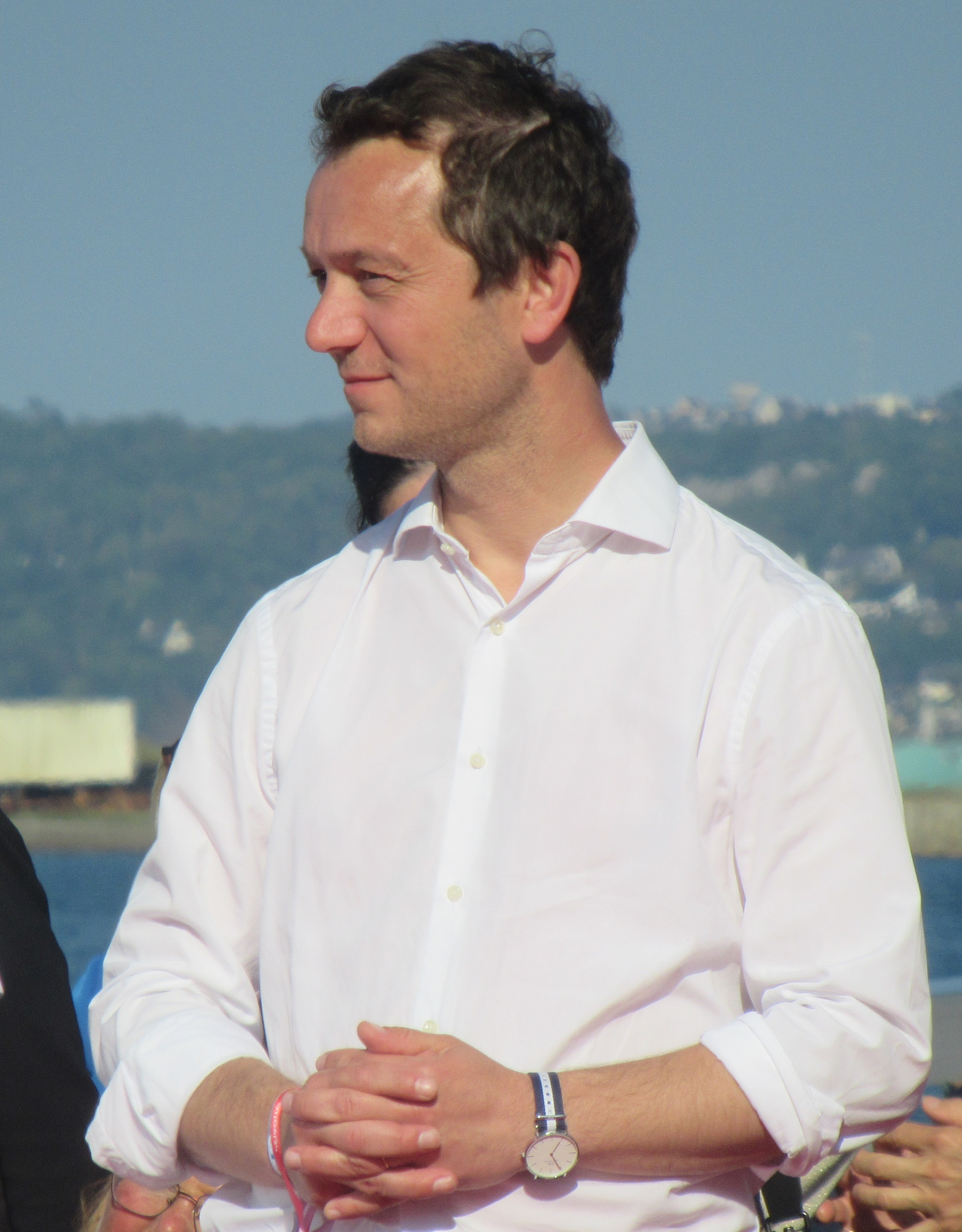
- De Calan in 2024

President of the Departmental Council of Finistère
- Incumbent
- Assumed office 1 July 2021
- Preceded by: Nathalie Sarrabezolles

Personal details
- Born: Maël de La Lande de Calan; 30 April 1980 (age 45) Marseille, France
- Party: Soyons libres (2018–present)
- Other political affiliations: Rally for the Republic (1998–2002); Union for a Popular Movement (2002–2015); The Republicans (2015–2019)

Maël de La Lande de Calan (French pronunciation: [maɛl d(ə) la lɑ̃d də kalɑ̃]; born 30 April 1980) is a French politician who has served as President of the Departmental Council of Finistère since 2021. He has been a departmental councillor for the canton of Saint-Pol-de-Léon since 2015, as well as a municipal councillor of Roscoff since 2014. De Calan ran in the 2017 The Republicans leadership election, placing third.

== Early life and career ==
De Calan was born in Marseille in 1980, and joined the Rally for the Republic at the age of 18. While studying at Sciences Po in 2002, he was the last leader of its Rally for the Republic branch, and the first leader of its Union for a Popular Movement branch. He later studied at HEC Paris, where he served as leader of its Union for a Popular Movement branch. He was a co-leader of the La Boîte à idées motion at the 2012 party congress, and was appointed member of its political bureau in 2013. He was elected municipal councillor of Roscoff in 2014, and was elected member of the Departmental Council of Finistère in 2015.

In 2016, de Calan was elected leader of The Republicans in Finistère. Ahead of the party's 2016 presidential primary, he served as spokesperson for Alain Juppé. He was a candidate for leader of The Republicans in the 2017 election, and finished third to Laurent Wauquiez and Florence Portelli. In the 2017 legislative election, he was a candidate for Finistère's 4th constituency. He joined Soyons libres in February 2018, and was appointed as its vice president. In August 2018, he stood down as leader of The Republicans in Finistère, and endorsed Philippe Paul as his successor. He left The Republicans in 2019, alongside Valérie Pécresse.
