= Jacques Berthelot =

French politician (1946–2024)

Mayor of Brest
- In office 13 March 1983 – 4 July 1985
- Preceded by: Pierre Maille
- Succeeded by: Georges Kerbrat

Member of the General Council of Finistère
- In office 1985–1998
- Preceded by: position established
- Succeeded by: Jean Mobian
- Constituency: Canton of Brest-Cavale-Blanche-Bohars-Guilers

Personal details
- Born: 1946 Nantes, France
- Died: 28 June 2024 (aged 78)
- Party: RPR
- Education: Agrégation de mathématiques
- Occupation: Schoolteacher

Jacques Berthelot (1946 – 28 June 2024) was a French politician of the Rally for the Republic (RPR). To date, he is the most recent right-wing politician to serve as mayor of Brest, where he was in office from 1983 to 1985.

== Biography ==
Born in Nantes in 1946, Berthelot earned an Agrégation de mathématiques and became a teacher at the École navale. He began his career in politics in 1982 in that year's cantonal elections, but was not elected. The sudden death of incumbent mayor Francis Le Blé in 1982 led him to join the municipal council, defeating Le Blé's widow for the seat. In 1983, he was elected mayor of Brest with a lead of 600 votes. However, following a dispute between the RPR and the Union for French Democracy, he resigned on 4 July 1985. During his tenure, he broke the partnership contract between his city and Tallinn, capital of the then-Estonian Soviet Socialist Republic, instead opting to denounce the presence of Soviet spy ships off of the coast of Île Longue and refused an investigation into human rights by Amnesty International. He was subsequently elected to the General Council of Finistère in 1985, serving the Canton of Brest-Cavale-Blanche-Bohars-Guilers until 1998.

Berthelot died on 28 June 2024, at the age of 78.
