= Yves Michel =

French politician

Member of the National Assembly for Finistère's 5th constituency
- In office 1976–1978
- Preceded by: Antoine Caill
- Succeeded by: Charles Miossec

Personal details
- Born: Yves Marie Michel; 18 July 1920; Plouescat, France
- Died: 15 November 1983 (aged 63); Brest, France

Yves Michel (18 July 1920 – 15 November 1983) was a French politician.

Michel was the mayor of Plouescat from 1971 to 1976. After the death of Antoine Caill, Michel completed Caill's term in the National Assembly, serving as a deputy from 1976 to 1978. Michel did not run for reelection and the seat was filled by Charles Miossec.
