= Daniel Fasquelle =

French politician

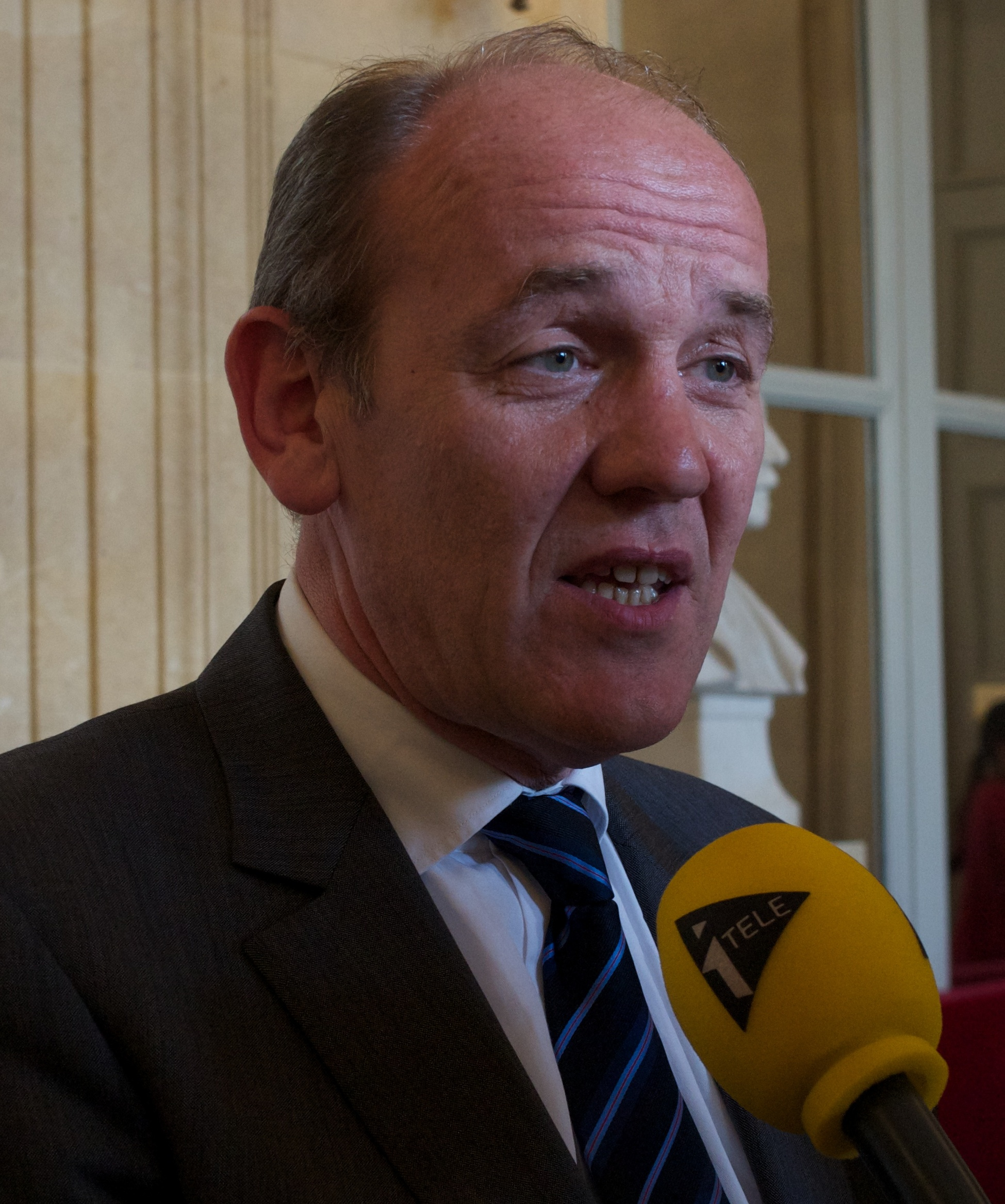
- Daniel Fasquelle in 2013

Mayor of Le Touquet-Paris-Plage
- Incumbent
- Assumed office 5 July 2020
- Preceded by: Lilyane Lussignol
- In office 9 March 2008 – 10 July 2017
- Preceded by: Léonce Deprez
- Succeeded by: Lilyane Lussignol

Member of the Regional Council of Hauts-de-France
- Incumbent
- Assumed office 2 July 2021
- President: Xavier Bertrand
- Constituency: Pas-de-Calais

Member of the National Assembly for Pas-de-Calais's 4th constituency
- In office 20 June 2007 – 5 August 2020
- Preceded by: Léonce Deprez
- Succeeded by: Robert Therry

Personal details
- Born: 16 January 1963 (age 63) Saint-Omer, France
- Party: The Republicans (2015–present)
- Other political affiliations: Union for a Popular Movement (2007–2015)
- Education: Paris 2 Panthéon-Assas University

Daniel Fasquelle (born 16 January 1963) is a French politician of The Republicans (LR) who served as a member of the National Assembly of France from 2007 to 2020, representing the Pas-de-Calais department.

== Political career ==
In parliament, Fasquelle has been serving on the Committee on Economic Affairs since 2009.

In the Republicans’ 2016 presidential primaries, Fasquelle endorsed Nicolas Sarkozy as the party's candidate for the office of President of France.

On 26 August 2017, Fasquelle declared himself a candidate in the leadership election for the presidency of The Republicans, but was deemed to have secured an insufficient number of sponsorships on 26 October and therefore considered ineligible.

Following Christian Jacob's election as LR chairman, Fasquelle announced his candidacy to succeed him as leader of the party's parliamentary group. In an internal vote in November 2019, he eventually came in fourth out of six candidates; the position went to Damien Abad instead.

At the Republicans’ national convention in December 2021, Fasquelle was part of the 11-member committee which oversaw the party's selection of its candidate for the 2022 presidential elections.
