= Patricia Adam =

French politician (born 1953)

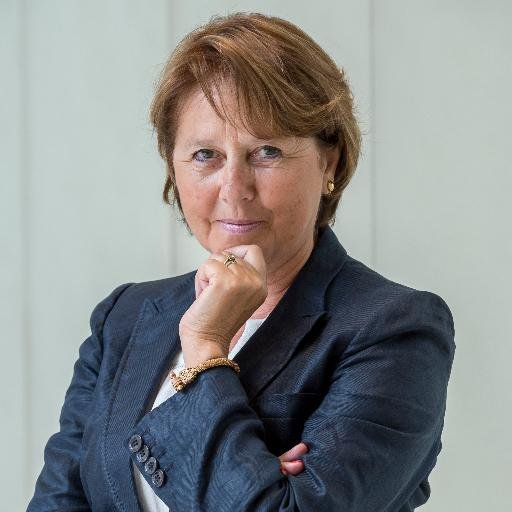

Member of the National Assembly of France for 2nd Constituency of Finistère
- In office 2002 election – 2017 election
- Preceded by: Jean-Noël Kerdraon
- Succeeded by: Jean-Charles Larsonneur

Member of the General Council of Finistère
- Incumbent
- Assumed office 1998

Personal details
- Born: 15 April 1953 (age 72) Saint-Cloud, Hauts-de-Seine, France
- Party: PS
- Committees: National Defence and Armed Forces Committee

Patricia Adam (born 15 April 1953) was a member of the National Assembly of France from 2002 to 2017. She represented the 2nd constituency of the Finistère department as a member of the Socialist Party.

== Biography ==
Patricia Adam began her political career in 1989 as part of the team of socialist Pierre Maille, who became the mayor of Brest after six years of control by the right. She became deputy mayor and councillor of the Urban Community of Brest.

In 1998, she was elected general council of the Canton of Brest-Saint-Marc when the general council of Finistère swung to the left for the first time. Again, alongside Pierre Maille, president of the general council, she became elected vice-president of this assembly.

She was first elected MP on 16 June 2002 in the 2nd constituency of Finistère. She then stood down from municipal office to devote herself to this new national mandate and that of vice-president of the General Council. She became a member of the Defense Committee of the National Assembly and was delegate of the National Assembly to women's rights and equality of opportunity between men and women.

In 2004 she was re-elected to the General Council of Finistère and retained her post as its vice-president. In September 2006, Adam endorsed Dominique Strauss-Kahn to be the Socialist Party candidate for the 2007 presidential elections.

She was re-elected MP on 17 June 2007 in the second round with 55.51% of the vote. She is again a member of the defense committee.

In May 2008, she supported the candidacy of Bertrand Delanoë to the post of First Secretary of the Socialist Party.

She was defeated in the 2017 election by Jean-Charles Larsonneur of LREM.
