= Marylise Lebranchu =

French politician

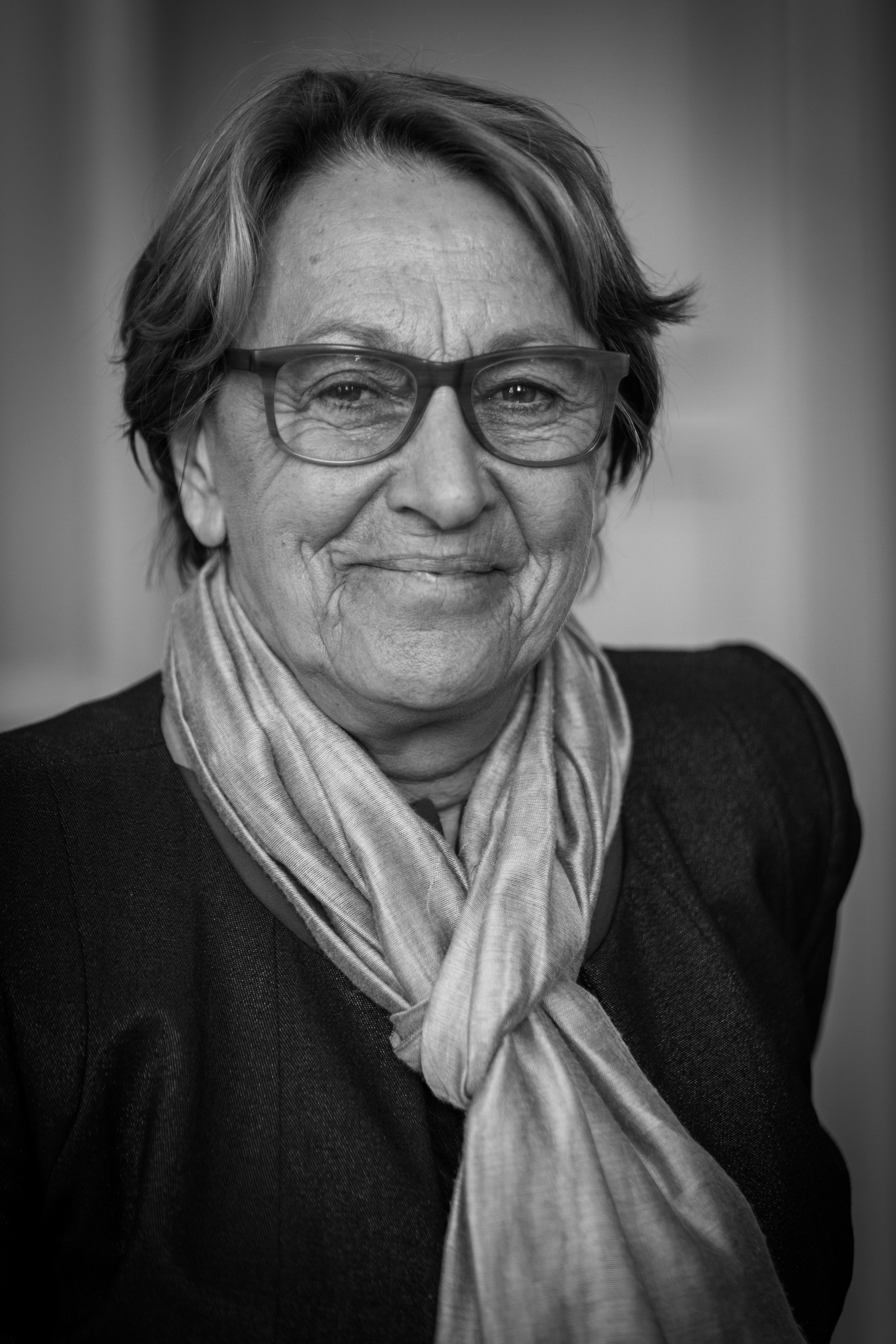
- Marylise Lebranchu in 2015

Minister of the Reform of the State
- In office 16 May 2012 – 11 February 2016
- President: François Hollande
- Prime Minister: Jean-Marc Ayrault; Manuel Valls
- Preceded by: Valérie Pécresse
- Succeeded by: Annick Girardin

Questeur of the National Assembly
- In office 26 June 2007 – 19 June 2012
- President: Bernard Accoyer
- Preceded by: Didier Migaud
- Succeeded by: Philippe Briand

Minister of Justice
- In office 18 October 2000 – 6 May 2002
- President: Jacques Chirac
- Prime Minister: Lionel Jospin
- Preceded by: Élisabeth Guigou
- Succeeded by: Dominique Perben

Secretary of State for small and medium size businesses, Trade, Arts and Crafts, and Consumption
- In office 4 June 1997 – 19 October 2000
- President: Jacques Chirac
- Prime Minister: Lionel Jospin
- Preceded by: Jean-Pierre Raffarin
- Succeeded by: François Patriat

Member of the National Assembly of France
- In office 12 March 2016 – 20 June 2017
- Preceded by: Gwenegan Bui
- Succeeded by: Sandrine Le Feur
- Parliamentary group: SER
- Constituency: Finistère's 4th constituency
- In office 19 June 2002 – 21 July 2012
- Preceded by: Yvon Abiven
- Succeeded by: Gwenegan Bui
- Parliamentary group: SER
- Constituency: Finistère's 4th constituency
- In office 1 June 1997 – 4 July 1997
- Preceded by: Arnaud Cazin d'Honincthun
- Succeeded by: Yvon Abiven
- Parliamentary group: SOC
- Constituency: Finistère's 4th constituency

Personal details
- Born: Marylise Perrault; 25 April 1947 (age 79) Loudéac, France
- Party: PS
- Spouse: Jean Lebranchu
- Children: 3
- Education: University of Rennes

Marylise Lebranchu (French pronunciation: [maʁiliz ləbʁɑ̃ʃy]; born 25 April 1947 in Loudéac, Côtes-d'Armor) is a French politician of the Socialist Party who served as Minister of the Reform of the State and of Decentralisation under Prime Minister Jean-Marc Ayrault.

== Political career ==
Lebranchu served a Minister Delegate in charge of SMEs, Trade, Crafts, Liberal Professions and Consumer Affairs in the cabinet of Prime Minister Lionel Jospin from 1997 to 2002. In 1999, she lifted the French government's ban on sales of Coke, Sprite and Fanta produced at Coca-Cola Enterprises' Dunkirk site. From 2000 to 2002, Lebranchu served as Minister of Justice.

Lebranchu then served as a member of the National Assembly of France, representing Finistère's 4th constituency from 1997 to 2012. During that time, she was part of the Socialiste, radical, citoyen et divers gauche parliamentary group. She served on the Committee for Economic Affairs (2002–2007) and the Committee on National Defence and the Armed Force (2007–2012).

In the Socialist Party's 2011 primaries, Lebranchu endorsed Martine Aubry as the party's candidate for the 2012 presidential election.

On 16 May 2012, Lebranchu was named Minister of the Reform of the State and of Decentralization in the first Cabinet of French President Francois Hollande and Prime Minister Jean-Marc Ayrault and Manuel Valls. In this capacity, she drafted a plan in 2014 for measured wage civil service pay rises covering the 2017-2020 period.

Ahead of the Socialist Party's 2017 primaries, Lebranchu publicly endorsed Benoît Hamon as the party's candidate for the presidential election later that year.

Political offices
Preceded by Élisabeth Guigou	Minister of Justice; 2000–2002	Succeeded by Dominique Perben
