= Antoine Caill =

French politician

Member of the National Assembly for Finistère's 5th constituency
- In office 6 December 1962 – 26 April 1976
- Preceded by: Joseph Pinvidic
- Succeeded by: Yves Michel

Personal details
- Born: Antoine François Caill; 7 February 1923 Plouzévédé, France
- Died: 26 April 1976 (aged 53) Plouzévédé, France
- Party: Union for the New Republic

Antoine Caill (7 February 1923 – 26 April 1976) was a French politician.

Caill was born on 7 February 1923. He was first elected mayor of Plouzévédé in 1959. From 1962, Caill was a member of the National Assembly, representing Finistère. He died on 26 April 1976 of a stroke. Caill was succeeded as mayor by his wife Marguerite, who served until 2001, and was subsequently named honorary mayor. Yves Michel replaced Antoine Caill as a deputy.
