= Finistère's 4th constituency =

Constituency of the National Assembly of France

4th constituency of Finistère
- inline Constituency of the National Assembly of France

- Constituency in department

- Finistère in France
- Deputy: Sandrine Le Feur; RE
- Department: Finistère
- Cantons: (pre-2015) Lanmeur, Morlaix, Ploudiry, Plouigneau, Plouzévédé, Saint-Pol-de-Léon, Saint-Thégonnec, Sizun, Taulé
- Registered voters: 106,027

The 4th constituency of Finistère is a French legislative constituency in the Finistère département. Like the other 576 French constituencies, it elects one MP using the two-round system, with a run-off if no candidate receives over 50% of the vote in the first round.

== Deputies ==
Election	Member	Party
1988	Marie Jacq	PS
1993	Arnaud Cazin d'Honincthun	UDF
1997	Marylise Lebranchu	PS
2002	Marylise Lebranchu	PS
2007	Marylise Lebranchu	PS
2012	Marylise Lebranchu	PS
2012	Gwenegan Bui	PS
2016	Marylise Lebranchu	PS
2017	Sandrine Le Feur	LREM
2022	Sandrine Le Feur	LREM
2024	Sandrine Le Feur	RE

== Election results ==
=== 2024 ===
Candidate	Party	Alliance	First round			Second round		
Candidate	Party	Alliance	Votes	%	+/–	Votes	%	+/–
Sylvaine Vulpiani	G.s	NFP	18,765	30.92	-2.63	20,490	33.57	-12.03
Sandrine Le Feur	RE	ENS	18,586	30.63	-4.86	24,048	39.40	-15.00
Tony Bihouse	RN		15,690	25.86	+14.99	16,492	27.02	N/A
Agnès Le Brun	DVD		6,697	11.04	N/A			
Patricia Blosse	LO		942	1.55	+0.54			
Valid votes			60,680	97.86	+0.15	61,030	97.45	+3.20
Blank votes			963	1.55	-0.05	1,257	2.01	-2.02
Null votes			365	0.59	-0.10	341	0.54	-1.18
Turnout			62,008	73.50	+19.05	62,628	74.24	+21.15
Abstentions			22,356	26.50	-19.05	21,726	25.76	-21.15
Registered voters			84,364			84,354		
Source: Ministry of the Interior, Le Monde
Result						RE HOLD		

=== 2022 ===
Legislative Election 2022: Finistère's 4th constituency
Party	Candidate	Votes	%	±%
LREM (Ensemble)	Sandrine Le Feur	15,295	34.78	+4.53
G.s (NUPÉS)	Sylvaine Vulpiani	13,625	30.98	-0.25
RN	Tony Bihouee	5,181	11.78	+6.80
LR (UDC)	Marie-Claire Henaff	5,078	11.55	−16.97
REC	Jérôme Bergami	1,054	2.40	N/A
UDB	Micel Beaupre	971	2.21	N/A
DIV	Michel Patraud	908	2.06	N/A
Others	N/A	1,862	4.23	
Turnout		43,974	53.42	−4.42
2nd round result
LREM (Ensemble)	Sandrine Le Feur	22,872	54.40	+2.26
G.s (NUPÉS)	Sylvaine Vulpiani	19,169	45.60	N/A
Turnout		42,041	53.09	+3.11
LREM hold				

=== 2017 ===
Candidate	Label	First round		Second round	
Candidate	Label	Votes	%	Votes	%
Sandrine Le Feur	REM	14,143	30.25	19,001	52.14
Maël de Calan	LR	13,332	28.52	17,440	47.86
Julien Kerguillec	FI	5,970	12.77		
Gwenegan Bui	PS	5,727	12.25		
Édith Roussel	FN	2,329	4.98		
Christine Prigent	ECO	1,649	3.53		
Ismaël Dupont	PCF	1,254	2.68		
Corinne Nicole	REG	760	1.63		
Florian Le Saux	DLF	569	1.22		
Patricia Blosse	EXG	294	0.63		
Serge Bougot	REG	273	0.58		
Anne Chorlay	DIV	231	0.49		
Virginie Grall	DIV	218	0.47		
Jean-Paul Yves Le Goff	DVD	4	0.01		
Virginie Luret	DVD	1	0.00		
Votes		46,754	100.00	36,441	100.00
Valid votes		46,754	98.38	36,441	88.74
Blank votes		537	1.13	3,505	8.54
Null votes		232	0.49	1,118	2.72
Turnout		47,523	57.84	41,064	49.98
Abstentions		34,633	42.16	41,089	50.02
Registered voters		82,156		82,153	
Source: Ministry of the Interior

=== 2012 ===
2012 legislative election in Finistere's 4th constituency
Candidate	Party	First round		Second round	
Candidate	Party	Votes	%	Votes	%
Marylise Lebranchu	PS	24,900	48.21%	30,376	61.11%
Agnès Le Brun	UMP	16,830	32.59%	19,328	38.89%
Ismaël Dupont	FG	2,956	5.72%		
Francine Remacle	FN	2,614	5.06%		
Dominique Guizien	EELV	2,305	4.46%		
Carole Guillerm	MoDem	1,332	2.58%		
Yann Vallerie	JB (BNAFET)	301	0.58%		
Patricia Blosse	LO	268	0.52%		
René Delande		133	0.26%		
Jean-Paul-Yves Le Goff		8	0.02%		
Valid votes		51,647	98.95%	49,704	97.61%
Spoilt and null votes		547	1.05%	1,217	2.39%
Votes cast / turnout		52,194	63.55%	50,921	62.01%
Abstentions		29,934	36.45%	31,199	37.99%
Registered voters		82,128	100.00%	82,120	100.00%

=== 2007 ===
Legislative Election 2007: Finistère's 4th constituency
Party	Candidate	Votes	%	±%
PS	Marylise Lebranchu	21,494	40.16	
UMP	Gilles Caroff	19,428	36.30	
MoDem	Jocelyn Joncour	5,021	9.38	
LV	Christine Prigent-Guiziou	2,059	3.85	
Far left	Anne-Marie Gentric	1,373	2.57	
PCF	François Bourven	1,220	2.28	
Others	N/A	2,922		
Turnout		54,262	65.87	
2nd round result
PS	Marylise Lebranchu	29,833	54.38	
UMP	Gilles Caroff	25,023	45.62	
Turnout		56,199	68.22	
PS hold				

=== 2002 ===
Legislative Election 2002: Finistère's 4th constituency
Party	Candidate	Votes	%	±%
PS	Marylise Lebranchu	23,393	43.63	
UMP	Gilles Caroff	21,618	40.32	
LV	Michel Le Saint	2,018	3.76	
FN	Anne Storez	2,000	3.73	
PCF	Robert Dore	1,088	2.03	
Others	N/A	3,494		
Turnout		54,448	69.28	
2nd round result
PS	Marylise Lebranchu	28,877	52.92	
UMP	Gilles Caroff	25,690	47.08	
Turnout		55,669	70.85	
PS hold				

=== 1997 ===
Legislative Election 1997: Finistère's 4th constituency
Party	Candidate	Votes	%	±%
UDF	Arnaud Cazin d'Honincthun	19,778	37.90	
PS	Marylise Lebranchu	18,540	35.53	
PCF	Alain David	4,098	7.85	
FN	Charles Tronyo	3,351	6.42	
LV	Martine Frère	2,740	5.25	
GE	Monique Cherrier	1,484	2.84	
DVD	Roland Bonnefous	1,144	2.19	
Regionalist	Pierre Folgalvez	1,045	2.00	
Turnout		54,498	71.59	
2nd round result
PS	Marylise Lebranchu	30,022	52.65	
UDF	Arnaud Cazin d'Honincthun	27,004	47.35	
Turnout		59,012	77.53	
PS gain from UDF				

== Sources ==
- French Interior Ministry results website: "Résultats électoraux officiels en France" (in French).
