= Gwenegan Bui =

French politician (born 1974)

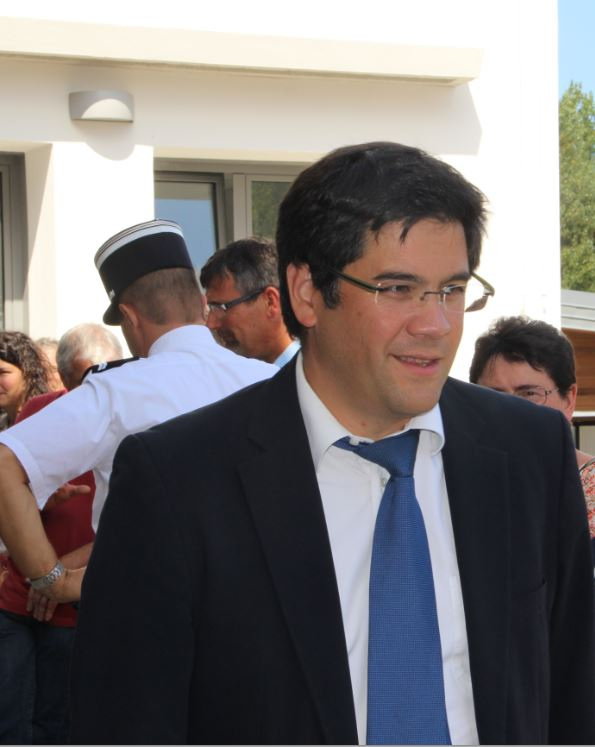
- Bui in 2013

Member of the French National Assembly for Finistère's 4th constituency
- In office 22 July 2012 – 11 March 2016
- Preceded by: Marylise Lebranchu
- Succeeded by: Marylise Lebranchu

Personal details
- Born: 27 July 1974 (age 51)
- Party: Socialist Party

Gwenegan Bui (born 27 July 1974) is a French politician. From 2012 to 2016, he was a member of the National Assembly. From 1999 to 2001, he served as president of the Young Socialist Movement.
