= Jacques Le Guen =

French politician (1958–2025)

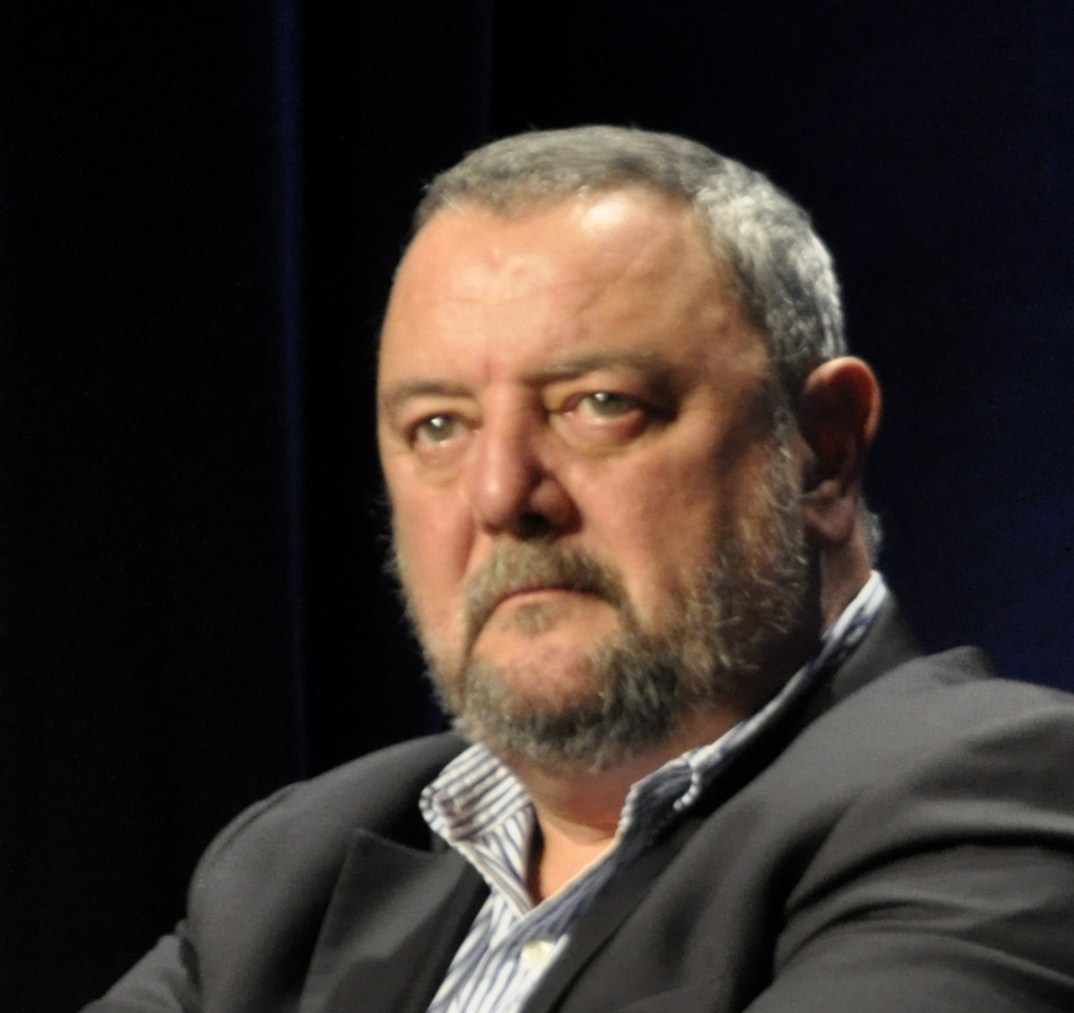
- Le Guen in 2010

Member of the National Assembly for Finistère's 5th constituency
- In office 19 June 2002 – 19 June 2012
- Preceded by: Charles Miossec
- Succeeded by: Chantal Guittet

Personal details
- Born: 8 March 1958 Brest, France
- Died: 20 August 2025 (aged 67) Plouescat, France
- Party: UMP; Solidary Republic
- Profession: Physician

Jacques Le Guen (8 March 1958 – 20 August 2025) was a French politician who was a member of the National Assembly of France. He represented the Finistère department, and was a member of the Union for a Popular Movement. Le Guen was born in Brest on 8 March 1958 and died in Plouescat on 20 August 2025 after a long illness at the age of 67.
