= Robert Therry =

French politician

Member of the National Assembly for Pas-de-Calais's 4th constituency
- In office 5 August 2020 – June 21, 2022
- Preceded by: Daniel Fasquelle
- Succeeded by: Philippe Fait

Personal details
- Born: 27 June 1947 (age 78) Marconnelle, Pas-de-Calais, France
- Party: The Republicans
- Occupation: beekeeper

Robert Therry (born 27 June 1947) is a French politician who has been Member of Parliament for Pas-de-Calais's 4th constituency from 2020 to 2022, when he replaced Daniel Fasquelle.
