= Louis Orvoën =

French politician

Member of the National Assembly for Finistère
- In office 19 January 1956 – 30 May 1968
- Succeeded by: Jean-Claude Petit

Personal details
- Born: 9 December 1919 Moëlan-sur-Mer, France
- Died: 21 September 1994 (aged 74) Moëlan-sur-Mer, France
- Party: MRP

Louis Orvoën (9 December 1919 – 21 September 1994) was a French politician.

Orvoën was a member of the National Assembly from 1946 to 1951. He returned to the legislative body in 1956, sat until 1968, and was later elected to Senate between 1971 and 1980.

Orvoën became mayor of Moëlan-sur-Mer in 1959, one year after his election to the general council of the canton of Pont-Aven. In 1978, he succeeded André Colin, who died in office, as President of the General Council of Finistère. Upon Orvoën's retirement in 1988, Charles Miossec replaced him.
