= Pas-de-Calais's 4th constituency =

Constituency of the National Assembly of France

4th constituency of the Pas-de-Calais
- inline Constituency of the National Assembly of France

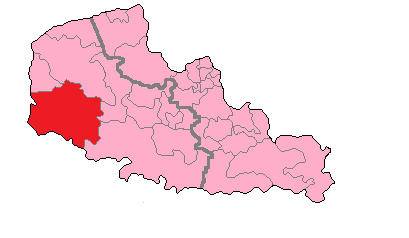
- Pas-de-Calais' 4th Constituency shown within Nord-Pas-de-Calais
- Deputy: Philippe Fait; RE
- Department: Pas-de-Calais
- Cantons: Auxi-le-Château, Campagne-lès-Hesdin, Étaples, Hesdin, Montreuil
- Registered voters: 87,387

The 4th constituency of the Pas-de-Calais is a French legislative constituency in the Pas-de-Calais département.

== Description ==
Pas-de-Calais' 4th constituency covers the south western corner of the department bordering the coast along its western edge and including the coastal towns of Berck and Étaples.

Unusually for Pas-de-Calais, its 4th constituency remained solidly conservative from 1988 to 2022.

== Historic Representation ==
Election	Member	Party
1986	Proportional representation – no election by constituency	
1988	Léonce Deprez	RPR
1993	Léonce Deprez	RPR
1997	Léonce Deprez	RPR
2002	Léonce Deprez	UMP
2007	Daniel Fasquelle	UMP
2012	Daniel Fasquelle	UMP
2015	Daniel Fasquelle	LR
2017	Daniel Fasquelle	LR
2020	Robert Therry	LR
2022	Philippe Fait	RE
2024	Philippe Fait	RE

== Election results ==
=== 2024 ===
Candidate	Party	Alliance	First round			Second round		
Candidate	Party	Alliance	Votes	%	+/–	Votes	%	+/–
Benoît Dolle	RN		25,286	42.34	+18.92	29,228	49.15	+5.51
Philippe Fait	RE	Ensemble	18,309	30.66	+0.95	30,237	50.85	-5.51
Blandine Drain	PS	NFP	8,794	14.73	-2.60			
Clémence Lambert	LR	UDC	5,501	9.21	-10.60			
Jérémy Durand	DVC		935	1.57	new			
Fanny Judek	REC		445	0.75	-2.61			
Dominique Héricourt	LO		442	0.74	-1.17			
Jean-Marc Sergent	DIV		6	0.01	new			
Votes			59,718	100.00		59,465	100.00	
Valid votes			59,718	97.41	+0.22	59,465	95.81	+3.41
Blank votes			1,089	1.78	-0.11	1,717	2.77	-2.34
Null votes			501	0.82	-0.10	881	1.42	-1.07
Turnout			61,308	68.15	+17.47	62,063	68.99	+19.20
Abstentions			28,655	31.85	-17.47	27,896	31.01	-19.20
Registered voters			89,963			89,959		
Result			RE HOLD					

=== 2022 ===
Legislative Election 2022: Pas-de-Calais's 4th constituency
Party	Candidate	Votes	%	±%
LREM (Ensemble)	Philippe Fait	13,168	29.71	-5.47
RN	Françoise Vanpeene	10,378	23.42	+8.87
LR (UDC)	Mary Bonvoisin	8,782	19.81	−11.21
PS (NUPÉS)	Blandine Drain	7,683	17.33	+3.74
REC	Dave Sergent	1,491	3.36	N/A
PA	Evelyne Ameye	905	2.04	N/A
Others	N/A	1,914	4.32	
Turnout		44,321	50.68	−5.65
2nd round result
LREM (Ensemble)	Philippe Fait	23,331	56.36	+8.55
RN	Françoise Vanpeene	18,063	43.64	N/A
Turnout		41,394	49.79	−4.04
LREM gain from LR				

=== 2017 ===
Candidate	Label	First round		Second round	
Candidate	Label	Votes	%	Votes	%
Thibaut Guilluy	REM	17,158	35.18	21,204	47.81
Daniel Fasquelle	LR	15,126	31.02	23,147	52.19
Benoît Dolle	FN	7,098	14.55		
Anaïs Alliot	FI	3,670	7.53		
Blandine Drain	PS	2,954	6.06		
Stéphane Sieczkowski-Samier	DVD	1,397	2.86		
Martine Minne	ECO	678	1.39		
Patrick Macquet	EXG	332	0.68		
Gwendoline Joos	DIV	223	0.46		
Estelle Gacquière	EXG	132	0.27		
Votes		48,768	100.00	44,351	100.00
Valid votes		48,768	97.80	44,351	93.07
Blank votes		757	1.52	2,134	4.48
Null votes		341	0.68	1,168	2.45
Turnout		49,866	56.33	47,653	53.83
Abstentions		38,662	43.67	40,867	46.17
Registered voters		88,528		88,520	
Source: Ministry of the Interior

=== 2012 ===
Legislative Election 2012: Pas-de-Calais's 4th constituency
Party	Candidate	Votes	%	±%
UMP	Daniel Fasquelle	23,116	43.89	−1.15
PS	Vincent Lena	18,321	34.78	+5.66
FN	Francis Leroy	6,785	12.88	+8.76
FG	Laurence Sauvage	2,307	4.38	+0.44
Others	N/A	1,109		
Turnout		52,674	60.28	−2.61
2nd round result
UMP	Daniel Fasquelle	28,704	54.87	+0.98
PS	Vincent Lena	23,604	45.13	−0.98
Turnout		52,308	59.86	−4.25
UMP hold				

=== 2007 ===
Legislative Election 2007: Pas-de-Calais's 4th constituency
Party	Candidate	Votes	%	±%
UMP	Daniel Fasquelle	21,857	45.04	
PS	Vincent Lena	14,132	29.12	
MoDem	Adam Kapella	2,772	5.71	
CPNT	Fabrice Gosselin	2,560	5.28	
FN	Renée Coolzaet	2,001	4.12	
PCF	Pascal Thiebaux	1,912	3.94	
Others	N/A	3,289		
Turnout		49,658	62.89	
2nd round result
UMP	Daniel Fasquelle	26,498	53.89	
PS	Vincent Lena	22,675	46.11	
Turnout		50,622	64.11	
UMP hold				

=== 2002 ===
Legislative Election 2002: Pas-de-Calais's 4th constituency
Party	Candidate	Votes	%	±%
UMP	Léonce Deprez	17,908	37.35	
PS	Daniele L'Homme	12,039	25.11	
CPNT	Didier Fremaux	4,544	9.48	
FN	Isabelle Secret	4,515	9.42	
DVD	Jean-Pierre Level	3,566	7.44	
PCF	Josette Samson	1,064	2.22	
Others	N/A	4,311		
Turnout		49,224	64.14	
2nd round result
UMP	Léonce Deprez	26,988	59.15	
PS	Danièle Lhomme	18,638	40.85	
Turnout		48,089	62.66	
UMP gain from UDF				

=== 1997 ===
Legislative Election 1997: Pas-de-Calais's 4th constituency
Party	Candidate	Votes	%	±%
UDF	Léonce Deprez	19,535	39.05	
PS	Danièle Lhomme	15,931	31.84	
FN	Francis Leroy	5,687	11.37	
PCF	Georges Baillet	4,096	8.19	
DVD	Martine Vandamme	2,005	4.01	
LV	Bernard Lebas	1,485	2.97	
GE	William Tison	1,291	2.58	
Turnout		52,591	72.30	
2nd round result
UDF	Léonce Deprez	27,161	51.18	
PS	Danièle Lhomme	25,904	48.82	
Turnout		55,664	76.53	
UDF hold				

== Sources ==
- Official results of French elections from 1998: "Résultats électoraux officiels en France" (in French).
