= Joseph Gourmelon =

French politician (died 2019)

Member of the National Assembly for Finistère's 2nd constituency
- In office 1981–1993

Personal details
- Born: 27 April 1938 Finistère, France
- Died: 6 October 2019 (aged 81) Brest, France
- Party: Socialist Party

Joseph Gourmelon (27 April 1938 – 6 October 2019) was a French politician who served as a deputy.
