= Philippe Fait =

French politician (born 1969)

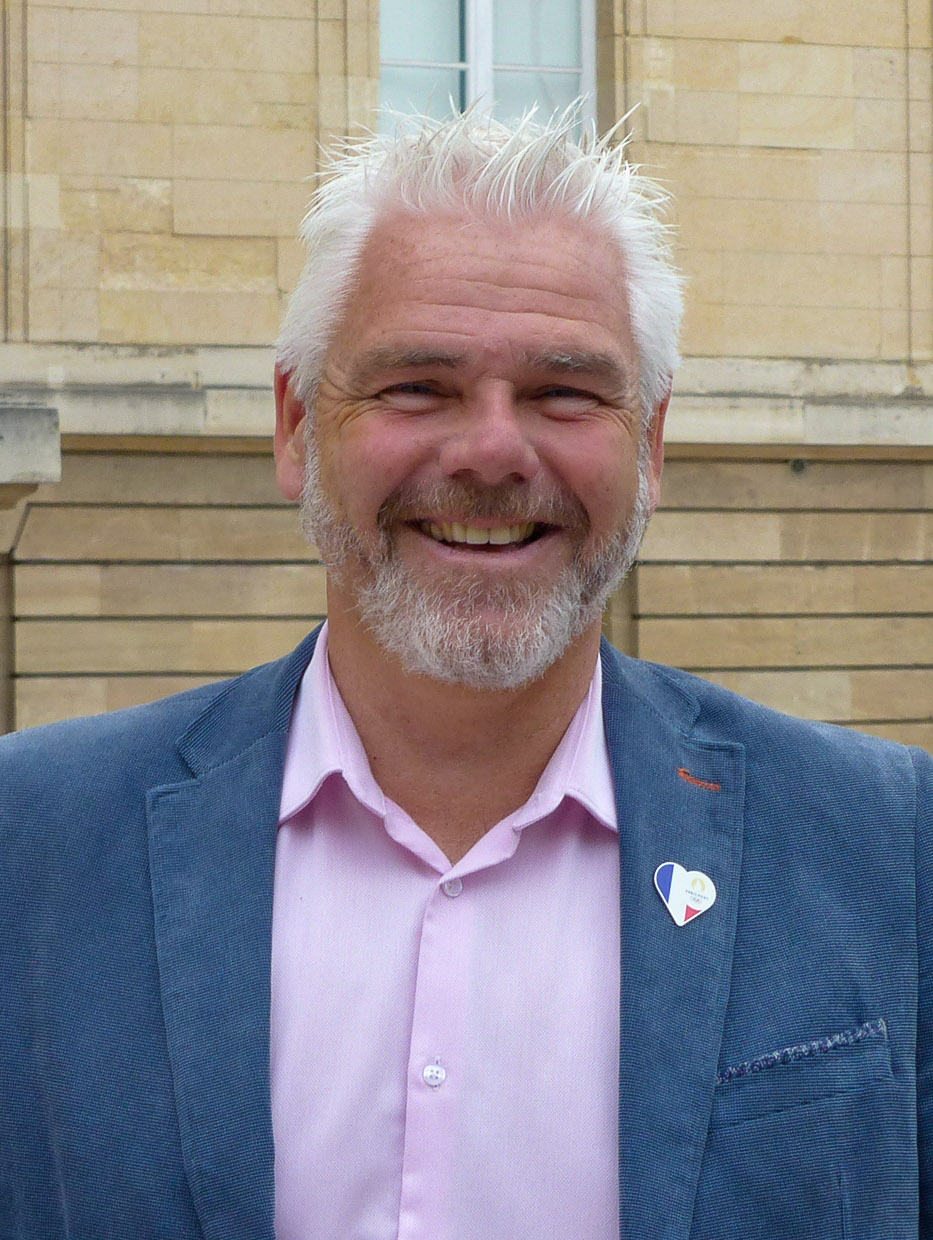

Member of the National Assembly for Pas-de-Calais's 4th constituency
- Incumbent
- Assumed office 22 June 2022
- Preceded by: Robert Therry

Member of the Departmental Council of Pas-de-Calais for the Canton of Étaples
- Incumbent
- Assumed office 29 March 2015
- Preceded by: Geneviève Margueritte

Mayor of Étaples
- In office 4 April 2014 – 23 July 2022
- Preceded by: Jean-Claude Baheux
- Succeeded by: Franck Tindiller

Personal details
- Born: 24 June 1969 (age 56) Cucq, France
- Party: Renaissance
- Profession: Schoolteacher

Philippe Fait (born 24 June 1969) is a French politician of Renaissance (RE) who has served as a member of the National Assembly for Pas-de-Calais's 4th constituency since 2022.

== Political career ==
Fait was first elected to the National Assembly in the 2022 legislative election, succeeding The Republicans incumbent Robert Therry. He was reelected after the snap 2024 legislative election.
