= Graziella Melchior =

French politician

Graziella Melchior is a French politician representing Renaissance (RE). She was elected to the French National Assembly on 18 June 2017, representing Finistère's 5th constituency. She graduated from ESC Bretagne Brest.

== See also ==
- 2017 French legislative election
