= Loc-Eguiner-Saint-Thégonnec =

Loc-Eguiner-Saint-Thégonnec Logeginer-Sant-Tegoneg
- Part of Saint-Thégonnec Loc-Eguiner
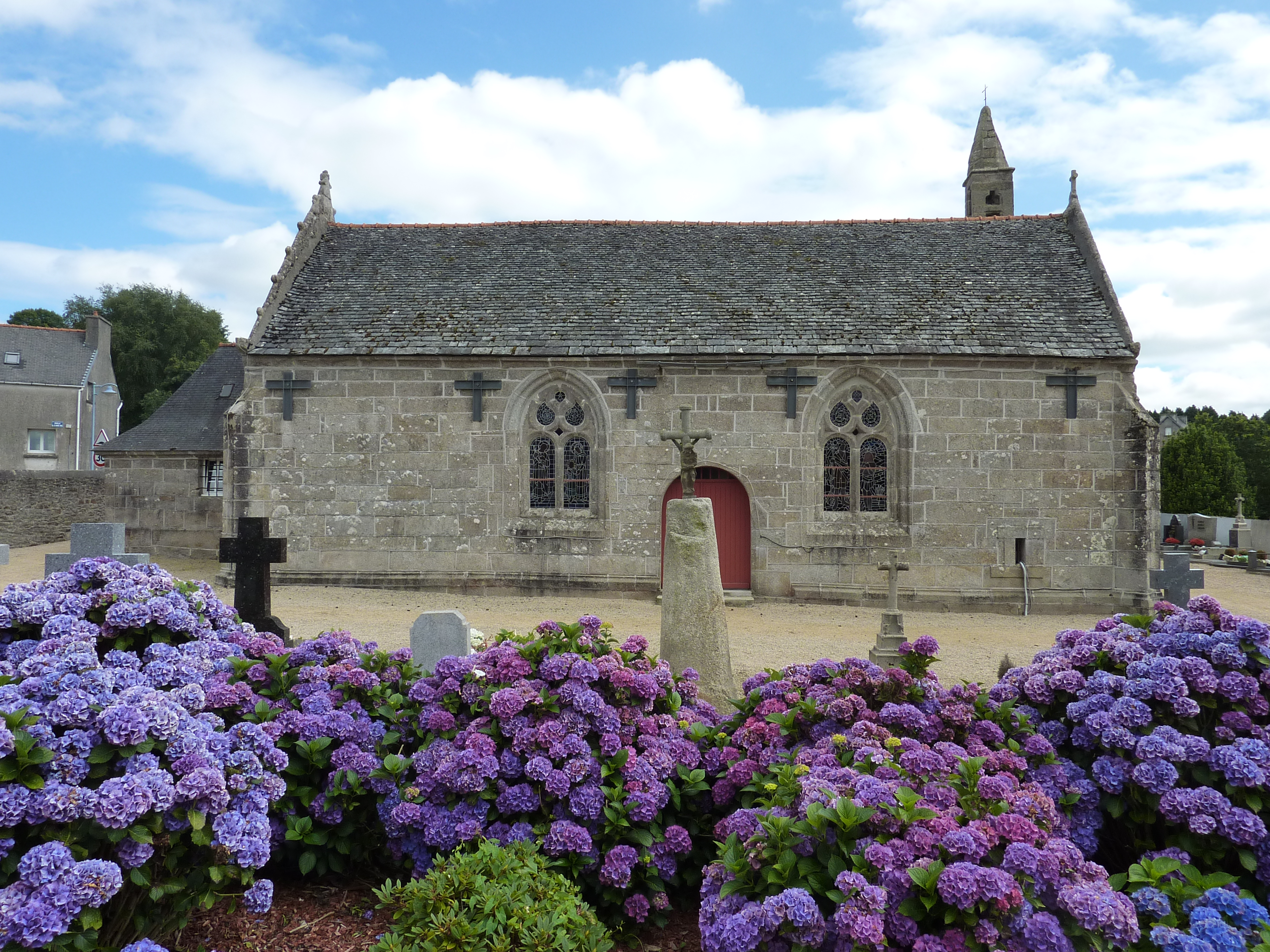
- The church in Loc-Eguiner-Saint-Thégonnec
- Location of Loc-Eguiner-Saint-Thégonnec
- Location within France Location within Brittany
- Coordinates: 48°27′49″N 3°58′06″W
- Country: France
- Region: Brittany
- Department: Finistère
- Arrondissement: Morlaix
- Canton: Morlaix
- Commune: Saint-Thégonnec Loc-Eguiner
- Area^{1}: 8.02 km^{2} (3.10 sq mi)
- Highest elevation: 181 m (594 ft)
- Lowest elevation: 83 m (272 ft)
- Population (2023): 330
  - Density: 41/km^{2} (110/sq mi)
- Time zone: UTC+01:00 (CET)
  - Summer (DST): UTC+02:00 (CEST)
- Postal code: 29410
- ^{1} French Land Register data, which excludes lakes, ponds, glaciers > 1 km^{2} (0.386 sq mi or 247 acres) and river estuaries.

Loc-Eguiner-Saint-Thégonnec (French pronunciation: [lɔk eɡinɛʁ sɛ̃ teɡɔnɛk]; Breton: Logeginer-Sant-Tegoneg) is a former commune in the Finistère department of Brittany in north-western France. On 1 January 2016, it was merged into the new commune Saint-Thégonnec Loc-Eguiner. Inhabitants of Loc-Eguiner-Saint-Thégonnec are called in French Éguinériens.

== See also ==
- Communes of the Finistère department
