= Lanhouarneau =

Lanhouarneau Lanhouarne
- Commune
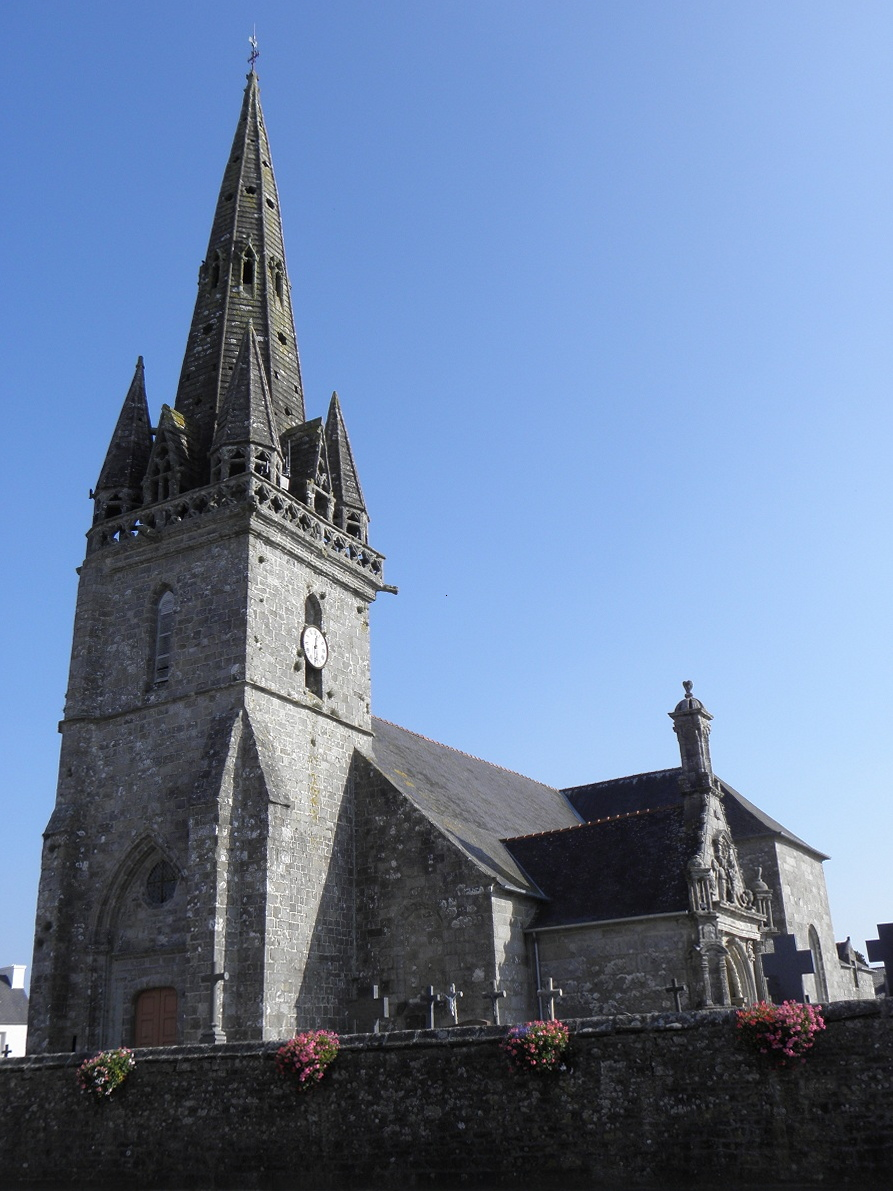
- The church of Saint-Hervé, in Lanhouarneau

- Coat of arms
- Location of Lanhouarneau
- Location within France Location within Brittany
- Coordinates: 48°34′54″N 4°12′32″W
- Country: France
- Region: Brittany
- Department: Finistère
- Arrondissement: Morlaix
- Canton: Saint-Pol-de-Léon

Government
  - Mayor (2020–2026): Éric Pennec
- Area^{1}: 17.69 km^{2} (6.83 sq mi)
- Highest elevation: 106 m (348 ft)
- Lowest elevation: 17 m (56 ft)
- Population (2023): 1,282
  - Density: 72.47/km^{2} (187.7/sq mi)
- Time zone: UTC+01:00 (CET)
  - Summer (DST): UTC+02:00 (CEST)
- INSEE/Postal code: 29111 /29430
- ^{1} French Land Register data, which excludes lakes, ponds, glaciers > 1 km^{2} (0.386 sq mi or 247 acres) and river estuaries.

Lanhouarneau (Breton: Lanhouarne) is a commune in the Finistère department of Brittany in north-western France.

== Population ==
Inhabitants of Lanhouarneau are called in French Lanhouarnéens.

Historical population

Year	Pop.	±% p.a.
1793	2,736	—
1800	2,108	−3.66%
1806	1,863	−2.04%
1821	1,712	−0.56%
1831	1,134	−4.04%
1836	1,057	−1.40%
1841	1,241	+3.26%
1846	1,368	+1.97%
1851	1,345	−0.34%
1856	1,182	−2.55%
1861	1,337	+2.50%
1866	1,292	−0.68%
1872	1,268	−0.31%
1876	1,215	−1.06%
1881	1,178	−0.62%
1886	1,206	+0.47%
1891	1,204	−0.03%
1896	1,256	+0.85%
1901	1,239	−0.27%

Year	Pop.	±% p.a.
1906	1,328	+1.40%
1911	1,340	+0.18%
1921	1,512	+1.21%
1926	1,521	+0.12%
1931	1,389	−1.80%
1936	1,334	−0.80%
1946	1,280	−0.41%
1954	1,107	−1.80%
1962	1,112	+0.06%
1968	1,058	−0.83%
1975	1,029	−0.40%
1982	1,032	+0.04%
1990	959	−0.91%
1999	903	−0.67%
2007	1,032	+1.68%
2012	1,249	+3.89%
2017	1,308	+0.93%
2023	1,282	−0.33%

Source: EHESS and INSEE (1968-2023)

== See also ==
- Communes of the Finistère department
