= Departmental Council of Finistère =

Departmental legislature in France

Departmental Council of Finistère Conseil départemental du Finistère

Leadership
- President: Maël de Calan, SL since 1 July 2021

Structure
- Seats: 54
- Political groups: Government (28): DVD (19); LR (6); RE (1); SL (1); UDI (1); Opposition (26): PS (12); DVG (7); PCF (3); PLB (2); LÉ (1); ND (1); www.finistere.fr

The Departmental Council of Finistère (French: Conseil Départemental du Finistère, Breton: Kuzul-departamant Penn-ar-Bed) is the deliberative assembly of the Finistère department in the region of Brittany. It consists of 54 members (general councilors) from 27 cantons.

The President of the General Council is Maël de Calan.

== Vice-Presidents ==
The President of the Departmental Council is assisted by 12 vice-presidents chosen from among the departmental advisers. Each of them has a delegation of authority.

List of vice-presidents of the Finistère Departmental Council (as of 2021)
Order	Name	Party	Canton	Delegation
1st	Jocelyne Poitevin	UCD	Douarnenez	Social action
2nd	Jacques Gouerou	UCD	Crozon	Economy
3rd	Véronique Bourbigot	UCD	Brest-4	Youth, college and Breton language
4th	Gilles Mounier	UCD	Saint-Renan	Territories
5th	Viviane Bervas	DVD	Landerneau	Environmental and ecological transition
6th	Stéphane Le Doaré	UCD	Pont-l'Abbé	Infrastructures, digital and roads
7th	Nathalie Carrot-Tanneau	UCD	Pont-l'Abbé	Disability
8th	Alain Le Grand	UCD	Fouesnant	Human resources and social action
9th	Lédie le Hir	UCD	Lesneven	Finances
10th	Didier Guillon	UCD	Douarnenez	Housing
11th	Emmanuelle Tournier	UC	Brest-3	Associations and sports
12th	Raymond Messager	UCD	Briec	Rurality

== See also ==
- Finistère
- General councils of France
