= Hugues Portelli =

French politician

Senator of Val-d'Oise
- In office 1 October 2004 – 1 October 2017

Mayor of Ermont
- In office 19 December 1996 – 26 May 2020

Personal details
- Born: 22 December 1947 (age 77) Constantine, Algeria
- Political party: The Republicans
- Children: Florence Portelli
- Profession: University professor

Hugues Portelli (born 22 December 1947) is a member of the Senate of France, representing the Val-d'Oise department. He is a member of the Union for a Popular Movement.

Portelli is also the mayor of Ermont, a city located in the North of Paris (Val-d'Oise department) as well as a Professor of Political science and Constitutional Law at the prestigious Panthéon-Assas University.
