= Pierre-Yves Cadalen =

French politician (born 1992)

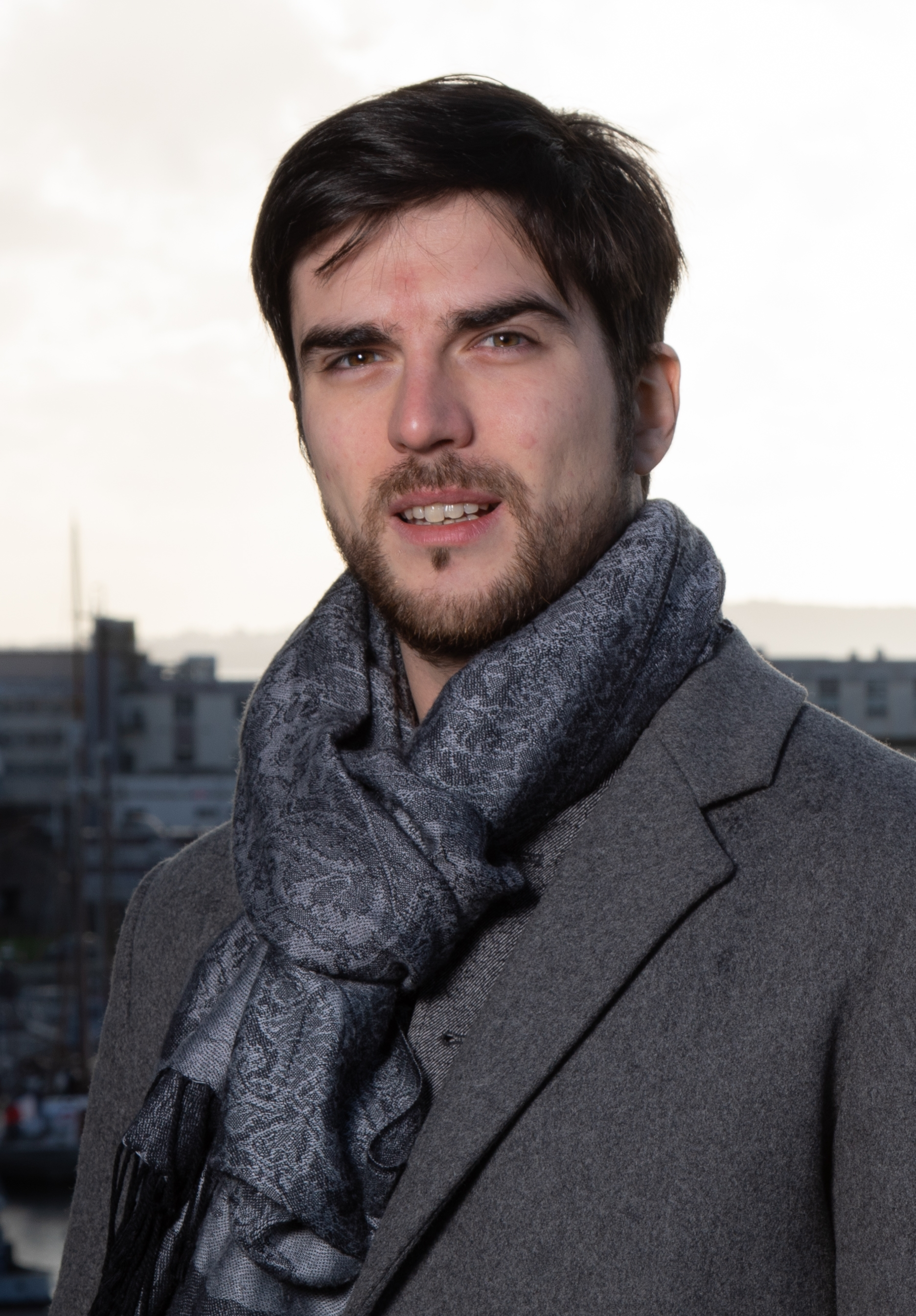
- Pierre-Yves Cadalen in 2019

Member of the National Assembly for Finistère's 2nd constituency
- Incumbent
- Assumed office 8 July 2024
- Preceded by: Jean-Charles Larsonneur

Personal details
- Born: 9 July 1992 (age 34) Brest, France
- Party: La France Insoumise (since 2016)
- Other political affiliations: Left Party (formerly); Socialist Party (formerly)
- Education: Sciences Po

Pierre-Yves Cadalen (born 9 July 1992) is a French politician of La France Insoumise. He was elected member of the National Assembly for Finistère's 2nd constituency in 2024. He is a member of the Foreign Affairs Committee.

== Early life and career ==
Cadalen earned his Baccalauréat in his native city of Brest with a mention très bien in 2010 and then studied at Sciences Po, where he joined its Socialist Party branch. He joined the Left Party in 2013, and in 2015 was elected as a spokesperson for the Mouvement pour la 6e République, advocating for a French Sixth Republic. He was a candidate for Finistère's 2nd constituency in 2017 and 2022.
