= Jean-Charles Larsonneur =

French politician

Member of the National Assembly for Finistère's 2nd constituency
- In office 21 June 2017 – 9 June 2024
- Preceded by: Patricia Adam
- Succeeded by: Pierre-Yves Cadalen

Personal details
- Born: 24 January 1984 (age 42) Brest, France
- Party: Centrist Alliance; Renaissance
- Education: Sciences Po Lille; University of Kent; College of Europe; Pantheon-Sorbonne University
- Profession: Diplomat

Jean-Charles Larsonneur (born 24 January 1984) is a French politician representing La République En Marche! (LREM) who has been serving as a member of the French National Assembly between 2017 and 2024, representing the department of Finistère.

== Early life and education ==
In 2006, Larsonneur graduated in European Affairs at Sciences Po Lille and in Philosophy, Politics and Economics (PPE) at the University of Kent in Canterbury. He then studied at the College of Europe in Bruges, where he graduated in 2007 with a Master's degree in European Economics and Law. In 2011, he also obtained a Master's degree in Public Affairs at the University of Paris 1 Pantheon-Sorbonne.

== Early career ==
From 2008 to 2009, Larsonneur taught European History and Political Philosophy at the University of Greenland in Nuuk, as part of the International Volunteer in Administration (VIA) program at the French Embassy in Denmark.

After passing an entry examination, Larsonneur joined the Ministry of Europe and Foreign Affairs as a career diplomat in 2011. He served as a political adviser in charge of commercial diplomacy in the Directorate on European Affairs, relations with Brazil and South America, and NATO partnerships from 2011 to 2013.

In addition to his work as a diplomat, Larsonneur taught European affairs at the ÉNA preparatory classes at École normale supérieure (ENS).

== Political career ==
In parliament, Larsonneur serves on the Defence Committee. In addition to his committee assignments, he is a member of the French-Danish Parliamentary Friendship Group, the French-Irish Parliamentary Friendship Group and the French-Malian Parliamentary Friendship Group.

In late 2019, Larsonneur was one of 17 members of the Defence Committee who co-signed a letter to Prime Minister Édouard Philippe in which they warned that the 365 million euro ($406 million) sale of aerospace firm Groupe Latécoère to U.S. fund Searchlight Capital raised “questions about the preservation of know-how and France’s defence industry base” and urged government intervention.

In the 2022 French legislative election, he ran as a dissident La République En Marche! candidate, standing opposed to Ensemble Citoyens.

== Political positions ==
In July 2019, Larsonneur voted in favour of the French ratification of the European Union’s Comprehensive Economic and Trade Agreement (CETA) with Canada.

== See also ==
- 2017 French legislative election
