= Agnès Le Brun =

French politician

Agnès Le Brun MEP
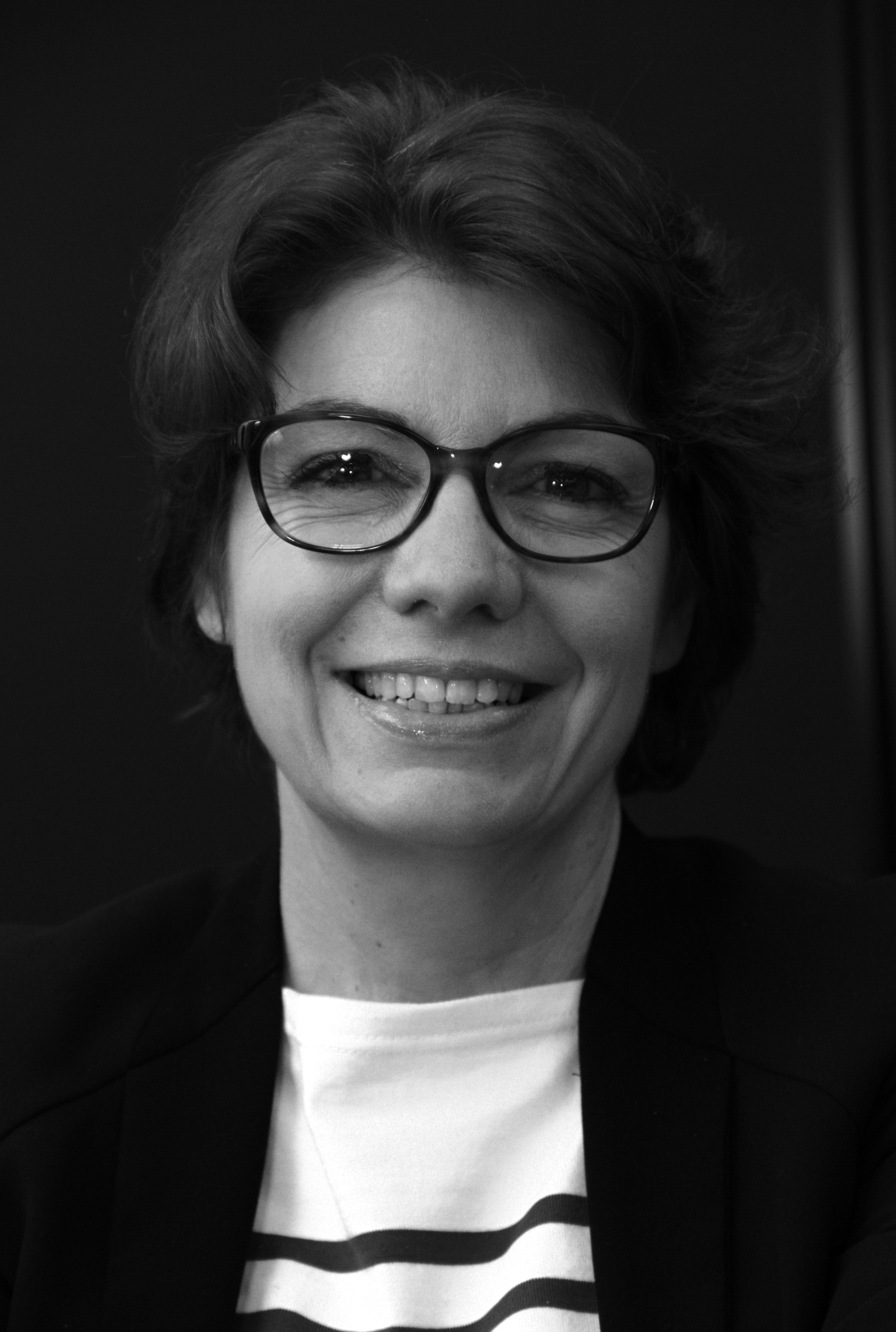

Member of the European Parliament
- In office 1 January 2011 – 1 July 2014

Personal details
- Born: 28 December 1961 (age 64) Chaumont-en-Vexin, Oise, France
- Party: Union for a Popular Movement; The Republicans
- Education: University of Rennes 2 – Upper Brittany

Agnès Le Brun (born 28 December 1961) is a French politician who served as a Member of the European Parliament from 2011 to 2014. Born in Chaumont-en-Vexin, she grew up in rural Brittany and graduated from the University of Rennes 2 – Upper Brittany, obtaining a Master's Degree in Classics. She then moved to Morlaix, where she became a teacher.

Le Brun began her political career in 2001 when she was nominated for a local position by party leaders. In 2008, she again ran for Finistère's local council, as well as mayor of Morlaix against Michel Le Goff. She won with 52.01% in what was considered an upset victory. She was re-elected to the mayorship in 2014, serving her second six-year term through 2020. A year after becoming mayor, Le Brun ran in the European Parliament elections out of the West France constituency, where she finished fourth; the top three members of the Union for a Popular Movement party were elected to Parliament. In January 2011, she was appointed to the European Parliament to replace Christophe Béchu, who became President of the Pays de la Loire region.

While in Parliament, she served as a member of the European People's Party group, and served on the Committee on Agriculture and Rural Development and the Subcommittee on Human Rights, serving as Vice President of the latter. She also ran against Marylise Lebranchu, who also served as former mayor of Morlaix, as a member of the National Assembly out of Finistère's 4th constituency, and lost that race 61% to 39%.
