= Florence Portelli =

French politician

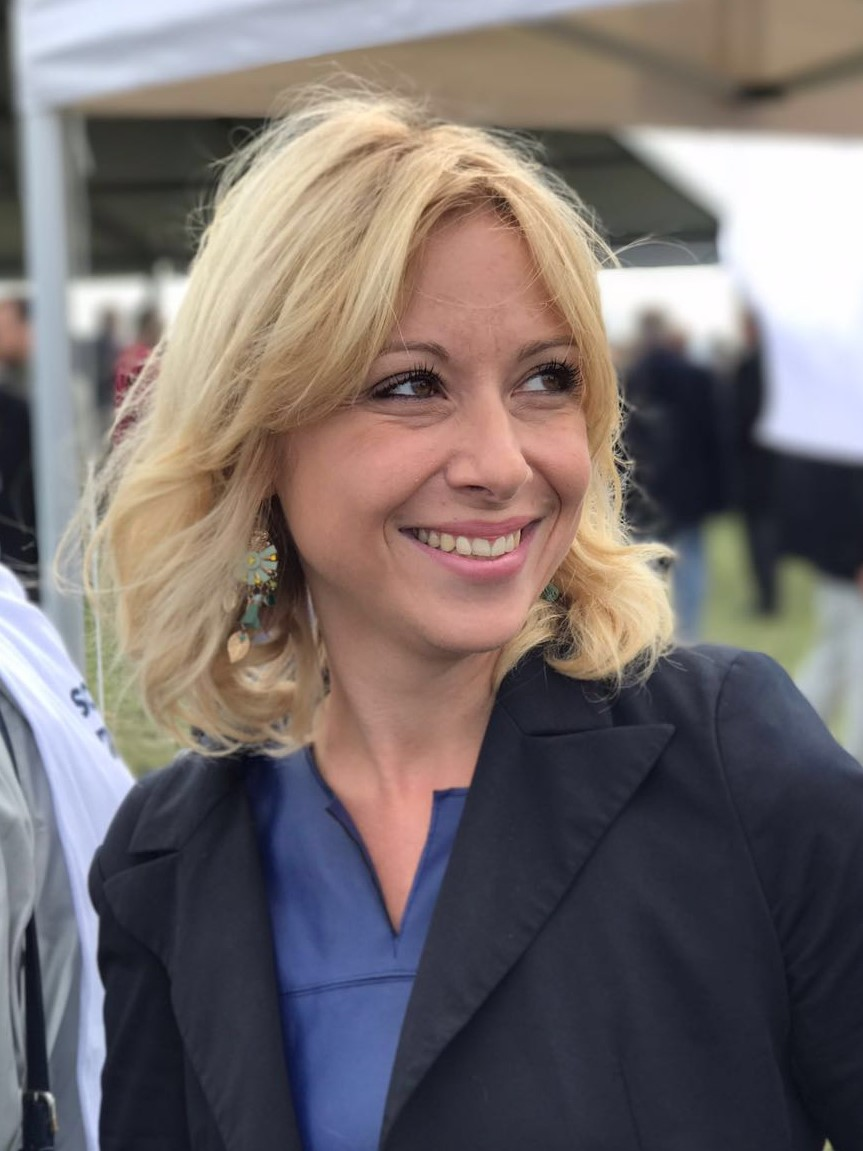

Mayor of Taverny
- Incumbent
- Assumed office 4 April 2014

Regional Councillor of Île-de-France
- Incumbent
- Assumed office 18 December 2015

Personal details
- Born: 23 March 1978 (age 48) Argenteuil, France
- Party: The Republicans (2015–2019, since 2021)
- Other political affiliations: Union for a Popular Movement (Before 2015)
- Education: Panthéon-Assas University

Florence Portelli (born 23 March 1978 in Argenteuil) is a French politician who has been serving as Mayor of Taverny since 2014. She has also been a regional councillor of Île-de-France since 2015.

A longtime member of The Republicans, Portelli served as François Fillon's spokeswoman during his presidential election campaign in 2017. She was a candidate for the presidency of The Republicans that year.

== Early life and education ==
Portelli is the daughter of senator Hugues Portelli and Marie Bosi. She enrolled at the Panthéon-Assas University where she graduated with a M.A. in public law of the Sorbonne Law School and, later, with a degree of Paris Institute of Criminology and Criminal Law.

== Political career ==
In 2014, Portelli was elected Mayor of Taverny. As part of the campaign led by Valérie Pécresse, she became regional councillor of Île-de-France in the 2015 elections.

In 2015, Portelli was appointed as member of the Republicans' political bureau by its chairman Nicolas Sarkozy and became the party's national spokesperson on cultural affairs.

Having supported François Fillon during the 2012 leadership election, Portelli was selected as spokesperson for his 2017 presidential campaign, and later as The Republicans' campaign spokeswoman for the 2017 French legislative election, in the team led by François Baroin.

Ahead of the Republicans' 2017 leadership elections, Portelli declared her candidacy on 29 August 2017, arguing that she wanted to work "for the right to recover its pride", to "return to activists the place that they should have in the party", and "a refoundation, a democratized functioning, a radical change to statutes and clarification of the ideological line of the party". She excludes any possibility of cooperating with the extreme right, argues for the need to "reinforce" immigration control, and supports the definitive exclusion of LR members of "The Constructives", saying they had "excluded themselves", but invited those who hoped that its creation would propel the right to reform to "to return to the fold," believing them mistaken. In the final vote, she lost against Laurent Wauquiez.

In February 2018, Portelli was appointed General secretary of "Libres !", a movement founded by Valérie Pécresse and affiliated with the Republicans.

In 2023, the Republicans' chairman Éric Ciotti appointed Portelli as member of his shadow cabinet and put her in charge of cultural affairs.

In the Republicans' 2025 leadership election, Portelli endorsed Laurent Wauquiez to succeed Ciotti as the party's new chair and joined his campaign team.

== Personal life ==
Portelli has been playing piano since the age of six and is an avid jazz lover. In 2016, she was elected President of the Orchestre national d'Île-de-France, a French symphony orchestra

== Works ==
- Franc-parler, Éditions du Cerf, 2024, 160 p. (ISBN 978-2-204-15392-8).
