= Léonce Deprez =

French footballer and politician (1927-2017)

Personal information
- Date of birth: 10 July 1927
- Place of birth: Béthune, France
- Date of death: 7 July 2017 (aged 89)
- Place of death: Rang-du-Fliers, France

International career
Years	Team	Apps	(Gls)
- France

Léonce Deprez (10 July 1927 – 7 July 2017) was a French footballer and politician. He competed in the men's tournament at the 1952 Summer Olympics. He was Mayor of Touquet-Paris-Plage from July 1969 to June 1995 and from March 2001 to March 2008.
