= Finistère's 5th constituency =

Constituency of the National Assembly of France

5th constituency of Finistère
- inline Constituency of the National Assembly of France

- Constituency in department

- Finistère in France
- Deputy: Graziella Melchior; RE
- Department: Finistère
- Cantons: Guipavas, Landerneau, Landivisiau, Lannilis, Lesneven, Plouescat

The 5th constituency of Finistère is a French legislative constituency in the Finistère département. Like the other 576 French constituencies, it elects one MP using the two-round system, with a run-off if no candidate receives over 50% of the vote in the first round.

== Historic representation ==
Election	Member	Party
1988	Charles Miossec	RPR
1993	Charles Miossec	RPR
1997	Charles Miossec	RPR
2002	Jacques Le Guen	UMP
2007	Jacques Le Guen	UMP
2012	Chantal Guittet	PS
2017	Graziella Melchior	LREM
2022	Graziella Melchior	LREM
2024	Graziella Melchior	RE

== Election results ==
=== 2024 ===
Candidate	Party	Alliance	First round			Second round		
Candidate	Party	Alliance	Votes	%	+/–	Votes	%	+/–
Graziella Melchior	RE	ENS	21,567	30.30	-0.96	46,270	68.07	+13.49
Gladys Grelaud	PCF	NFP	19,371	27.22	-5.14	WITHDREW		
Renée Thomaïdis	RN		18,884	26.53	+13.28	21,704	31.93	N/A
Félix Briant	LR		7,943	11.16	-5.89			
Marcel Berrou	REG		1,807	2.54	N/A			
Alexandre Martin	DLF		641	0.90	N/A			
Christian Cajean	LO		553	0.78	-0.45			
Dominique Lerestif	DIV		402	0.56	N/A			
Valid votes			71,168	97.86	-0.42	67,974	94.09	-4.02
Blank votes			1,119	1.54	+0.25	3,291	4.56	+3.27
Null votes			437	0.60	+0.17	982	1.36	+0.93
Turnout			72,724	73.64	+21.90	72,247	73.15	+21.41
Abstentions			26,027	26.36	-21.90	26,524	26.85	-21.41
Registered voters			98,751			98,771		
Source: Ministry of the Interior, Le Monde
Result						RE HOLD		

=== 2022 ===
Legislative Election 2022: Finistère's 5th constituency
Party	Candidate	Votes	%	±%
LREM (Ensemble)	Graziella Melchior	15,555	31.26	-4.52
PS (NUPÉS)	Nathalie Sarrabezolles	14,444	29.03	-0.81
LR (UDC)	Félix Briant	8,484	17.05	N/A
RN	Renée Thomaidis	6,591	13.25	+6.60
UDB	Angélique De Cecco	1,657	3.33	N/A
REC	Thierry-Hubert Lolliérou	1,329	2.67	N/A
Others	N/A	1,695	3.41	
Turnout		49,755	51.74	−4.10
2nd round result
LREM (Ensemble)	Graziella Melchior	25,585	54.58	+0.69
PS (NUPÉS)	Nathalie Sarrabezolles	21,287	45.42	N/A
Turnout		46,872	50.58	+4.72
LREM hold				

=== 2017 ===
Candidate	Label	First round		Second round	
Candidate	Label	Votes	%	Votes	%
Graziella Melchior	REM	18,624	35.78	20,957	53.89
Patrick Leclerc	DVD	11,207	21.53	17,930	46.11
Chantal Guittet	PS	7,795	14.97		
Pascale Marchand	FI	5,382	10.34		
Renée Thomaïdis	FN	3,464	6.65		
Rosalie Salaün	ECO	1,777	3.41		
Marcel Berrou	REG	1,474	2.83		
Jean-Paul Barré	DLF	671	1.29		
Pierre-Yves Liziar	PCF	583	1.12		
Maxime Bernas	REG	357	0.69		
Odile Croguennoc	DVG	267	0.51		
Françoise Chauveau	EXG	253	0.49		
Dorian Floch	DIV	203	0.39		
Votes		52,057	100.00	38,887	100.00
Valid votes		52,057	98.66	38,887	89.75
Blank votes		520	0.99	3,380	7.80
Null votes		186	0.35	1,063	2.45
Turnout		52,763	55.84	43,330	45.86
Abstentions		41,731	44.16	51,161	54.14
Registered voters		94,494		94,491	
Source: Ministry of the Interior

=== 2012 ===
2012 legislative election in Finistere's 5th constituency
Candidate	Party	First round		Second round	
Candidate	Party	Votes	%	Votes	%
Chantal Guittet	PS	23,069	41.97%	30,761	57.10%
Jacques Le Guen	UMP	19,534	35.54%	23,107	42.90%
Eric Dechamps	FN	3,766	6.85%		
Gaëlle Rolland-Chapelain	EELV	3,188	5.80%		
Isabelle Mazelin	FG	2,417	4.40%		
Alain Somme	MoDem	2,130	3.88%		
Michael Lo Verso	JB (BNAFET)	377	0.69%		
Françoise Chauveau	LO	289	0.53%		
Marie-Cécile Jacq	PP	191	0.35%		
Valid votes		54,961	98.66%	53,868	97.55%
Spoilt and null votes		748	1.34%	1,353	2.45%
Votes cast / turnout		55,709	61.13%	55,221	60.60%
Abstentions		35,422	38.87%	35,904	39.40%
Registered voters		91,131	100.00%	91,125	100.00%

=== 2007 ===
Legislative Election 2007: Finistère's 5th constituency
Party	Candidate	Votes	%	±%
UMP	Jacques Le Guen	28,002	49.08	
PS	Chantal Guittet	16,026	28.09	
MoDem	Emmanuel Morucci	5,026	8.81	
LV	Christophe Winckler	2,572	4.51	
Far left	Yannick Herve	2,164	3.79	
Others	N/A	3,266		
Turnout		57,713	65.00	
2nd round result
UMP	Jacques Le Guen	29,760	54.80	
PS	Chantal Guittet	24,549	45.20	
Turnout		55,364	62.35	
UMP hold				

=== 2002 ===
Legislative Election 2002: Finistère's 5th constituency
Party	Candidate	Votes	%	±%
UMP	Jacques Le Guen	29,415	51.99	
PS	Jean-Pierre Thomin	17,503	30.94	
LV	Gerard Borvon	2,878	5.09	
FN	Bernard Pacreau	2,589	4.58	
PCF	Isabelle Mazelin	1,222	2.16	
Others	N/A	2,969		
Turnout		57,409	67.89	
UMP hold				

=== 1997 ===
Legislative Election 1997: Finistère's 5th constituency
Party	Candidate	Votes	%	±%
RPR	Charles Miossec	23,523	43.03	
PS	Jean-Pierre Thomin	16,530	30.24	
FN	Bernard Pacreau	4,375	8.00	
LV	Gérard Borvon	3,139	5.74	
PCF	Ronan Tanguy	2,534	4.64	
DVD	Marie-FRance Cosnard	1,751	3.20	
GE	Bernard Bruillot	1,637	2.99	
DIV	Annaig Louis	1,180	2.16	
Turnout		57,148	71.55	
2nd round result
RPR	Charles Miossec	30,884	54.29	
PS	Jean-Pierre Thomin	25,998	45.71	
Turnout		59,213	74.15	
RPR hold				

== Sources ==
- Official results of French elections from 1998: "Résultats électoraux officiels en France" (in French). Archived from the original on 20 December 2011.
