= Pierre Maille =

French politician

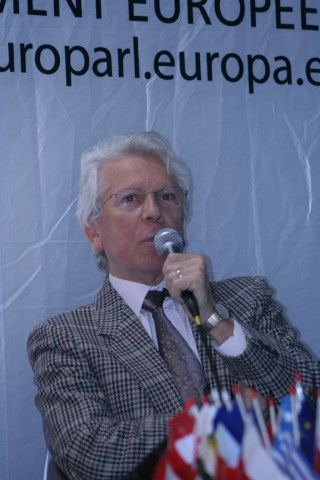

Mayor of Brest
- In office 1989–2001
- Preceded by: Georges Kerbrat
- Succeeded by: François Cuillandre

Personal details
- Born: 14 June 1947 (age 79) Fréjus, France
- Party: Socialist Party
- Education: ENS Cachan

Pierre Maille (born 14 June 1947) is a French politician.

Maille was Mayor of Brest from 1982 to 1983, succeeding Francis Le Blé, who died in office in 1982, and from 1989 to 2001. He belongs to the French Socialist Party, and since 1998 has led the general council of the department of Finistère.
