= Sandrine Le Feur =

French politician

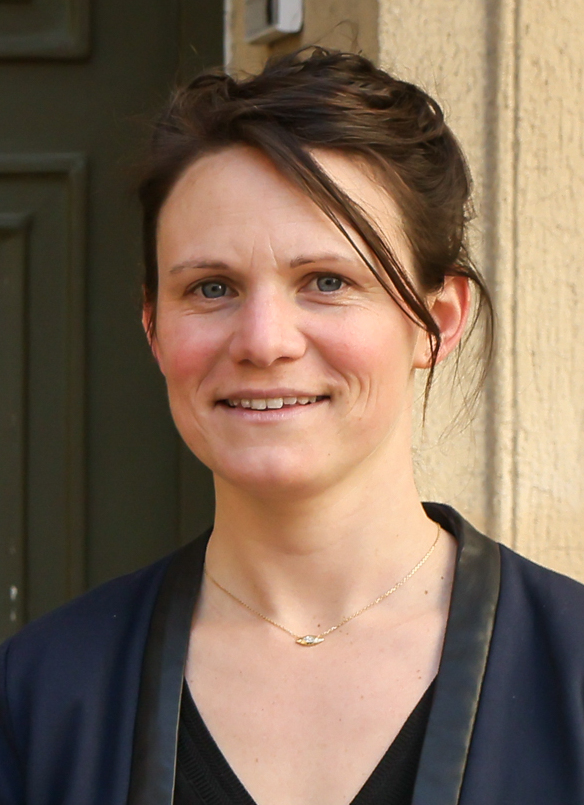
Sandrine Le Feur in 2025

Sandrine Le Feur (born 18 March 1991) is a French organic farmer and politician of Renaissance (RE) who has been serving as a member of the National Assembly since the 2017 elections, representing the department of Finistère.

== Political career ==
In parliament Le Feur serves as member of the Committee on Sustainable Development and Spatial Planning. In addition to her committee assignments she is an alternate member of the Franco-German Parliamentary Assembly. In June 2024 she announced that she would be restanding for election to the new parliament on 30 June and 7 July.

== Political positions ==
In 2019 Le Feur was one of nine LREM members who voted against her parliamentary group's majority and opposed the French ratification of the European Union’s Comprehensive Economic and Trade Agreement (CETA) with Canada.

In 2020 Le Feur was one of ten LREM members who voted against her parliamentary group's majority and opposed a much discussed security bill drafted by her colleagues Alice Thourot and Jean-Michel Fauvergue that helps, among other measures, curtail the filming of police forces.

== See also ==
- 2017 French legislative election
