= How the Poor Die =

1946 essay by George Orwell

"How the Poor Die" is an essay first published in 1946 in Now by the English author George Orwell. Orwell gives an anecdotal account of his experiences in a French public hospital that triggers a contemplation of hospital literature in the context of 19th-century medicine.

== Background ==
In 1928, Orwell went to Paris for 18 months. In March 1929 he was feeling unwell and spent two weeks in the Hôpital Cochin, rue Faubourg Saint-Jacques, in the 15th arrondissement of Paris. Ill with the flu, he was treated at the hospital from 7 to 22 March 1929. In the hospital, he continued writing, as he gave it as an address to a publisher. Orwell was subject to bronchial conditions throughout his life, but it is not certain whether he was suffering from influenza or pneumonia. In Paris, he was checked for tuberculosis but was found to be unaffected.

In December 1933, while Orwell was teaching in Uxbridge, he developed pneumonia. He was taken to a cottage hospital at Uxbridge, where his life for a time was believed to be in danger. He was kept in hospital over Christmas and the New Year. When he was discharged in January 1934, he returned to Southwold to convalesce and was supported by his parents for several months. He did not return to teaching.

In 1937, Orwell spent some months on the Republican side in the Spanish Civil War. He was twice hospitalised during the war; once with an infection of his hand and again after he was shot in the throat by a sniper.

== Composition ==
It is not known precisely when the article was written. Peter Davison, editor of Orwell's Collected Works, has suggested a possible history for its composition that places its writing between 1931 and 1936, while Orwell's work revolved around the unemployed, tramps and beggars, and that he reworked it between summer 1940 and spring 1941, submitted it to Horizon, which rejected it possibly because readers would have been unwilling to read about 'how the poor die' at such a time. Finally, a section was retyped and then published in Now, a magazine established by George Woodcock, in November 1946.

== Summary ==
Orwell recounts a tale based on his experiences in a publicly-funded hospital in Paris. The various reception procedures and treatments he receives for pneumonia include bureaucracy, a bath, cupping therapy and a mustard poultice. In the ward, he notes the indifference of the staff to their patients, particularly when they are used as case studies for medical training. The death of numero 57 sets Orwell wondering how lucky it is to die a natural death or rather, as he thinks at the time of writing, and as he thought then, if it is better to die violently and not too old. Orwell sees his experiences in the French hospital and in a Spanish hospital, in stark contrast to the care of that he received in an English cottage hospital.

Orwell gives a historical background of how hospital wards began as casual wards "for lepers and the like to die in" and became places for medical students to learn using the bodies of the poor. In the 19th century, surgery was viewed as a form of sadism, and dissection was possible only with the aid of body-snatchers. Orwell dwells on the literature of medicine in the 19th century, when doctors were given names such as Slasher and Fillgrave, and Orwell particularly recalls In the Children's Hospital: Emmie (1880), a work by Tennyson. All of that accounts for the surviving dread of hospitals among the poor and explains why a sound instinct warns people to keep out of them.

== Extracts ==
Two slatternly nurses had already got the poultice ready, and they lashed it round my chest as tight as a straitjacket while some men who were wandering about the ward in shirt and trousers began to collect round my bed with half-sympathetic grins. I learned later that watching a patient have a mustard poultice was a favourite pastime in the ward. These things are normally applied for a quarter of an hour and certainly they are funny enough if you don't happen to be the person inside. For the first five minutes the pain is severe, but you believe you can bear it. During the second five minutes this belief evaporates, but the poultice is buckled at the back and you can't get it off. This is the period the onlookers most enjoy. During the last five minutes, I noted a sort of numbness supervenes.

As a non-paying patient, in the uniform nightshirt, you were primarily a specimen, a thing I did not resent but could never quite get used to.

In the public wards of hospitals you see horrors that you don't seem to meet with among people who manage to die in their own homes, as though certain diseases only attacked people at the lower income levels. But it is a fact that you would not in any English hospitals see some of the things I saw in the Hôpital X. This business of dying like animals, for instance, with nobody interested, the death not even noticed till the morning—this happened more than once.

== Postscript ==
In summer 1946, Orwell decamped to Jura, an island in the west of Scotland. A boating accident did little for his health. In December 1947, he was in hospital in Glasgow. Tuberculosis was diagnosed, and the request for permission to import streptomycin to treat Orwell went as far as Aneurin Bevan. After treatment, Orwell was able to return to Jura by the end of July 1948.

In 1948, Bevan, formerly Orwell's colleague at Tribune and now Minister of Health in the Labour government, instigated the British National Health Service as publicly-funded medical provision for all.

In January 1949, in a very weak condition, Orwell was taken to a sanatorium in Gloucestershire, a series of small wooden chalets or huts near Stroud. Visitors were shocked by Orwell's appearance and concerned by the shortcomings and the ineffectiveness of the treatment. In late summer, Orwell was removed to University College Hospital in London. In October he married Sonia Brownell, who prepared plans to take him to the Swiss Alps. Orwell was getting weaker by the beginning of 1950. Sonia spent most of 20 January with Orwell in his private ward but left in the early evening to have dinner with Lucian Freud and another friend. A visitor came and left a parcel outside the room in which Orwell was lying alone. Sometime early on Saturday morning, an artery burst in his lungs, and a few moments later he was dead, aged 46. Controversy surrounds Sonia's activities. Some say that she was at a nightclub and inaccessible. Others claim that at the end of the evening having had dinner with her friends, she called the hospital and came back distraught with the news of Orwell's death.

== See also ==
- Bibliography of George Orwell
