= Order of Saint James of Altopascio =

Italian Christian military order (1070s-1672)

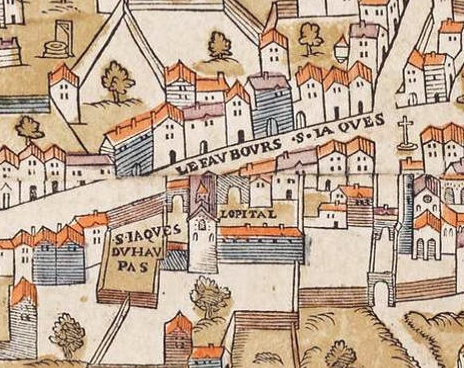
Hospital of Saint James of Altopascio in Paris, from a map of 1550

The Order of Saint James of Altopascio (Italian: Ordine di San Giacomo d'Altopascio or Ordine dei Frati Ospitalieri di San Jacopo), also called the Knights of the Tau (Cavalieri del Tau) or Hospitallers of Saint James, was a military order, perhaps the earliest Christian institution to combine the protection and assistance of pilgrims, the staffing of hospitals, and a military wing. According to American historian Ephraim Emerton, who produced the first systematic study of the Order, "the fame of the house drew visitors, both well and sick, including women in childbirth and infants" from around Italy.

== History ==
=== Foundation ===
The Order was founded by Matilda of Canossa between 1070 and 1080 at Altopascio, a town on the Via Francigena in what is now Tuscany. The earliest datable reference to a hospital edificatus in locus et finibus ubi dicitur Teupascio ("built in the place called Teupascio") is from 1084. Ludovico Muratori thought Teupascio to be an eighth-century corruption of the Latin Altopassus. The variants Taupascio and Topascio have led some to suppose a relationship between the (alternative) name of the town and the Order sometimes known as "of the Tau", after their symbol, which would once have been a common sight in the town. This derivation is highly unlikely, however, and the name appears to be Germanic in origin.

According to the Order's own tradition it was founded between the Palude di Fucecchio, the Lago di Sesto, and the forest of Cerbaie towards 1050 by twelve citizens of nearby Lucca, a tradition which is preserved in a couple of lines of poetry appended to the Italian version of its rule:

La qual casa sia questa dell Ospitale La quale incommincio lo Coro duodenale.	That house which belongs to the hospital Which was founded by the Choir of twelve.

Probably the "choir of twelve" refers to the founding twelve members (brethren, friars, fratres), not to twelve founders. In his Memorie di Pescia, Francesco Galeotti wrote that the Order was founded by a rich and pious personaggio (individual). The Order was dedicated to James the Greater and Egidius. Its head was initially a rector, later a grand master (magister generalis), custos (custodian), warden, and eventually even bore the title Signore d'Altopascio (Lord of Altopascio).

Originally the Order was composed of a few canons charged with caring for pilgrims on their way to Rome or the Holy Land, via Italy, but later it extended its concern to the Way of Saint James. Their headquarters were in the church of the same name, San Giacomo dell' Alto Passo. Their Great Hospital dedicated to Saint James at Altopascio (Domus Hospitalis Sancti Iacobi de Altopassu) is first mentioned in a bull of Innocent III from 1198, though he refers to earlier grants to the hospice by the Bishops of Lucca, whose names indicate that it existed as early as the third quarter of the century. In 1244 the hospice of Altopassus received a confirmation of its properties in Italy from the Emperor Frederick II as part of a program of support for institutions looking after the miserabiles (unfortunate). The emperor forbade the imposition of any tax on the Order or any interference lay or ecclesiastical with its property. The movement of goods as part of the Order's regular business was to go unhindered.

=== Expansion ===
In time the Order came to be charged with safeguarding the roads and the bridges from brigands. The Order also had a bell named "La Smarrita" that was rung each night from a half hour before sunset to a half hour past to help guide any pilgrim wandering in the woods to safety. This custom was still reported in the time of Lami. They maintained a ferry service on the Arno River:

in the territory of Florence and on the high road to Rome, where formerly a heavy tribute was exacted. This road has now been made free by members of the aforesaid Great Hospital and of other hospitals affiliated with it. So that at present all pilgrims and others freely pass there without payment.

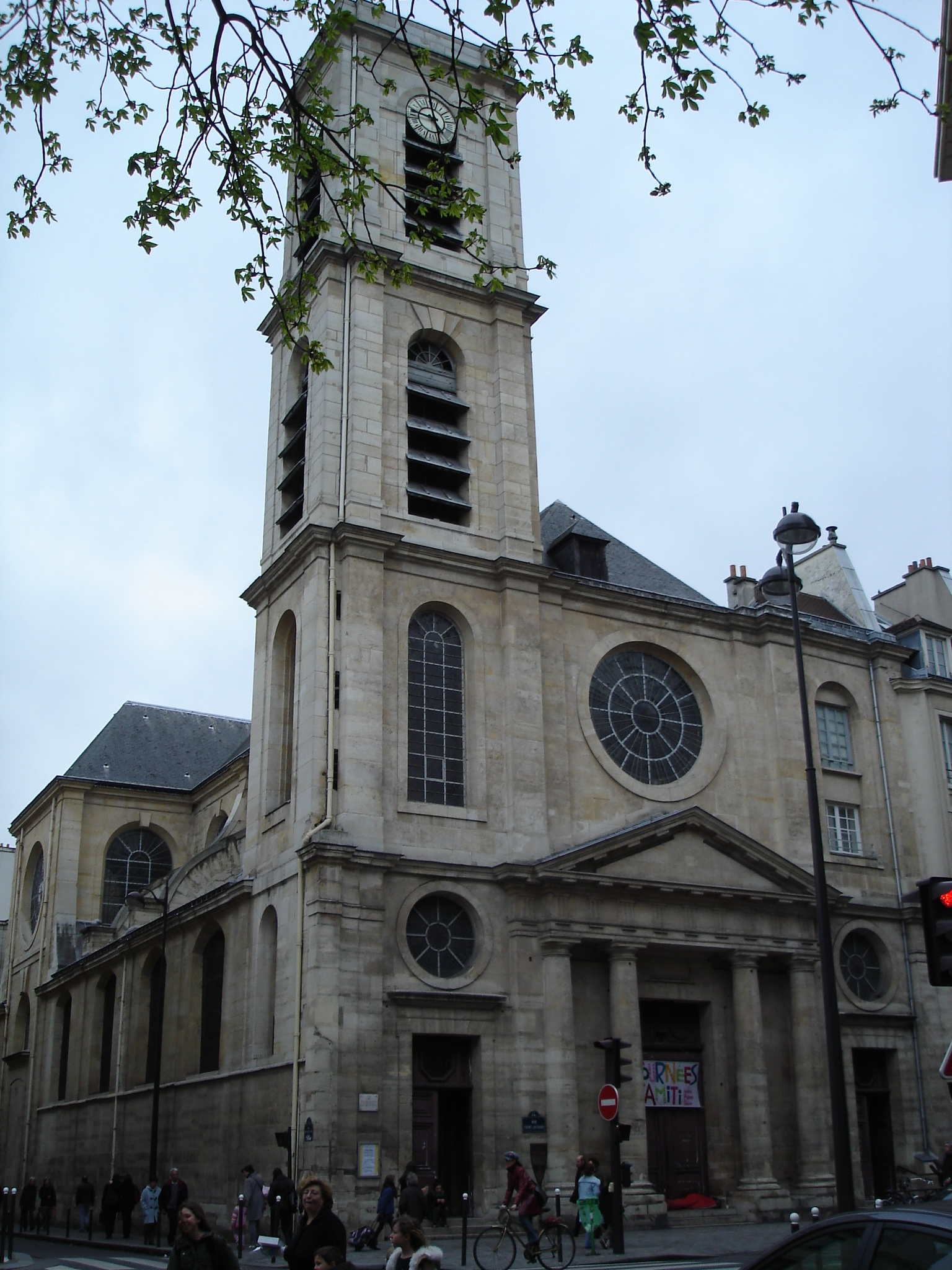
The church of Saint-Jacques-du-Hault-Pas, the first Altopascian foundation in Paris.

The lands from which the Order drew its income were found throughout Tuscany: in the Valdarno (bull of Anastasius IV of 1154), Valdinievole (bull of Alexander III of 1169), and Pistoia and Prato (aforementioned bull of Innocent III of 1198). Eventually the Order spread throughout Tuscany and Italy, reaching first Naples, Sardinia, and Sicily. The Order was eventually internationalised and had reached as far as the Rhône in Provence by the end of the twelfth century. It received endowments in Bavaria, Burgundy, the Dauphiné, England, Flanders, France, Germany, Lorraine, Navarre, Portugal, and Savoy. Each separate body was called a mansio (plural mansiones) on analogy with the Roman relay stations and hospitals abiding by the Order's rule were called obedientiae. Grants to the mansiones of money and land and, in the later Middle Ages, tithes were supervised by the grand master. The heart of the Order was always in Tuscany, however, as its close relationship with the great families of the Republic of Florence shows. There is evidence that in the sixteenth century the Order was exchanging lands in such a way as to build up a compact territory of holdings nearer Altopascio.

The church and hospital of Saint-Jacques-du-Haut-Pas in Paris, subject to the Great Hospital, was founded by Philip IV of France.

=== Suppression ===
The Order was suppressed by the bull Execrabilis issued by Pius II on 18 January 1459 along with five other religiones (religious orders). Their property was transferred to the fledgling Order of Our Lady of Bethlehem founded by that same bull:

Further, we suppress and annul their former ordinances (ordines), the names of their associations, their titles of priority (priorales) and other dignities, and we decree that henceforth they shall be called, held, and named as of that military order of Saint Mary of Bethlehem. Moreover, in this order there shall be brethren and knights and priests as also in the aforesaid Order of Rhodes [Knights of Saint John], and the head of the aforesaid Hospital of Saint Mary of Bethlehem shall be the Master, elected by the brethren in the same way (pariformiter) [as in the Order of Rhodes].

The suppression, however, was imperfectly carried out, or perhaps was never carried out at all. The Order certainly retained some Italian property until, on 14 March 1587, Sixtus V, at the request of the Grand Duke of Tuscany, merged the Order of Altopascio with the Order of Saint Stephen. In France it was finally absorbed into the Order of Saint Lazarus in 1672.

== Organisation ==
=== Rule ===
The Order's rule, the Regola dei Frati di San Jacopo d'Altopascio, was promulgated in ninety-six chapters by Gregory IX in 1239, and was based on the rule of the Knights of Saint John and, more generally, the rule of Saint Augustine. The rule was requested by the brethren. It is unknown if they abided by a different rule before 1239. The Latin rule is preserved in the Archives nationales on twenty-one 8½"x6" pages. It was first published (in part) by the antiquarian Giovanni Lami between 1741 and 1754 and edited (entirely) by Pietro Farfani in 1864 in Italian. A Pescian document of 1358 still referred to the order as "living under the Rule of Saint Augustine".

By a comparison with the Hospitaller rule it is clear that the first twenty-five chapters of the Altopascian rule correspond to the first nineteen chapters from the Hospitaller rule of Raymond du Puy (from 1125–53). Chapters 30–37, which deal with the proper burial of deceased brethren, are probably adapted from the additions made by Jobert of Syria to the Hospitaller rule between 1177 and 1181. Chapters 39–45 are concerned with the care for the sick and were added to the Hospitaller rule by Roger de Moulins in 1181 or 1182. Chapters 47–52 and 76 are derived from the later usances (customs) of the order of Saint John, with chapters 49–52 prescribing the ceremonies for the initiation of brethren and confrati (affiliated persons). Chapters 53–75 are a selection of later Hospitaller esgards (judgements), probably chosen for their relevance to the Altopascian situation. They deal primarily with crime. Chapters 26–29, 38, 46, and 77–96 are not based on the Hospitaller rule.

=== Composition ===
The Order's members appear to have been mostly laymen. References in the Order's rule to fees paid to priests for their services imply that these priests were not members, since the Order's rule elsewhere prohibits private property. In 1324 Marsilius of Padua, in his Defensor pacis, criticised the Papacy for trying to classify as many persons as possible as clerici (clergy), and appears to say that the Order of Altopascio was lay, but the Pope wished to classify it as clerical. Chapter 64 of the Order's rule, however, does refer to brothers who are "priest or deacon or of any other clerical order". If the trend reported by Marsiglio continued, the ratio of clerical to lay brethren may have increased in the late Middle Ages. Pierre Hélyot, having seen certain tomb effigies of some brethren bearing the insignia of ordination, calls the Order the Chanoines Hospitaliers de S. Jacques du Haut-Pas ou de Lucques (canons hospitaller of Saint James of Altopascio or of Lucca).

The knights (cavalieri) of the Order were established by chapter 93 of its Rule, which is an almost verbatim copy of a paragraph of a set of Hospitaller regulations drawn up at Margat in 1204–06. The knights are only mentioned once else in the Rule, in chapter 78, where the process of electing a grand master is described. The prior of the Order is to select from the brethren a priest (frate preite), a knight, and a servitor (also sergent, servente), who will form the electorate and choose a master. Emerton casts doubt on the military nature of these knights, suggesting instead that they were lay noble religious. He points out that the Rule omits all of the Hospitallers' references to horses, arms, and armour.

Besides the priest and knight there is another special position in the order, singled out for its involvement in the election of the master: the servitor, who was subordinate to the regular brother. The servitors were not allowed to fighting among themselves, to refuse work, or to spend the night in town without permission. Strict penalties were prescribed, but their pay was never withheld and they appear to have been hired workers. They were under the direction of the brethren, but performed the majority of menial tasks.

=== Symbols ===
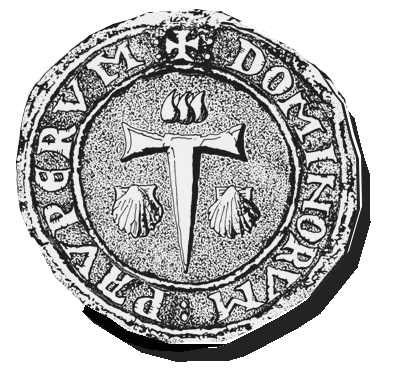
An engraving of the seal of the Order, showing its "tau" symbol. Di nero alla Tau d'argento, con il braccio verticale aguzzato e affiancata da due conchiglie di San Giacomo dello stesso ("Black, with a silver tau, with a sharpened vertical arm and flanked by two conchs of Saint James, the same").

The symbol of the order was the letter tau, usually white on a black field, the vertical arm of the tau being always pointed at the bottom and the crossbar either square at the ends or else concave or notched like a Maltese cross, the result being called a croce taumata. These peculiarities have suggested to some historians that it represents an auger and an axe or hammer and thus carpentry, probably to be associated with bridge-building and road maintenance. The aforementioned edict of Frederick II contains one obligation placed on the order:

It is our will and command that the hospice and its brethren build and maintain upon the public pilgrim's highway near Ficeclum on the White Arno, at the most convenient point, a bridge for the service of travellers, and this without let or hindrance from any person whomsoever. But if, in case of flood or other accident, they shall be without a bridge, it is our will that they provide a ferry-boat for the free transportation of pilgrims, and it shall be unlawful for any other person to keep any boat there for passengers, whether for hire or not.

Cross (Tau) of the Order of Saint James of Altopascio

The Order's rule, however, does not mention the maintenance of bridges or roads. A similar tau-like symbol or cross was venerated at the same time by the Franciscans. It may have symbolised perfection, since taf was the last letter of the Hebrew alphabet.

== Activities ==
The care of the sick was the primary mission of the Order. The Rule required four physicians and two surgeons attached to the hospital. The Rule exhibits "an enlightened conception of the needs of the sick that would do credit to any modern institution". It laid down the principle of primum non nocere and even advised a "hearty diet" during Lent for the ill. For "our lords (domini, signori) the sick", as the Order's patients are called in the Rule, beds must be large with separate sheets and coverlets, each patient was to have fur cloak and woolen cap for use in the commons area (per andare ad luogo commune). Cribs and cradles were to be provided for newborns.

The Order was not an order of fratres pontifices ("pontifical, i.e. bridge-building, brethren") and was not heavily involved in bridge-building. Hélyot, in examining the origins of certain bridges associated with hospitallers in the Rhône valley, ascribed their construction to the Order of Altopascio, whose members he calls religieux hospitaliers pontifes ("bridge-building hospitaller religious"). Hélyot went so far as to associated the famous Saint Bénézet with the Altopascians. Henri Grégoire, writing in 1818, cast doubt on the thesis and Emerton rejected it as groundless while admitting that the Provençal hospitals may well have been associated with Altopascia. Besides the bridge at Fucechhio which is known from the imperial edict of 1244 to have been charged to the Order's care, other bridges may have been maintained in Italy where the Via Francigena crosses the Arda, the Elsa, the Taro, and the Usciana.

== Primary texts ==
=== Text of the Papal bull of 1239 ===
Ephraim Emerton provides an English translation of the Papal bull granting the Order a rule:

Gregory, Bishop, Servant of the Servants of God, to the Master and Brethren of the Hospital of Altopascio in the Diocese of Lucca, Greeting and Apostolic Benediction!
It is the practice of the apostolic see to respond favorably to pious requests and to grant its kindly favor to the sincere prayers of its petitioners. Wherefore, beloved sons in the Lord, we have inclined our ear to your petition and have decided to grant to you and to your successors by these presents the Rule of the Brethren of the Hospital of Saint John of Jerusalem, to be observed forever in the Hospital of Altopassus and in all its dependent houses, the privileges previously granted by the apostolic see to your hospital to remain in full force.
We do not intend, however, that through this grant the Master and Brethren of the Hospital of Jerusalem shall acquire any rights or jurisdiction whatsoever over your hospital or its [subsidiary] houses. Let no one, therefore, encroach upon this our grant or act in rash opposition to it. If any one shall presume to attempt this, let him know that he will incur the wrath of Almighty God and his blessed Apostles, Peter and Paul.

Given at the Lateran on the 5th day of April in the 13th year of our pontificate.

=== Selection of chapters from the Rule, 1239 ===
Emerton provides an English translation of chapter 20 of the Altopascian rule, concerning punishment for the holding of private property:

If any brother at the time of his death shall have any property which he has concealed from the Master, he shall be buried without divine service as a person excommunicate. And if during his life concealed money shall be found upon him, it shall be hanged about his neck and he shall be stripped and soundly flogged through the Hospital of Saint James at Altopascio or any other house where he may belong, by a clergyman, if he be a clergyman, and by a layman, if he be a layman. And let him do penance for forty days and fast the fourth and sixth days of the week on bread and water.

He also provides a translation those chapters (30–37) concerning the death and burial of members:

Where the body of a brother of the Hospital shall be buried, there let his name be written in the calendar, and after thirty days let there be an anniversary day for him forever. If in the church where the trecennario [memorial service of thirty days] is celebrated there are three priests, let one celebrate the trecennario and the two others sing the masses for the day. If there are two priests, the service of the trecennario is to be divided between them, and the fees also. In a church where there is only one priest another is to be called in from outside to perform the trecennario, and when this is completed he is to receive as a gratuity (caritatevilemente [sic]), one bezant and a shirt and a new pair of breeches, according to the custom of the House. But, if no [outside] priest can be found, the priest of the House alone may perform the trecennario, celebrating mass daily for the dead, excepting on Sundays and holy days, and then let a special commemoration for the dead brother be made; but, after thirty days, let the number of thirty days on which only special masses are said for the dead brother be completed, and then let the priest have the aforesaid gratuity.

He also provides a translation of chapter 45, about the care of the sick:

Finally, besides the daily care and watchfulness which the brethren of the Hospital are bound to exercise with zeal and devotion toward the needy poor, as toward their masters, it is added in Chapter General that in each corridor (rutga), i.e., ward (piazza) of the house of the Hospital, where the patients lie, nine servitors shall be placed at their service, who, under the orders of the brethren, shall bathe the heads and feet of the sick and dry them with towels. They shall keep them tidy (forbano), shall make their beds, bring them their meals, and supply them carefully with drink, and, in general, whatever is needful and useful for the sick they shall obediently do.

He also provides a translation of chapter 64, based on Hospitaller esgard 10, which concerns crimes by members:

If any brother, being priest or deacon or of any other clerical order, shall commit any offense, and this shall come to the knowledge of the Prior or the Master, the brethren whom the Prior shall select for the court shall judge with righteous judgment and shall impose a penance of seven days or even of forty according to the gravity of the fault, just as in the case of other brethren who are not in holy orders. For, seeing that we are all of one religion and all, both clergy and laymen, make the same profession, it seems unfitting that there should be any distinction between brethren within the Hospital. Wherefore it is ordered that, as we live under one rule, so also we ought to be subject to the same judges of the rule.

He also provides a translation of chapters 67–70 and 72 on the relationship between friars (fratres) and servitors:

If a friar shall strike a servitor, and this shall come to the knowledge of the Prior of the House, let him do penance for seven days. If blood flows, except from the nose, let him do penance for forty days; but, if the servitor dies from the wound, the friar shall lose his habit and shall be sent to Rome to our lord the pope for his penance. After that, if he receive letters from the pope and ask for mercy, he may be received back, saving the justice of the house, and shall do penance for forty days.
If a servitor assaults a friar, and the friar reports it to the Prior, let the servitor do penance. But, if he shall call the friar a thief or a fornicator or a malefactor under the house rules (della casa), and cannot prove the charge, let him be severely flogged by the friars, first through the house, then to the door, and out of the house; nevertheless, let him be paid what is owing to him.
In the case of a servitor who quits without permission and then returns to make amends, if his service is paid at the discretion of the Hospital (ad caritate), first let him do penance and, for the time since the beginning of the year, let nothing be reckoned to him. But if he is serving on contract (ad convenzione), after he has done his penance, let the time of his actual service be reckoned to him, and at the end of the year, let him be paid his price, that is, what is due him.
If a servitor steals property of the Hospital, even a whole loaf of bread, or shall sell the same, and it be clearly proven, let the stolen property be hanged about his neck, and let him be soundly flogged through the house to the door, and at the door let him be given a loaf of bread and be discharged, and let him have what he has earned—but, this at the discretion of the Prior and the friars.
Servitors may not testify against a friar except on a charge involving penance of seven days. If they have the presumption to attempt this on a charge of forty days' penance, they shall not be heard. If they try to testify to a crime for which a friar would lose his habit, they shall not be believed—unless he be caught in the act—which God forbid!

He also provides a translation of chapter 93, the only one concerned with knighthoods:

Let no one demand to be made a knight while he is in the Hospital, unless this had been promised him before he took the habit of a religious, and then only if he has reached the age at which he might have become a knight if he had remained in the world. Nevertheless the sons of noblemen, especially if they have been brought up in the Hospital, when they have reached military age, may, with the consent of the Master and[/or] of the Prior (coinandeor, comandatore), and with the approval of the brethren of the House, be invested with the insignia of knighthood.

=== An incident at Pescia in 1358 ===
Emerton also provides an English translation of Giovanni Lami's retelling of an incident involving the Order and the city of Pescia in 1358:

At that time the Grand Master was Messer Jacopo da Pescia. He accepted as brethren of the Order many citizens of Pescia who were married men and who took the habit to escape the payment of taxes and avoid doing guard duty, to the very great detriment of the community. When the commune perceived that the greed (ingordigia) of these friars was over great it deputed a magistrate to see that the commune was protected and to take such action as was best for the service of God and of the public. This magistrate, having heard and well considered what these friars had been doing, gave orders that they should be driven out of Pescia and its territory and should not be allowed to enter it. He made proclamation that whoever had any claim against the Master and his friars should bring it before the chancellor of the community, and that no person should work the properties of the friars or cause them to be worked, under heavy penalties. He sent messengers to the [papal] legate, to the Signoria of Florence and to Messer Andrea da Todi, the papal collector, to notify them of his action. The result of this policy of the commune was that the Master and the friars refrained from taking married men as brethren, but when an occasion arose for receiving such the Master wrote to the commune commending himself, the friars, and the hospitals to the protection of the same. This letter was read in the Grand Council and referred by it to the above-mentioned magistrate for the necessary action. After due consideration of the whole matter he decided that certain married men of Pescia were not and could not be brethren of that Order, but were subject to the jurisdiction of the commune of Pescia. Messer Andrea da Todi, the papal collector, also gave orders that the Master should not in future receive any married person, and that those friars who were married should have no vote in the chapter.

== Secondary sources ==
=== Further reading ===
- Archivio Storico Italiano, ser. IV, vol. XVI (1885), I26.

Contains a record of Altopascian documents at Lucca.

- Léon LeGrand, "Les Maisons-Dieu, leur Statuts au XIII^{e} Siècle", Revue des Questions Historiques (July 1896).

Contains a note analysing and summarising the elements of the Altopascian rule.

- Pietro Fanfani, Regola dei frati di S. Jacopo d'Altopascio (Bologna: Press Gaetano Romagnoli, 1864).

An Italian translation of the Order's rule.

- Nikolaus Paulus, Indulgences as a Social Factor in the Middle Ages, trans. J. Elliot Ross (The Minerva Group, 2001 [1923]).

Contains a long chapter on bridge-building which deal extensively with Order of Altopascio.

- Duane J. Osheim (1983), "Conversion, Conversi, and the Christian Life in Late Medieval Tuscany," Speculum, 58:2, 368–90.

Description of converts to the religious life, with much citing of Altopascian documents.
