= Hôpital Cochin =

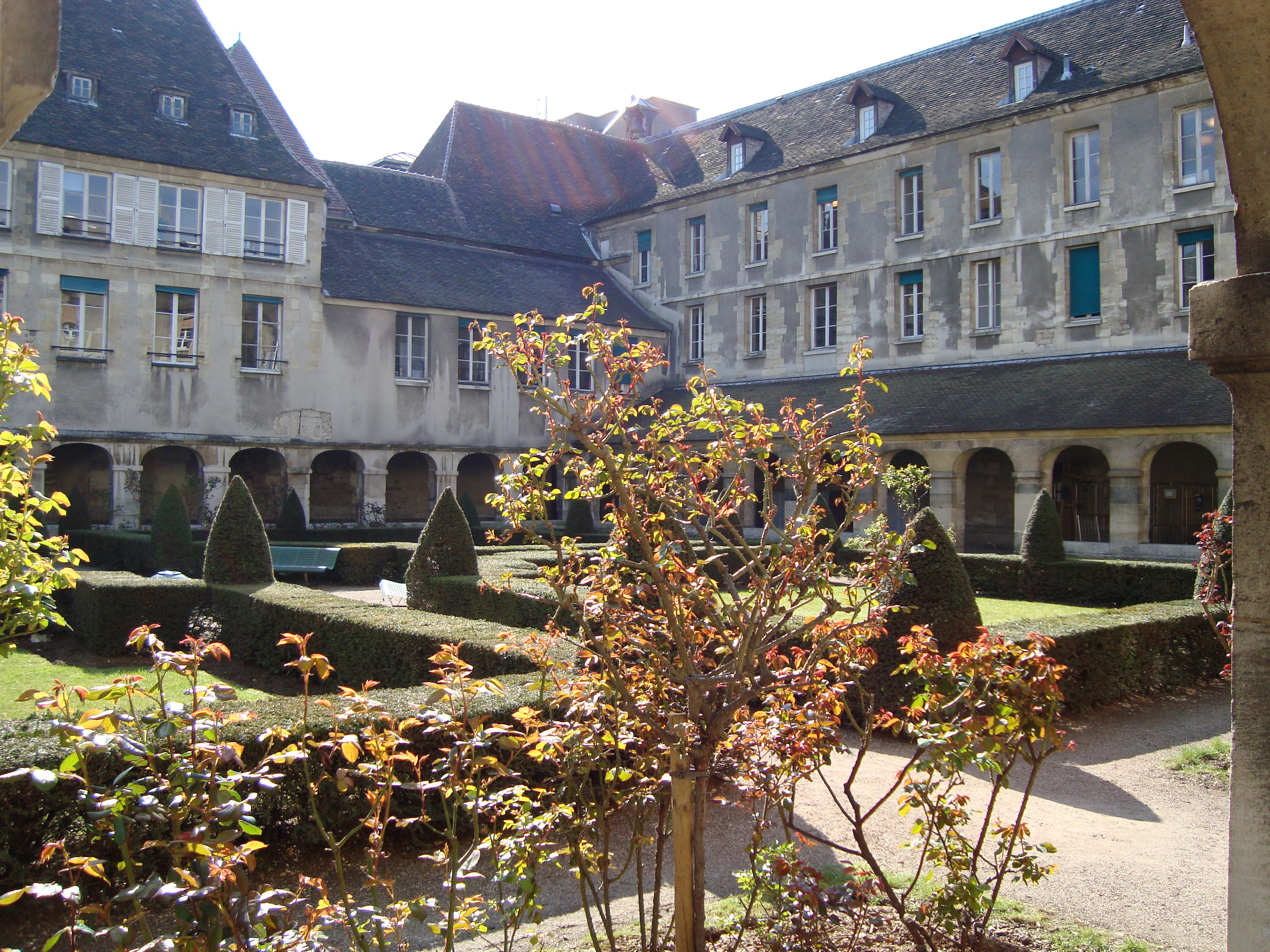
- Cloître de Port-Royal, Hôpital Cochin, a remnant of the former Abbey of Port-Royal

Geography
- Location: rue du Faubourg-Saint-Jacques, Paris, France
- Coordinates: 48°50′13″N 2°20′25″E

Organisation
- Type: General

Links
- Website: hopital-cochin-port-royal.aphp.fr
- Lists: Hospitals in France

The Hôpital Cochin (French pronunciation: [opital kɔʃɛ̃]) is a public hospital situated on Rue du Faubourg-Saint-Jacques, Paris 14e. It houses the main burn treatment centre of the city. The Hôpital Cochin is an affiliate of the Faculté de Médecine Paris-Cité. It is named after Jean-Denis Cochin, curé of the parish of Saint-Jacques-du-Haut-Pas, who founded a hospital for the workers and poor of this quarter of Paris.

Since 1990, a biomedical research centre, the Institut Cochin, has been affiliated with the hospital. It was reorganised in 2002 to encompass genetic research, molecular biology and cellular biology, with a staff of about 600. It is part of both INSERM and CNRS, integrated into the Université Paris Cité.

In 2004, the Maison de Solenn, a shelter for adolescents named after Solenn Poivre d'Arvor, has opened in the hospital with the active support of Bernadette Chirac.

== History ==
Early in the morning of 30 May 1832, the mathematician Évariste Galois was shot in the abdomen during a duel at the age of 20 and died the following morning at ten o'clock in the Cochin hospital, probably of peritonitis, after refusing the offices of a priest. He was buried in a common grave in the Montparnasse Cemetery nearby.

George Orwell also had a stay at the hospital for a bout of "La Grippe" in March 1929. He describes it in his story "How the Poor Die".
