= Jean-Denis Cochin =

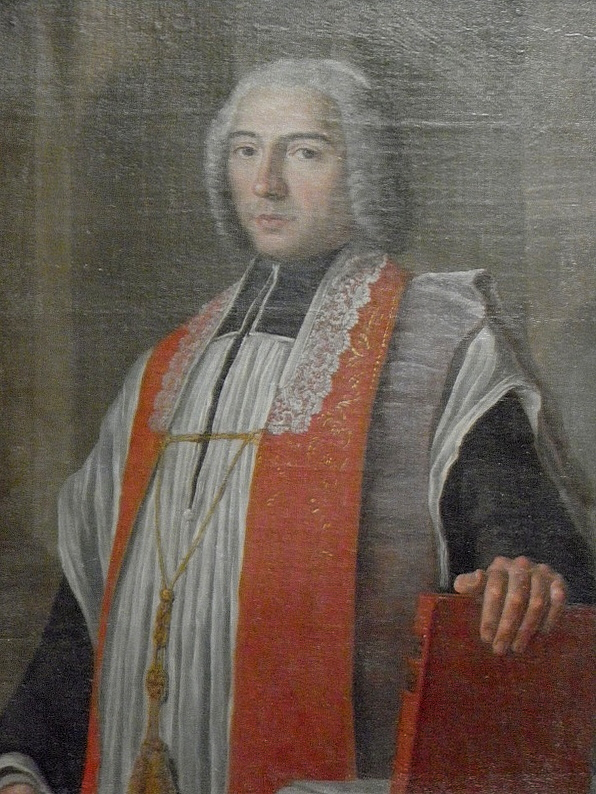
- Portrait of Cochin in the Église Saint-Jacques-du-Haut-Pas
- Born: 1 January 1726; Paris
- Died: 3 June 1783 (aged 57); Paris
- Occupation: Priest
- Known for: Founder of the Hôpital Cochin

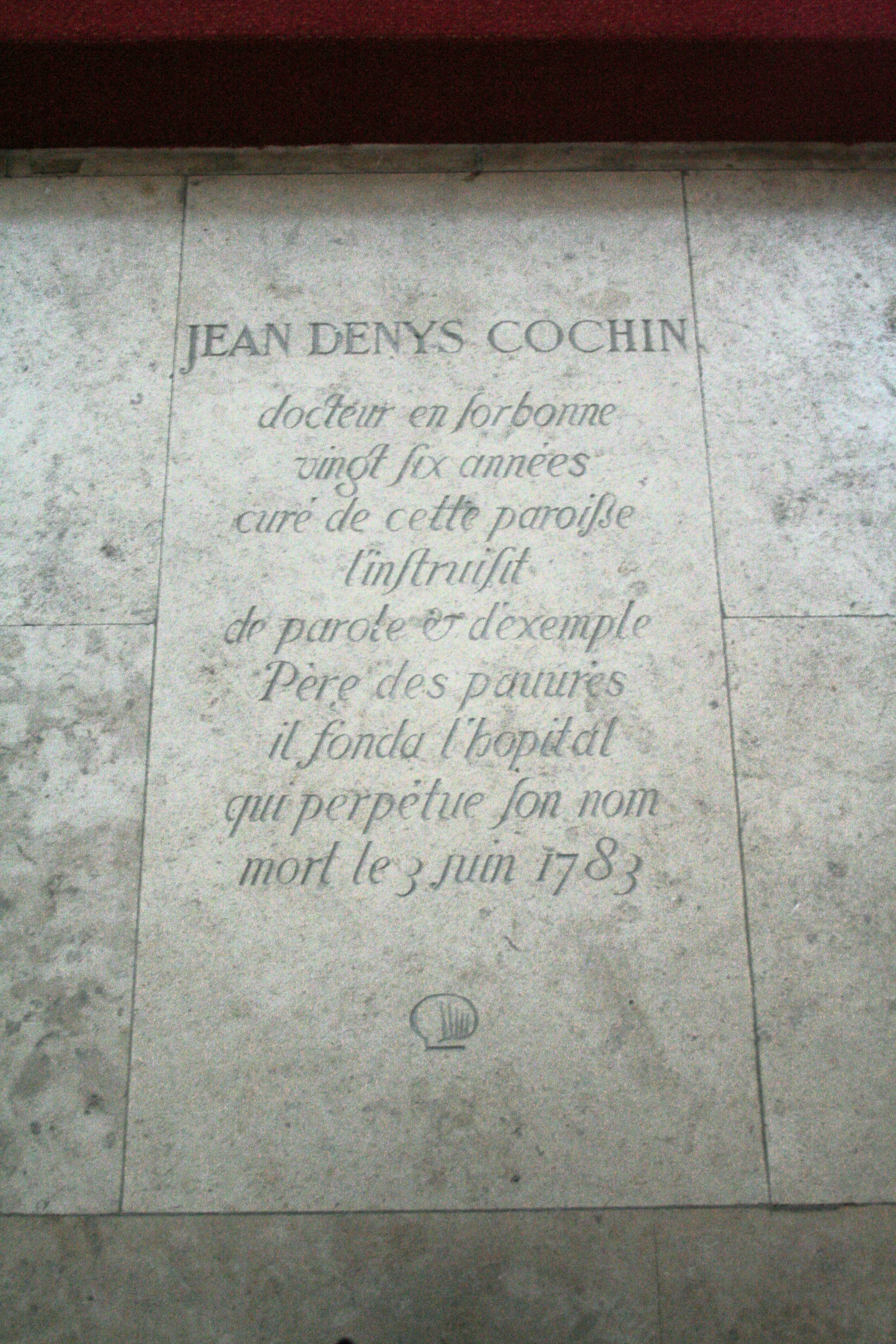
Stone commemorating Jean-Denis Cochin in the church of Saint-Jacques-du-Haut-Pas

Jean-Denis Cochin (French pronunciation: [ʒɑ̃ dəni kɔʃɛ̃]; 1 January 1726, in Paris – 3 June 1783, in Paris) was a French Roman Catholic priest, preacher and philanthropist. In 1780, he founded Paris's Hôpital Cochin, as the hospice of Saint-Jacques du Haut Pas, in the rue du Faubourg Saint-Jacques.

== Life ==
His father, Claude-Denis Cochin (died 1786), was well known as a botanist. Jean-Denis followed a course of theological studies in the Sorbonne and graduated with the degree of Doctor. In 1755 he was ordained priest.

The next year he became the parish priest of Saint-Jacques-du-Haut-Pas. There, he spent his whole life working for the material and spiritual betterment of his parishioners; he was particularly well known for his preaching.

Cochin is especially remembered for his philanthropy and for founding a hospital that continues to operate to this day. The idea of creating an institution to serve the healthcare needs of his parishioners was conceived in 1780 and resulted in the completion of a building over which the Sisters of Charity took charge. The inscription on the building read: Pauper clamavit et Dominus exaudivit eum (The poor man cried, and the Lord heard him). He devoted his entire fortune to the project. The hospital was inaugurated with 38 beds. It was originally called Hôpital Saint-Jacques.

In 1801, the General Council of the Paris hospitals gave it its name of its charitable founder, which it retained. Today, Cochin hospital is a large institution and is part of the system of university hospitals in Paris.

== Works ==
Cochin’s published works include:

- Four books of Sunday sermons (Paris, 1786–1808);
- "Exhortations on the Feasts, Fasts and Ceremonies of the Church" (Paris, 1778);
- "Retreat Exercises" (Paris, 1778);
- "Spiritual Writings", a posthumous work published by his brother (Paris, 1784).
