= 2004 Burgundy regional election =

← 1998	21 March 2004 (first round); 28 March 2004 (second round)	2010 →
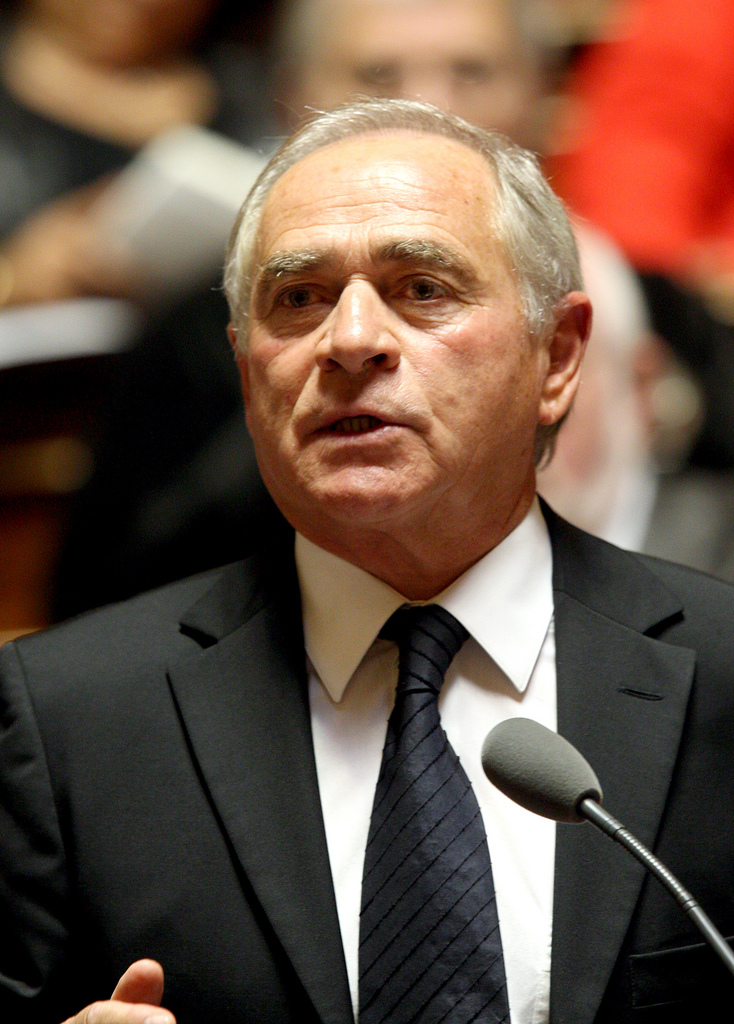

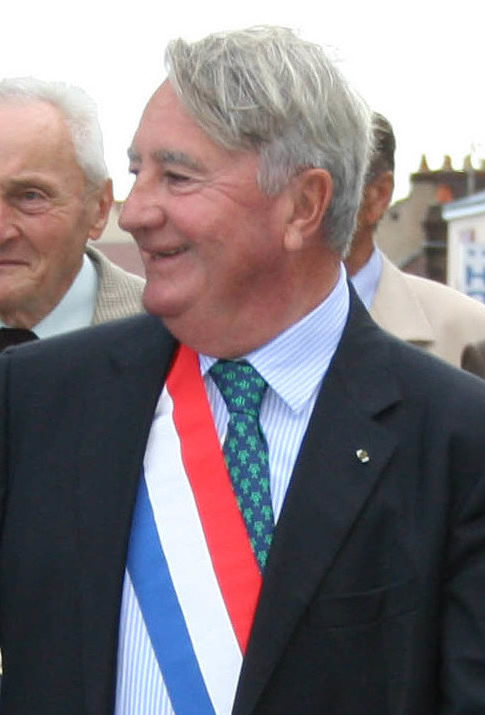
	First party	Second party	Third party
Leader	François Patriat	Jean-Pierre Soisson	Pierre Jaboulet-Vercherre
Party	PS	UMP	FN
Seats won	37	14	6
Popular vote	369,288	226,148	108,133
Percentage	52.49%	32.14%	15.37%

A regional election took place in Burgundy on 21 March and 28 March 2004, along with all other regions. François Patriat (PS) was re-elected President of the Council.

== Results ==
Party	Candidate	First round		Second round		Seats
Party	Candidate	Votes	%	Votes	%	Seats
PS–PCF–PRG–Verts	François Patriat	240,445	35.90	369,288	52.49	37
UMP–MDR	Jean-Pierre Soisson (incumbent)	145,428	21.71	226,148	32.14	14
National Front	Pierre Jaboulet-Vercherre	105,270	15.72	108,133	15.37	6
Union for French Democracy	François Sauvadet	88,674	13.24			0
Independent Ecological Movement	Julien Gonzalez	34,810	5.20			0
LCR/LO	Jacqueline Lambert	26,191	3.91			0
Citizen and Republican Movement	Joël Mekhantar	17,213	2.57			0
National Republican Movement	Claude Moreau	11,701	1.75			0
Total		669,732	100.00	703,569	100.00	57
Valid votes		669,732	94.74	703,569	94.67	
Invalid/blank votes		37,164	5.26	39,623	5.33	
Total votes		706,896	100.00	743,192	100.00	
Registered voters/turnout		1,136,336	62.21	1,136,031	65.42	
Source: Ministry of the Interior, Delwit
