= René Lioret =

French politician (born 1952)

Member of the French National Assembly for Côte-d'Or's 5th constituency
- Incumbent
- Assumed office 18 July 2024
- Preceded by: Didier Paris

Personal details
- Born: 13 January 1952 (age 73) Chagny, Saône-et-Loire, France
- Political party: National Rally

René Lioret (born 13 January, 1952) is a French politician of the National Rally who was elected as a deputy for Côte-d'Or's 5th constituency during the 2024 French legislative election.

== Biography ==
Lioret was born in January 1952 in Chagny. He began his professional career working for Lederle Laboratories in 1976 as a specialist in psychotropic drugs before joining the French pharmaceutical company Urgo in 1984 as an operations director. He retired in 2018.

He first joined the National Rally (at the time called the National Front) in the 1980s after moving to Côte-d'Or. He was a candidate in several national and local elections in the 1990s without being elected. In 2021, he was finally elected in the regional elections and became a member of the Bourgogne-Franche-Comté regional council on Julien Odoul's list. In 2024, Lioret made headlines when he raised a banner reading Foreign Rapists Out with the other regional councillors of the RN group during a council session. Lioret first contested Côte-d'Or's 5th constituency during the 2017 French legislative election and was eliminated on the first round before finishing second in 2022. He narrowly won the seat from Didier Paris in 2024. During the election, Lioret stated he would not campaign to remove foreign seasonal employees working for winegrowers the region due to their importance for the local economy.

Lioret has been noted by the media to make controversial statements on social media, including a post on Twitter, including referring to a group who filmed an attack on a disabled student at a school in Saint-Maximin in 2022 as "African scum" and calling La France Insoumise deputy Louis Boyard an "asshole" and a "shit bag" on Twitter after Boyard's admission to selling drugs in the past.
