= Guillaume Larrivé =

French politician (born 1977)

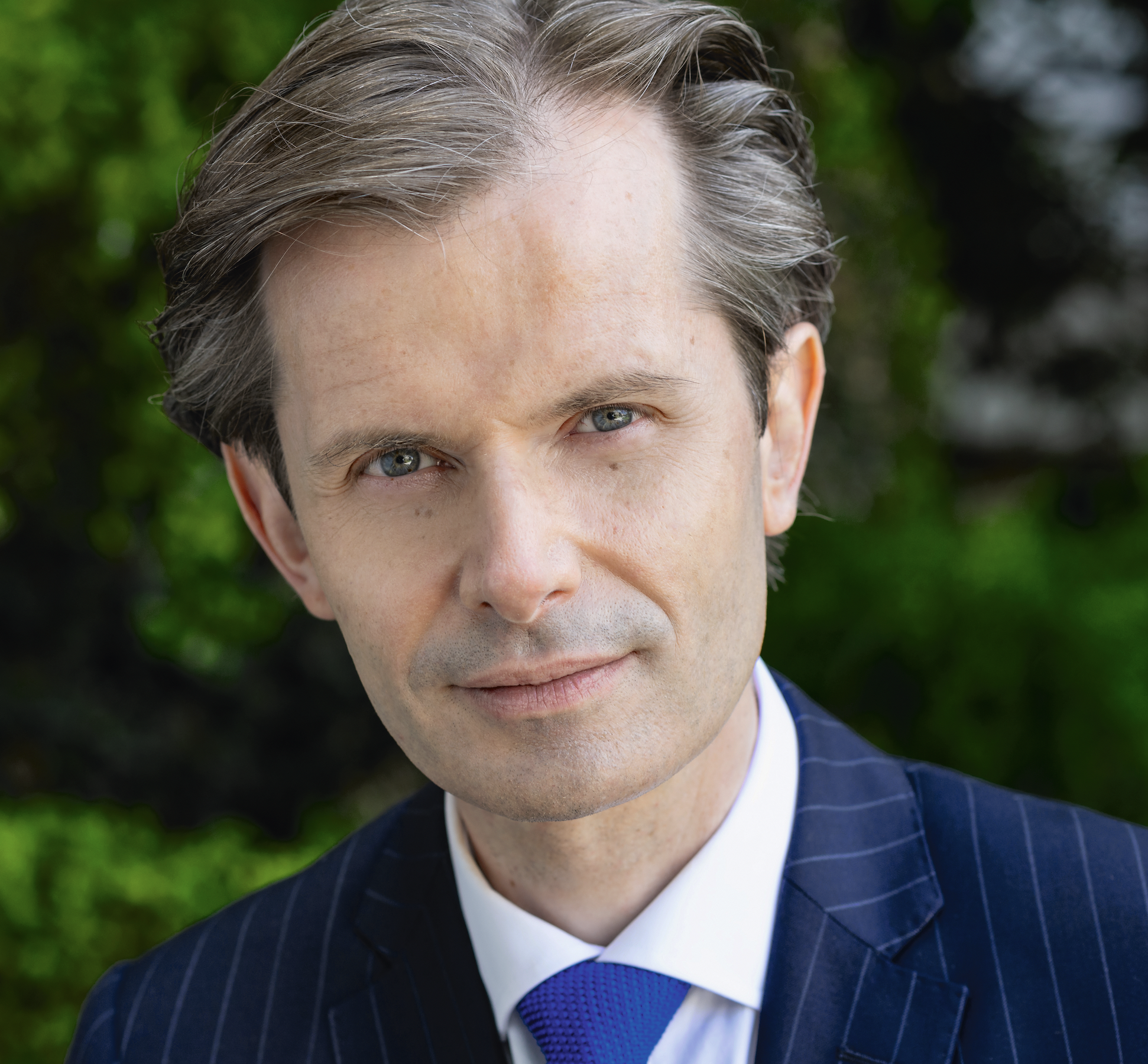

Member of the National Assembly for Yonne's 1st constituency
- In office 20 June 2012 – 21 June 2022
- Preceded by: Jean-Pierre Soisson
- Succeeded by: Daniel Grenon

Member of the Regional Council of Burgundy
- In office 26 March 2010 – 19 June 2012

Personal details
- Born: 24 January 1977 (age 49) Mulhouse, France
- Party: Union for a Popular Movement (until 2015); The Republicans (2015–present)
- Education: ESSEC Business School; Sciences Po; École nationale d'administration
- Occupation: Politician, lawyer, civil servant

Guillaume Larrivé (French pronunciation: [ɡijom laʁive]; born 24 January 1977) is a French politician, lawyer and civil servant who represented the 1st constituency of the Yonne department in the National Assembly from 2012 to 2022. He is a member of The Republicans (LR). Since 2023, he has been a Councillor of State.

== Education ==
A native of Mulhouse, Larrivé studied at Sciences Po, ESSEC Business School and École nationale d'administration.

== Career ==
Larrivé began his career as a member of the Council of State in 2002. He served in government as a law adviser to the Interior Minister Nicolas Sarkozy (2005–2007), deputy head of cabinet to the Immigration Minister (2007–2009), Labour Minister (2009) and Interior Minister (2009–2011) Brice Hortefeux and Counsellor to the President, Nicolas Sarkozy (2011–2012).

Larrivé also served as a member of the Regional Council of Burgundy from 2010 to 2012. After Sarkozy's defeat in the presidential election of 2012, Larrivé was elected to the National Assembly. He was re-elected in 2017. He was a candidate in the 2019 Republican leadership election.

He lost his seat in the first round of the 2022 French legislative election.

== Political positions ==
Ahead of the 2022 presidential election, Larrivé publicly declared his support for Valérie Pécresse as The Republicans' candidate.
