= François Patriat =

French politician (1943–2026)

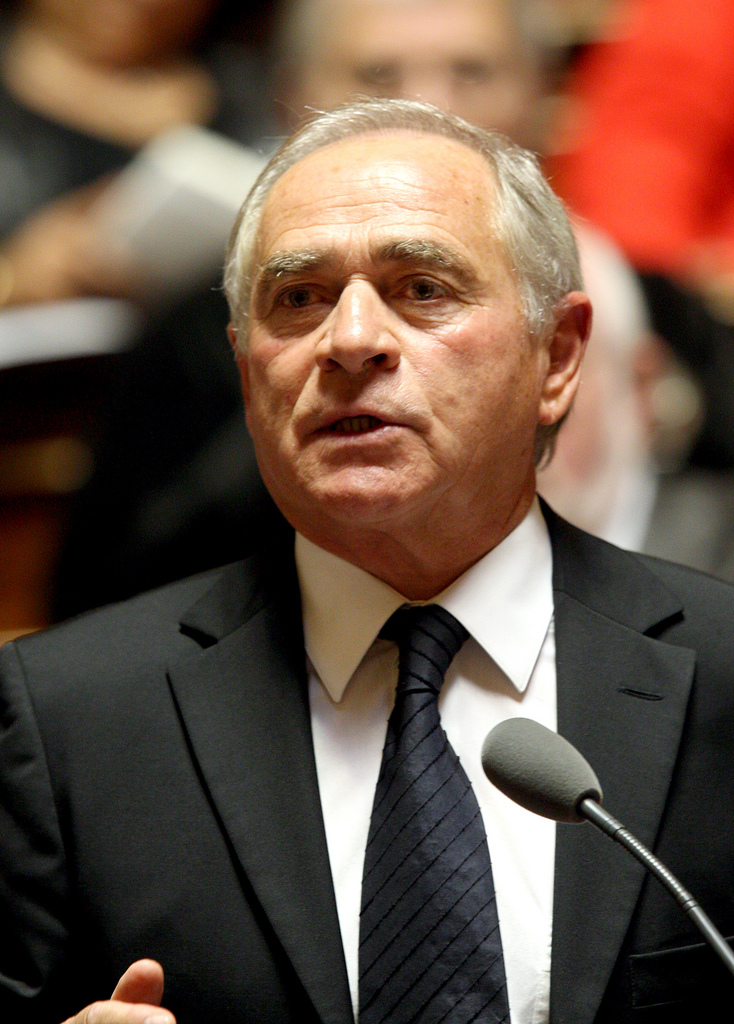
- Patriat in 2008

President of the Rally of Democrats, Progressive and Independent group in the Senate
- In office 27 June 2017 – 19 August 2026
- Preceded by: Position established
- Succeeded by: Xavier Iacovelli

French Senator from Côte-d'Or
- In office 1 October 2008 – 19 August 2026

President of the Regional Council of Burgundy
- In office 2 April 2004 – 31 December 2015
- Preceded by: Jean-Pierre Soisson
- Succeeded by: Marie-Guite Dufay (Bourgogne-Franche-Comté)

Minister of Agriculture and Fisheries
- In office 25 February 2002 – 6 May 2002
- Prime Minister: Lionel Jospin
- Preceded by: Jean Glavany
- Succeeded by: Hervé Gaymard

Secretary of State for Small and medium-sized businesses, Trade and Crafts
- In office 18 October 2000 – 25 February 2002
- Prime Minister: Lionel Jospin
- Preceded by: Marylise Lebranchu
- Succeeded by: Christian Pierret

Mayor of Chailly-sur-Armançon
- In office 17 March 1989 – 11 March 2001
- Succeeded by: André Loizon

Member of the National Assembly for Côte-d'Or
- In office 12 June 1997 – 18 November 2000
- Preceded by: Alain Suguenot
- Succeeded by: Jean-Claude Robert
- Constituency: 5th
- In office 2 July 1981 – 1 April 1993
- Preceded by: Jean-Philippe Lecat
- Succeeded by: Alain Suguenot
- Constituency: 3rd (1981–1986); At-large (1986–1988); 5th (1988–1993)

Personal details
- Born: 21 March 1943 Semur-en-Auxois, German-occupied France
- Died: 19 August 2026 (aged 83) Dijon, France
- Party: Renaissance (2017–2026)
- Other political affiliations: Socialist Party (1974–2017)
- Education: École nationale vétérinaire d'Alfort

François Patriat (French pronunciation: [fʁɑ̃swa patʁija]; 21 March 1943 – 19 August 2026) was a French politician of Renaissance (RE, formerly LREM) who served as president of the party's group in the Senate from 2017 until his death in 2026. He represented the Côte-d'Or department in the Senate from 2008 to 2026. Patriat also served as Minister of Agriculture and Fisheries in 2002 and President of the Regional Council of Burgundy from 2004 until 2015. He was a member of the Socialist Party before joining La République En Marche! in 2017.

== Early life and education ==
Born in Semur-en-Auxois, Côte-d'Or, Patriat graduated from École nationale vétérinaire d'Alfort (ENVA) in 1968.

== Political career ==
=== Early beginnings ===
Patriat joined the Socialist Party (PS) in 1974 and was elected to the General Council of Côte-d'Or for the canton of Pouilly-en-Auxois in 1976, a position he retained until 2008. In 1981, he was elected to the National Assembly. In 1989, Patriat became Mayor of Chailly-sur-Armançon, an office he held until 2001.

=== Ministership under Prime Minister Jospin ===
In 2000, Patriat was appointed Secretary of State in charge of small and medium-sized businesses, trade and crafts at the Ministry of the Economy, Finance and Industry under minister Laurent Fabius in the government of Prime Minister Lionel Jospin. In 2002, he was appointed Minister of Agriculture and Fisheries. He left office when Jean-Pierre Raffarin became prime minister.

=== Regional Council of Burgundy ===
In the 2004 regional elections, Patriat led a list that defeated the list conducted by incumbent Regional Council President Jean-Pierre Soisson. Reelected in 2010, he left the position in 2015, before the region was merged with Franche-Comté.

Ahead of the 2012 French presidential election, Patriat publicly endorsed Dominique Strauss-Kahn as the Socialist Party's candidate.

=== Member of the Senate, 2008–2026 ===
Patriat was elected to the Senate in 2008. Reelected in 2014, he joined La République En Marche! (REM) in 2017. After supporting Emmanuel Macron's successful candidacy for the presidency of the French Republic in the 2017 presidential election and rallying enough of his fellow senators to form a group affiliated with REM in the Senate, he became the new group's president.

From November 2017, Patriat was part of LREM's executive board under the leadership of the party's successive chairmen Christophe Castaner and Stanislas Guerini.

== Death ==
Patriat was seriously injured during a collision whilst cycling on 17 July 2026. He succumbed to his injuries in a hospital in Dijon on 19 August, at the age of 83.

Political offices
Preceded by Jean Glavany	Minister of Agriculture and Fisheries; 2002	Succeeded by Hervé Gaymard
