= Yonne's 1st constituency =

Constituency of the National Assembly of France

1st constituency of Yonne
- inline Constituency of the National Assembly of France

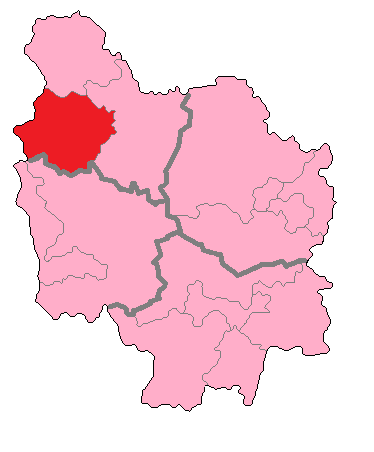
- Yonne's 1st Constituency shown within Burgundy
- Deputy: Daniel Grenon; RN
- Department: Yonne
- Cantons: Aillant-sur-Tholon, Auxerre-Est, Auxerre-Nord, Auxerre-Nord-Ouest, Auxerre-Sud, Auxerre-Sud-Ouest, Bléneau, Charny, Coulanges-la-Vineuse, Courson-les-Carrières, Saint-Fargeau, Saint-Sauveur-en-Puisaye, Toucy, (part) Seignelay (Part)
- Registered voters: 78,334

The 1st constituency of the Yonne is a French legislative constituency in the Yonne département.

== Description ==
Yonne's 1st Constituency covers the south west of the department and includes its prefecture Auxerre.

Since 1988, the constituency has never returned left-of-centre candidates to the Assembly.

Between 1981 and 2012, the deputy was Jean-Pierre Soisson. Soisson was mayor of Auxerre between 1971 and 1998. He became a minister between 1988 and 1993, as part of president Mitterrand ouverture efforts, to include centre-right politicians in his left-wing governments.

In 2012, Soisson retired and the election was a close call between Guy Férez, the socialist mayor of Auxerre, and Guillaume Larrivé, an advisor to various ministers and the president Nicolas Sarkozy between 2005 and 2012. Larrivé was reelected in 2017 against Paulo Da Silva Moreira, the candidate from La République en marche, president Emmanuel Macron's party.

In 2022, Larrivé is eliminated in the first round of the election and the second round is decided between Florence Loury, a green candidate supported by the left-wing NUPES alliance, and Daniel Grenon, the far-right National Rally candidate. The latter is elected by a slim margin of 729 votes.

== Historic representation ==
Election	Member	Party
1988	Jean-Pierre Soisson	UDF
1993	Jean-Pierre Soisson	MDR
1997	Jean-Pierre Soisson	DL
2002	Jean-Pierre Soisson	UMP
2007	Jean-Pierre Soisson	UMP
2012	Guillaume Larrivé	UMP
2017	Guillaume Larrivé	LR
2022	Daniel Grenon	RN
2024	Daniel Grenon	RN

== Election results ==
=== 2024 ===
-->

Legislative Election 2024: Yonne's 1st constituency
Party	Candidate	Votes	%	±%
LR	Céline Bähr	7,303	14.40	−8.21
LÉ–EELV (NFP)	Florence Loury	12,851	25.34	+1.09
LO	Sylvie Manigaut	654	1.29	n/a
RN	Daniel Grenon	20,486	40.40	+16.48
REC	Jean-Christophe Letierce	542	1.07	−3.69
RE (Ensemble)	Victor Albrecht	8,871	17.49	−2.01
Turnout		50,707	97.52	+45.66
Registered electors		74,973		
2nd round result
RN	Daniel Grenon	23,737	51.38	+0.27
LÉ–EELV	Florence Loury	22,459	48.62	−0.27
Turnout		46,196	89.57	+39.77
Registered electors		74,976		
RN hold				

=== 2022 ===
Legislative Election 2022: Yonne's 1st constituency
Party	Candidate	Votes	%	±%
EELV (NUPÉS)	Florence Loury	9,339	24.25	+7.47
RN	Daniel Grenon	9,214	23.92	+8.34
LR (UDC)	Guillaume Larrivé	8,709	22.61	−6.40
LREM (Ensemble)	Victor Albrecht	7,509	19.50	−14.26
REC	Paul Téqui	1,835	4.76	N/A
Others	N/A	1,908	-	−
Turnout		38,514	51.86	−0.04
2nd round result
RN	Daniel Grenon	16,865	51.11	N/A
EELV (NUPÉS)	Florence Loury	16,135	48.89	N/A
Turnout		33,000	49.80	+4.71
RN gain from LR				

=== 2017 ===
Legislative Election 2017: Yonne's 1st constituency
Party	Candidate	Votes	%	±%
LREM	Paulo Da Silva Moreira	13,482	33.76	
LR	Guillaume Larrivé	11,587	29.01	
FN	Ludovic Vigreux	6,221	15.58	
LFI	Mathieu Deburghrave	4,248	10.64	
EELV	Maud Navarre	2,453	6.14	
Others	N/A	1,946		
Turnout		39,937	51.90	
2nd round result
LR	Guillaume Larrivé	18,243	52.60	
LREM	Paulo Da Silva Moreira	16,442	47.40	
Turnout		34,685	45.09	
LR hold				

=== 2012 ===
Legislative Election 2012: Yonne's 1st constituency
Party	Candidate	Votes	%	±%
PS	Guy Ferez	16,631	35.75	
UMP	Guillaume Larrivé	16,015	34.43	
FN	Richard Jacob	7,809	16.79	
FG	Alain Raymont	2,385	5.13	
EELV	Maud Navarre	2,078	4.47	
Others	N/A	1,603		
Turnout		46,521	59.38	
2nd round result
UMP	Guillaume Larrivé	24,082	51.64	
PS	Guy Ferez	22,554	48.36	
Turnout		46,636	59.53	
UMP hold				

=== 2007 ===
Legislative Election 2007: Yonne's 1st constituency
Party	Candidate	Votes	%	±%
UMP	Jean-Pierre Soisson	18,430	39.45	
PS	Mireille Le Corre	10,256	21.95	
MoDem	Pascal Henriat	5,108	10.93	
DVD	Jean-Philippe Saulnier-Arrighi	3,659	7.83	
FN	Richard Jacob	2,649	5.67	
LV	Chantal Dhoukar	1,607	3.44	
PCF	Brigitte Picq-Debelle	1,526	3.27	
LCR	Michel Hournon	1,226	2.62	
Others	N/A	2,260		
Turnout		47,568	60.12	
2nd round result
UMP	Jean-Pierre Soisson	24,675	54.53	
PS	Mireille Le Corre	20,577	45.47	
Turnout		47,264	59.73	
UMP hold				

=== 2002 ===
Legislative Election 2002: Yonne's 1st constituency
Party	Candidate	Votes	%	±%
UMP	Jean-Pierre Soisson	21,131	43.96	
PS	Florence Parly	14,245	29.63	
FN	Nicole Aureau	6,847	14.24	
PR	Jean-Paul Rousseau	1,470	3.06	
CPNT	Ghislaine Gandon	1,358	2.82	
LCR	Pierre Laguillaumie	1,352	2.81	
Others	N/A	1,669		
Turnout		49,284	64.88	
2nd round result
UMP	Jean-Pierre Soisson	25,067	57.18	
PS	Florence Parly	18,772	42.82	
Turnout		46,023	60.59	
UMP hold				

=== 1997 ===
Legislative Election 1997: Yonne's 1st constituency
Party	Candidate	Votes	%	±%
MDR	Jean-Pierre Soisson	14,463	31.65	
PS	Guy Ferez	8,751	19.15	
FN	Marcelin Foissier	7,738	16.93	
PCF	Jean-Marc Langoureau	4,156	9.09	
DVD	Claude Dassie	2,455	5.37	
LV	Denis Martin	1,551	3.39	
LO	Alain Wolf	1,139	2.49	
MDC	Jean-Paul Rousseau	989	2.16	
Others	N/A	4,457		
Turnout		48,412	66.26	
2nd round result
MDR	Jean-Pierre Soisson	25,422	53.37	
PS	Guy Ferez	22,211	46.63	
Turnout		51,490	70.47	
MDR hold				

== Sources ==
Official results of French elections from 2002: "Résultats électoraux officiels en France" (in French).
