= Côte-d'Or's 5th constituency =

Constituency of the National Assembly of France

5th Constituency of the Côte-d'Or
- inline Constituency of the National Assembly of France

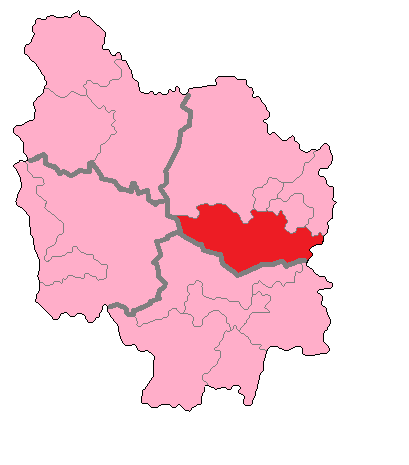
- Côte-d'Or's 5th Constituency shown within Burgundy
- Deputy: René Loiret; RN
- Department: Côte-d'Or
- Cantons: Arnay-le-Duc, Beaune-Nord, Beaune-Sud, Bligny-sur-Ouche, Gevrey-Chambertin, Liernais, Nolay, Nuits-Saint-Georges, Pouilly-en-Auxois, Saint-Jean-de-Losne, Seurre.
- Registered voters: 82,948

The 5th constituency of the Côte-d'Or is a French legislative constituency in the Côte-d'Or département. Like the other 576 French constituencies, it elects one MP using the two-round system.

== Description ==
Côte-d'Or's 5th constituency covers the southern section of the department with Beaune as its largest settlement.

Between 1988 and 2017, control of the seat swung between the Socialist Party and Gaullists, until centrist LREM won the seat in 2017.

== Historic Representation ==
Election	Member	Party
1986	Proportional representation – no election by constituency	
1988	François Patriat	PS
1993	Alain Suguenot	RPR
1997	François Patriat	PS
2002	Alain Suguenot	UMP
2007	Alain Suguenot	UMP
2012	Alain Suguenot	UMP
2017	Didier Paris	LREM
2022	Didier Paris	LREM
2024	René Lioret	RN

== Election results ==
=== 2024 ===
Candidate	Party	Alliance	First round			Second round		
Candidate	Party	Alliance	Votes	%	+/–	Votes	%	+/–
René Lioret	RN		26,514	45.31	+21.61	28,677	50.04	+4.28
Didier Paris	REN	Ensemble	18,128	30.98	+4.15	28,633	49.96	-4.28
Jérôme Flache	PCF	NFP	11,296	19.30	-0.36	withdrew		
Nicolas Baudot	DVD		1,531	2.62	new			
Françoise Petet	LO		818	1.40	+0.45			
Arnaud Cheront	DIV		233	0.40	new			
Votes			58,520	100.00		57,310	100.00	
Valid votes			58,520	96.69	-1.18	57,310	94.26	+3.72
Blank votes			1,464	2.42	+0.86	2,611	4.29	-3.16
Null votes			540	0.89	+0.32	880	1.45	-0.56
Turnout			60,524	70.73	+20.40	60,801	71.05	+23.45
Abstentions			25,052	29.27	-20.40	24,769	28.95	-23.45
Registered voters			85,570			85,576		
Result			RN GAIN FROM RE					

=== 2022 ===
Legislative Election 2022: Côte-d'Or's 5th constituency
Party	Candidate	Votes	%	±%
LREM (Ensemble)	Didier Paris	11,326	26.83	-10.32
RN	René Lioret	10,005	23.70	+6.56
PCF (NUPÉS)	Isabelle de Almeida	8,299	19.66	+1.35
LR (UDC)	Charlotte Fougère	5,620	13.31	−11.58
DVD	Hervé Moreau	2,924	6.93	N/A
REC	Denis Jordan	1,843	4.37	N/A
DVG	Clélia Robert	1,430	3.39	N/A
Others	N/A	762	-	−
Turnout		42,209	50.33	+0.11
2nd round result
LREM (Ensemble)	Didier Paris	20,031	54.24	+0.46
RN	René Lioret	16,897	45.76	N/A
Turnout		33,558	51.44	+7.64
LREM hold				

=== 2017 ===
Candidate	Label	First round		Second round	
Candidate	Label	Votes	%	Votes	%
Didier Paris	REM	15,428	37.15	17,822	53.78
Hubert Poullot	LR	10,336	24.89	15,319	46.22
René Lioret	FN	7,120	17.14		
Élisabeth Kremer	FI	4,041	9.73		
Jérôme Flache	PS	1,947	4.69		
Carole Bernhard	ECO	1,121	2.70		
Jacques Cardot	PCF	496	1.19		
Patrick Muller	ECO	431	1.04		
Édouard Clair	DIV	356	0.86		
Françoise Petet	EXG	255	0.61		
Votes		41,531	100.00	33,141	100.00
Valid votes		41,531	97.94	33,141	89.62
Blank votes		633	1.49	2,846	7.70
Null votes		240	0.57	991	2.68
Turnout		42,404	50.22	36,978	43.80
Abstentions		42,038	49.78	47,455	56.20
Registered voters		84,442		84,433	
Source: Ministry of the Interior

=== 2012 ===
2012 legislative election in Cote-D'Or's 5th constituency
Candidate	Party	First round		Second round	
Candidate	Party	Votes	%	Votes	%
Alain Suguenot	UMP	21,494	43.20%	26,876	56.24%
Daniel Cadoux	PS	15,637	31.43%	20,908	43.76%
Rémy Boursot	FN	7,222	14.52%		
Delphine Helle	FG	1,804	3.63%		
Alexandre Sokolovitch	EELV	1,096	2.20%		
Patrick Hillon	MoDem	801	1.61%		
Magalie Michaud	DLR	456	0.92%		
Agnès Meyniel	AEI	315	0.63%		
Eugène Krempp	Cap 21	300	0.60%		
Françoise Petet	LO	199	0.40%		
Yves Hollinger	NPA	149	0.30%		
Viviane Bienfait	SP	145	0.29%		
Lise-Marie Buet	MPF	134	0.27%		
Valid votes		49,752	98.63%	47,784	97.40%
Spoilt and null votes		692	1.37%	1,274	2.60%
Votes cast / turnout		50,444	60.80%	49,058	59.14%
Abstentions		32,522	39.20%	33,898	40.86%
Registered voters		82,966	100.00%	82,956	100.00%

=== 2007 ===
Legislative Election 2007: Côte-d'Or's 5th constituency
Party	Candidate	Votes	%	±%
UMP	Alain Suguenot	25,312	52.68	+11.80
PS	Jean-Claude Robert	11,937	24.85	−12.74
MoDem	Sophie Vielfaure	3,165	6.59	N/A
FN	Pierre Jaboulet-Vercherre	2,693	5.61	−7.30
LV	Christine Durnerin	1,112	2.31	N/A
LCR	Yves Hollinger	996	2.07	+0.88
Others	N/A	2,830	-	−
Turnout		48,847	60.02	−5.54
UMP hold				

=== 2002 ===
Legislative Election 2002: Côte-d'Or's 5th constituency
Party	Candidate	Votes	%	±%
UMP	Alain Suguenot	20,410	40.88	+13.34
PS	François Patriat	18,770	37.59	+4.35
FN	Nicola Jaboulet-Vercherre	6,446	12.91	−5.23
CPNT	Michel Couturier	735	1.47	N/A
LCR	Yvette Andre	594	1.19	−0.79
MPF	Jean-Maurice de Truchis	502	1.01	−2.74
MEI	Nicole Essayan	476	0.95	−0.90
EXG	Jacques Thomas	464	0.93	N/A
LO	Françoise Petet	442	0.89	−1.44
MNR	Gérard Allexant	385	0.77	N/A
GE	Jean-Noël Faccini	274	0.55	N/A
DIV	Jean-Baptiste Bouhey	231	0.46	N/A
DIV	Chantal Charau	117	0.23	N/A
DIV	Henri Boucher	83	0.17	N/A
Turnout		50,866	65.56	−3.71
2nd round result
UMP	Alain Suguenot	24,313	51.18	+5.02
PS	François Patriat	23,194	48.82	−5.02
Turnout		49,114	63.31	−10.43
UMP gain from PS				

=== 1997 ===
Legislative Election 1997: Côte-d'Or's 5th constituency
Party	Candidate	Votes	%	±%
PS	François Patriat	16,351	33.24	
RPR	Alain Suguenot	13,551	27.54	
FN	Pierre Jaboulet-Vercherre	8,926	18.14	
PCF	Jean Guerret	2,209	4.49	
LDI	Jean-Maurice de Truchis	1,843	3.75	
LV	Jean-Jacques Bernard	1,731	3.52	
DIV	Jean-Noël Couzon	1,553	3.16	
LO	Régis Mayet	1,148	2.33	
LCR	Nathalie Malka	974	1.98	
MEI	Max Chaudron	912	1.85	
Turnout		51,629	69.27	
2nd round result
PS	François Patriat	27,853	53.84	
RPR	Alain Suguenot	23,877	46.16	
Turnout		54,947	73.74	
PS gain from RPR				
