= Plantagenet style =

Medieval architectural style in western France

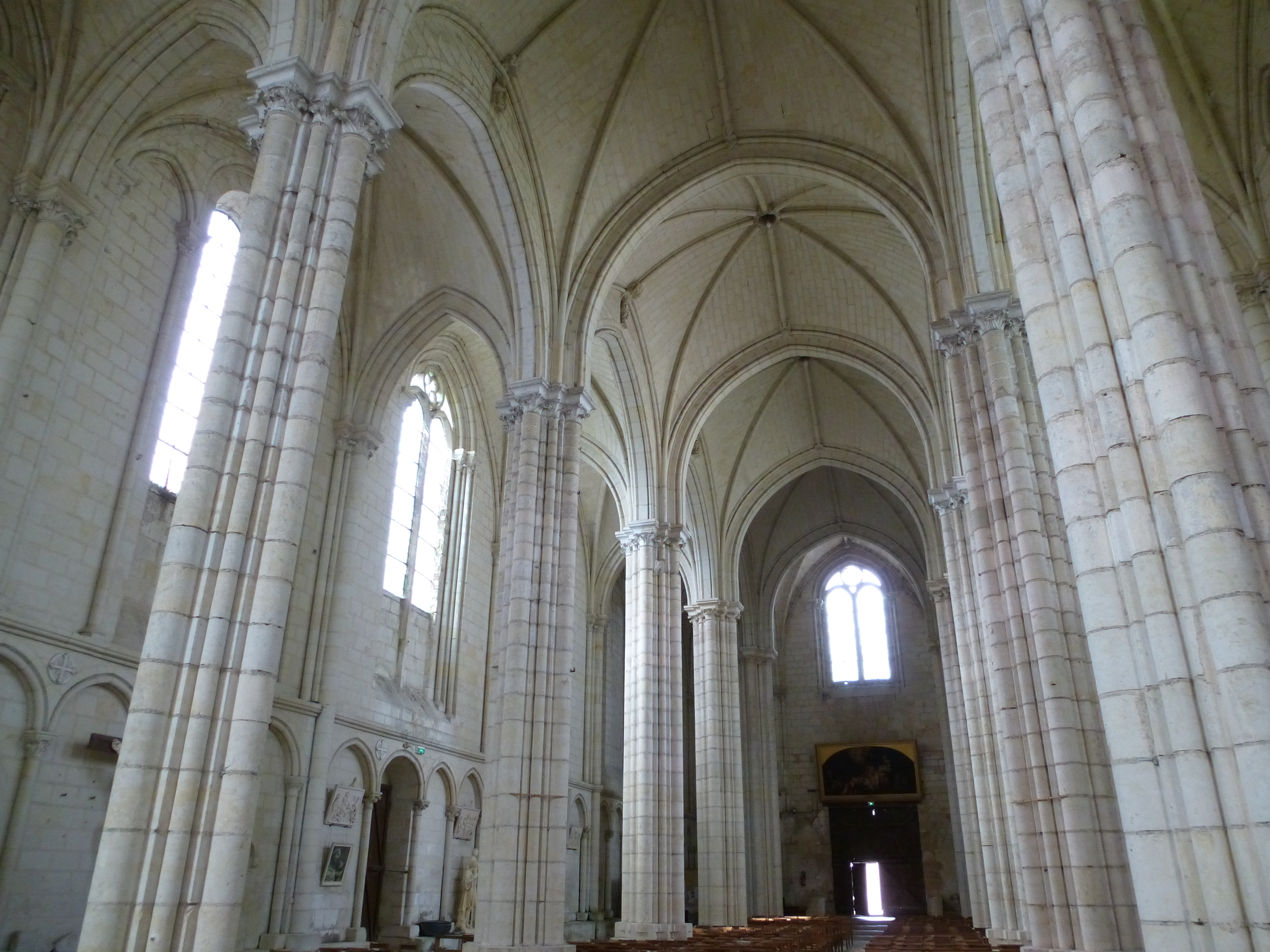
Church of Our Lady FR, after 1214, in Le Puy-Notre-Dame, Department of Maine-et-Loire

The Plantagenet style or Angevine Gothic is an architectural style of western France, mainly of the second half of 12th and the 13th century. By Eugène Viollet-le-Duc it was called "Style ogivale Plantagenêt", something like "Plantagenet Ribs Style". It is named by the House of Anjou-Plantagenet. It is characterized by cross-ribbed vaults and extremely curved relatively domelike vaults.

== Conditions ==
=== Preceding modes of vaulting ===
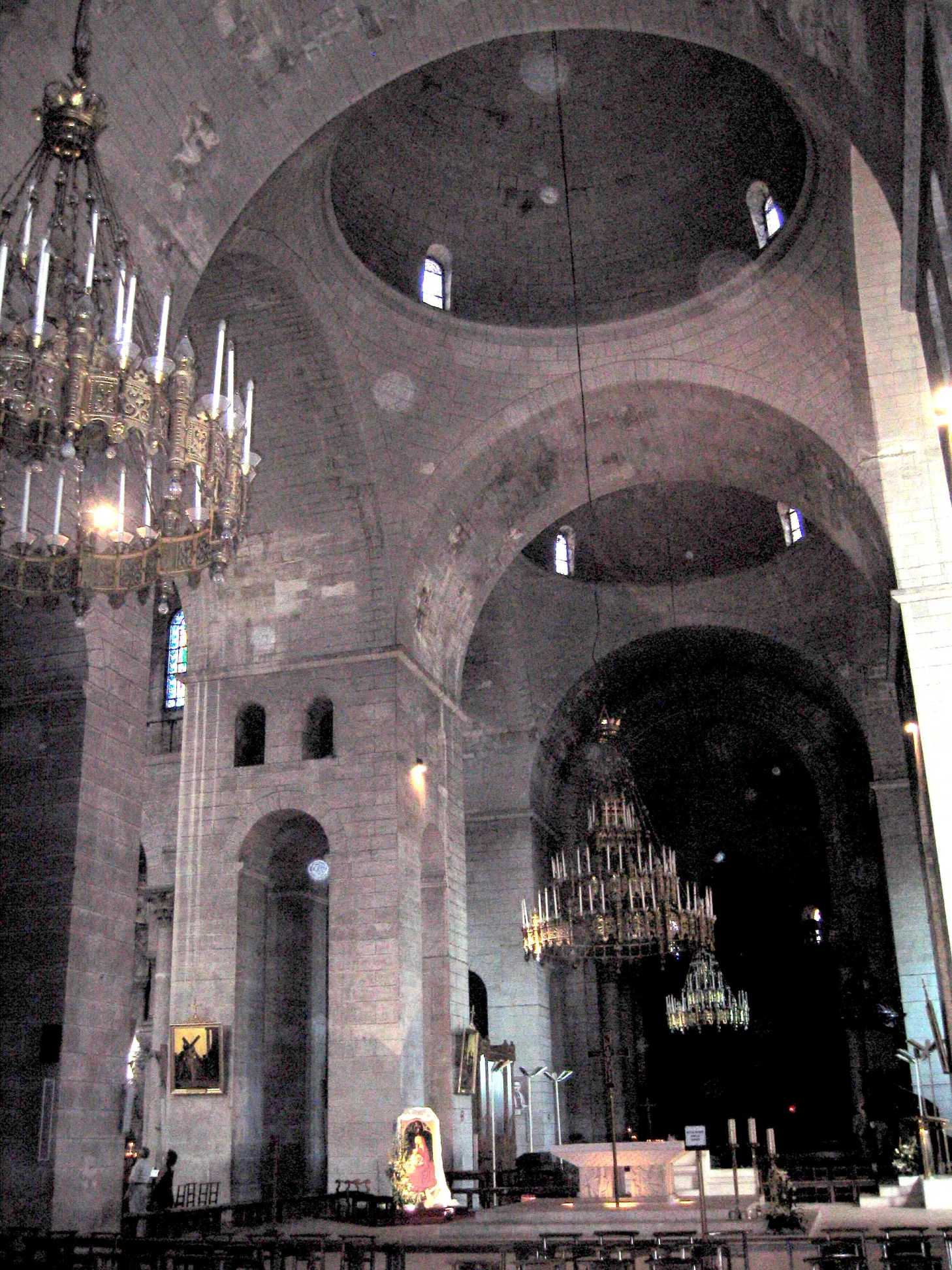
Périgueux Cathedral with „Byzantine“ domes

In the 11th and early 12th century, in southwestern France, barrel vaults were preferred for church ceilings, as well of architectural basilicas as of the quite numerous hall churches. In the 12th century those barrels could have pointed arch reliefs. Very few, but important churches, Périgueux Cathedral, Angoulême Cathedral and Fontevraud Abbey, were vaulted in another way; not only their crossings but also naves and in two of them transepts and choirs were covered with compound domes, possibly after Byzantine examples.

=== Political conditions ===
In 1128, the wedding of the Norman princess, Roman-German-Emperor's widow and heir of the English Throne Matilda with Geoffrey Plantagenet, Count of Anjou, laid the base of the rule of the House of Anjou-Plantagenet in England and parts of France. Their son Henry marrying Eleanor of Aquitaine in 1152 gained the rule over the southwest of France. But after the Battle of Bouvines in 1214, the Duchy of Anjou north of Loire River was controlled by the French crown.

Under the rule of Louis VII, since 1131 and allone since 1137 King of France, Eleanor's divorced first husband, about 1140 the Gothic architecture was initiated in the surroundings of Paris, the Île-de-France, in those days the French Crown land and some adjacent territories. It is characterized by peaked arches and by cross-ribbed vaults, derived from groined vaults.

== Vaults ==
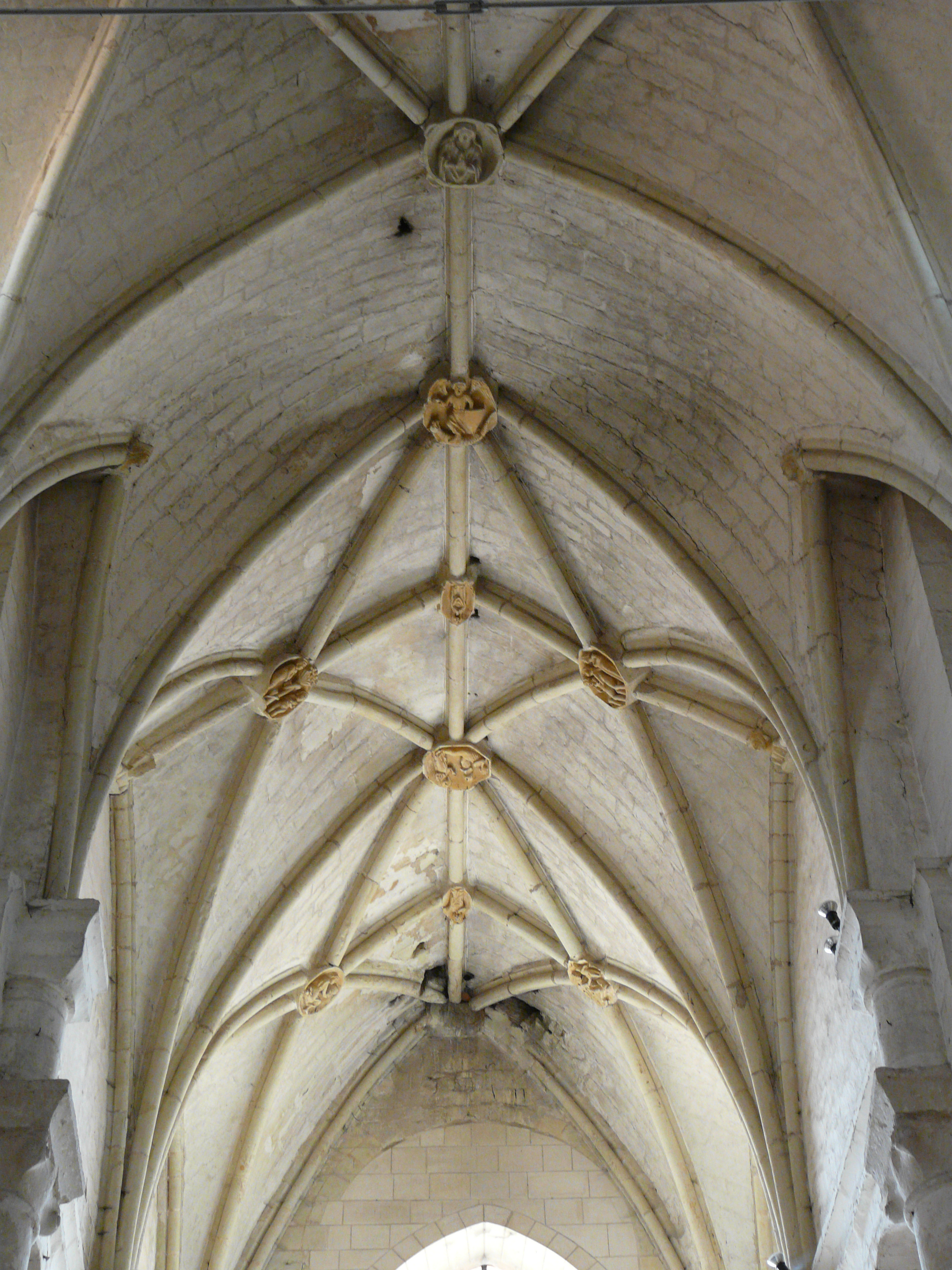
St-Pierre FR (12th/13th century) in Airvault, net-vaulted

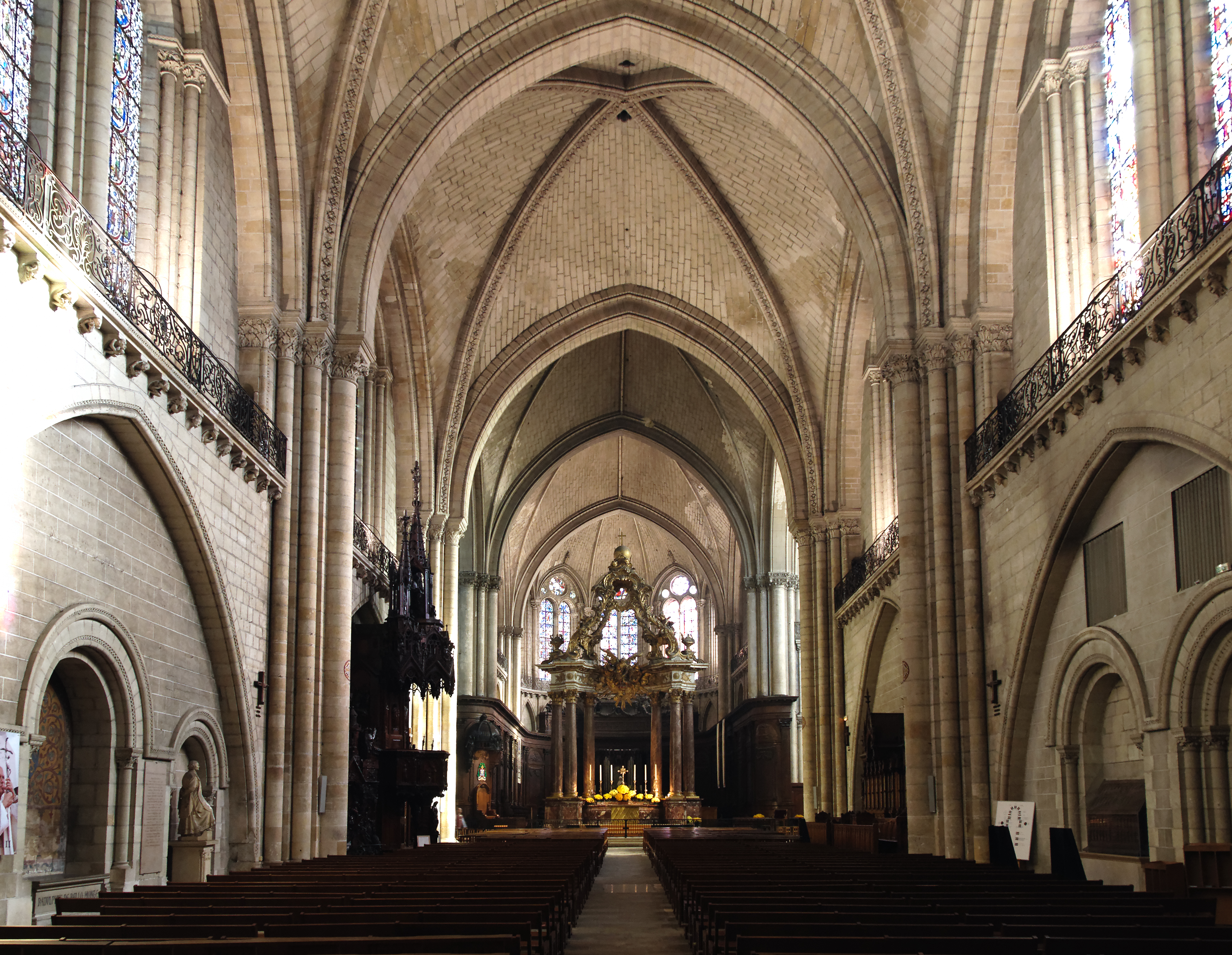
Nave of Angers Cathedral

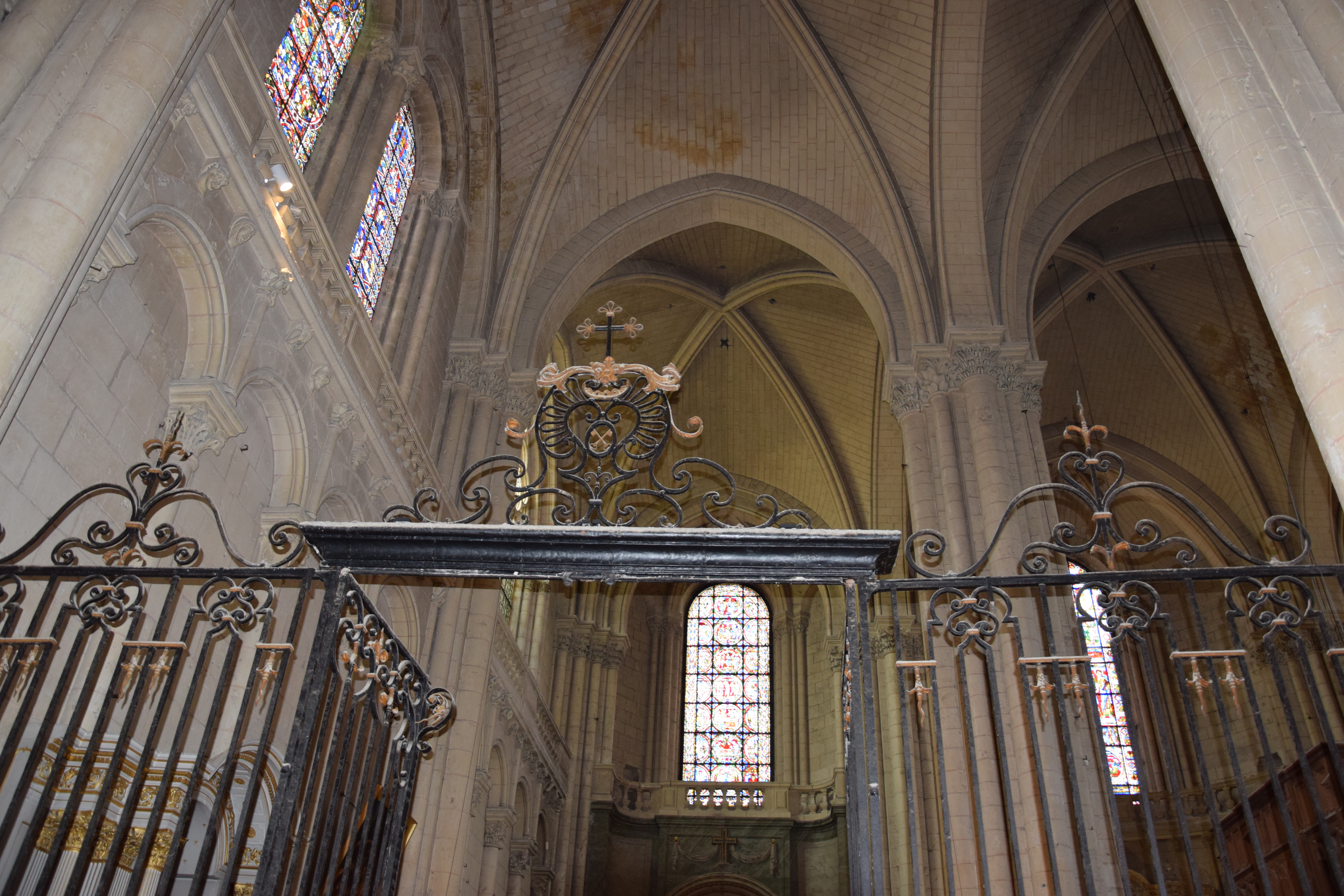
Choir of Poitiers Cathedral

In Angevine Western France, the principle of rib vaults was acquired, as it allowed to build vaults lighter than before. But here rather reliefs derived from dome were preferred. Eventually the stiffening consisted of four ribs, but more often, eight ribs were applied, four parietal ribs in addition to the four diagonal ribs. Angers Cathedral, incepted in 1148, has a footplan similar to the domed buildings of Angoulême, Périgueux and Fontevrauld, but rib vaults instead of the domes.

For hall churches, the application of domical rib vaults instead of barrel vaults provided an aesthetic improvement, this way the halls became as transparent in transversal direction as in longitudinal direction. The most prominent example is Poitiers Cathedral, incepted in 1162. Only few of the older hall churches have groined vaults, though crypts had been constructed as halls of groined cross vaults since long ago.

In some single Angevine buildings, ribs were used for barrel vaults and upon chapels and choirs with ceilings consisting of a barrel and half a dome, resulting in early kinds of net-vaulting.

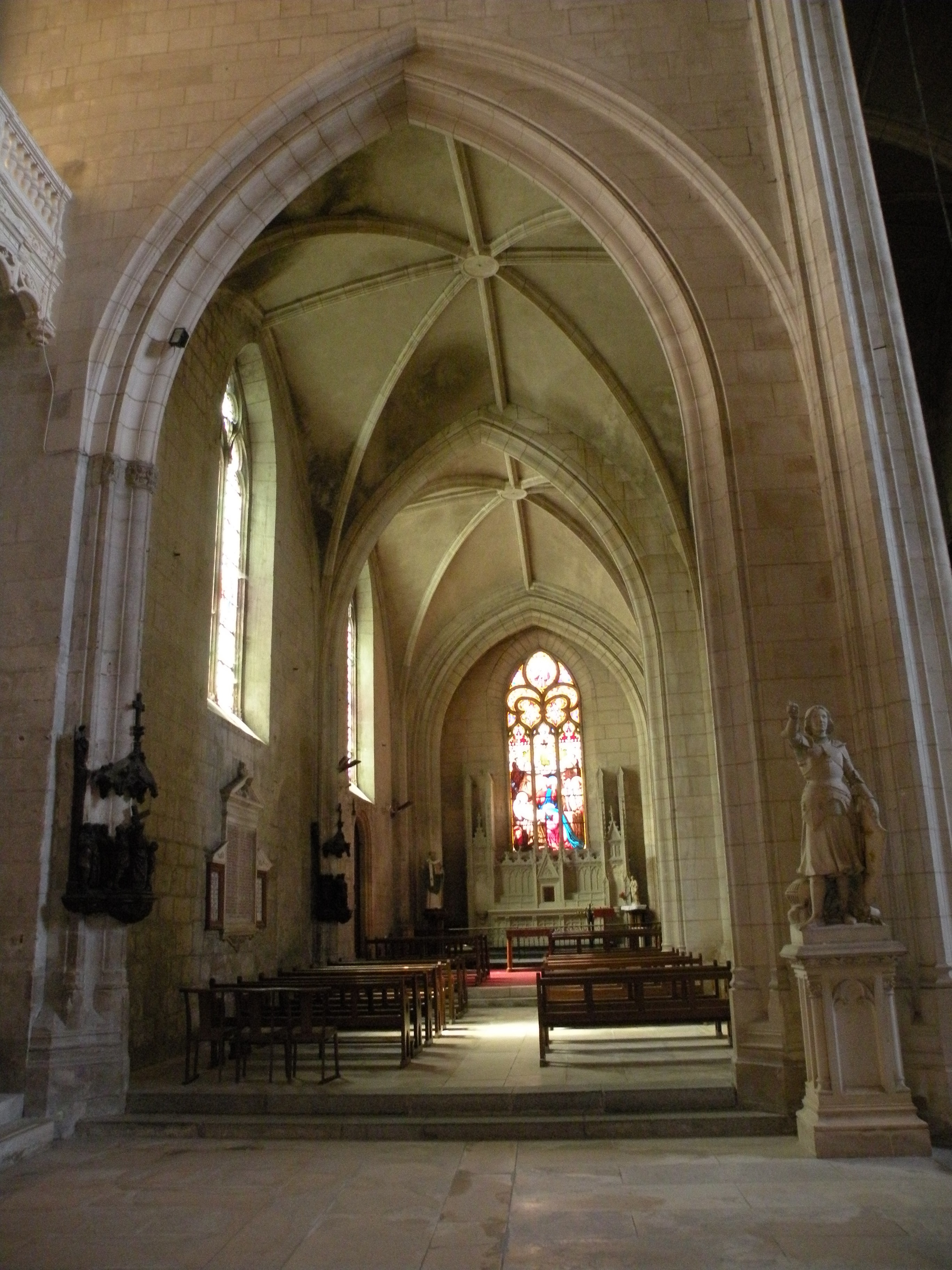
Notre-Dame, 1491–1550, in Niort, Angevine-Flamboyant

Though Angevine Gothic mainly is a kind of Early Gothic, in the region where it had been established, the mode of eight rib vaults was maintained up to the end of Gothic style, but curving and steepness decreased. A good example is Church of Our Lady FR in Niort, built from 1491 to 1550 in Flamboyant Style.

== Walls ==
As the sides of the vaults of Angevine vaults were steeper than those of Île-de-France style, they caused less horizontal forces and therefore required less (outer) buttresses. The connection of rib vaults and peaked arches of doors and windows was less consequent than around Paris. In the façades of Western French churches, the first pointed arches had appeared already in structurally totally Romanesque Buildings like Notre-Dame la Grande in Poitiers, on the other hand the Gothic-vaulted parts not only of Poitiers Cathedral have round arched windows.

== Influence abroad – "Westphalian" vaults ==
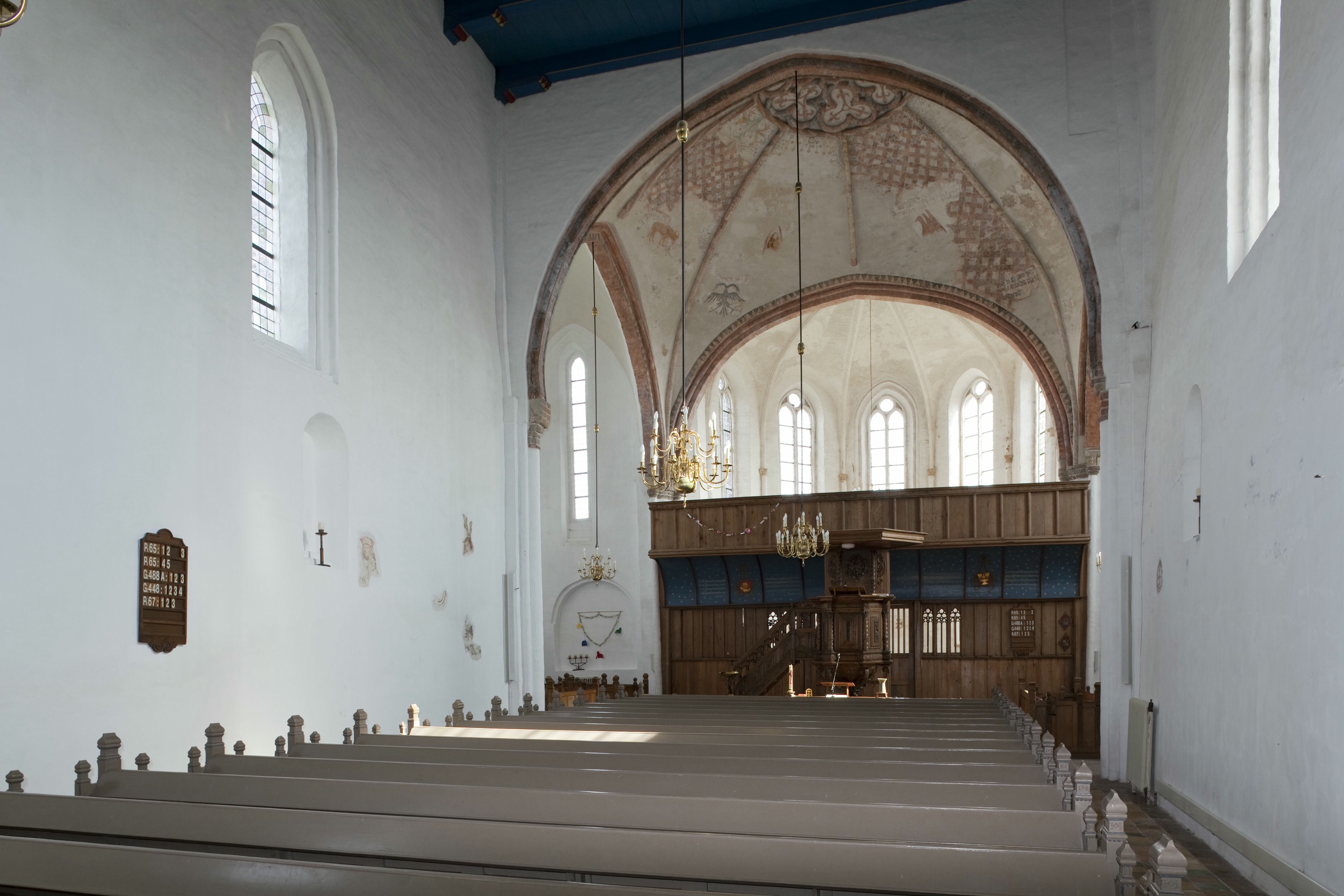
Westphalian vault of Holwierde Church NL/DE, Groningen Province

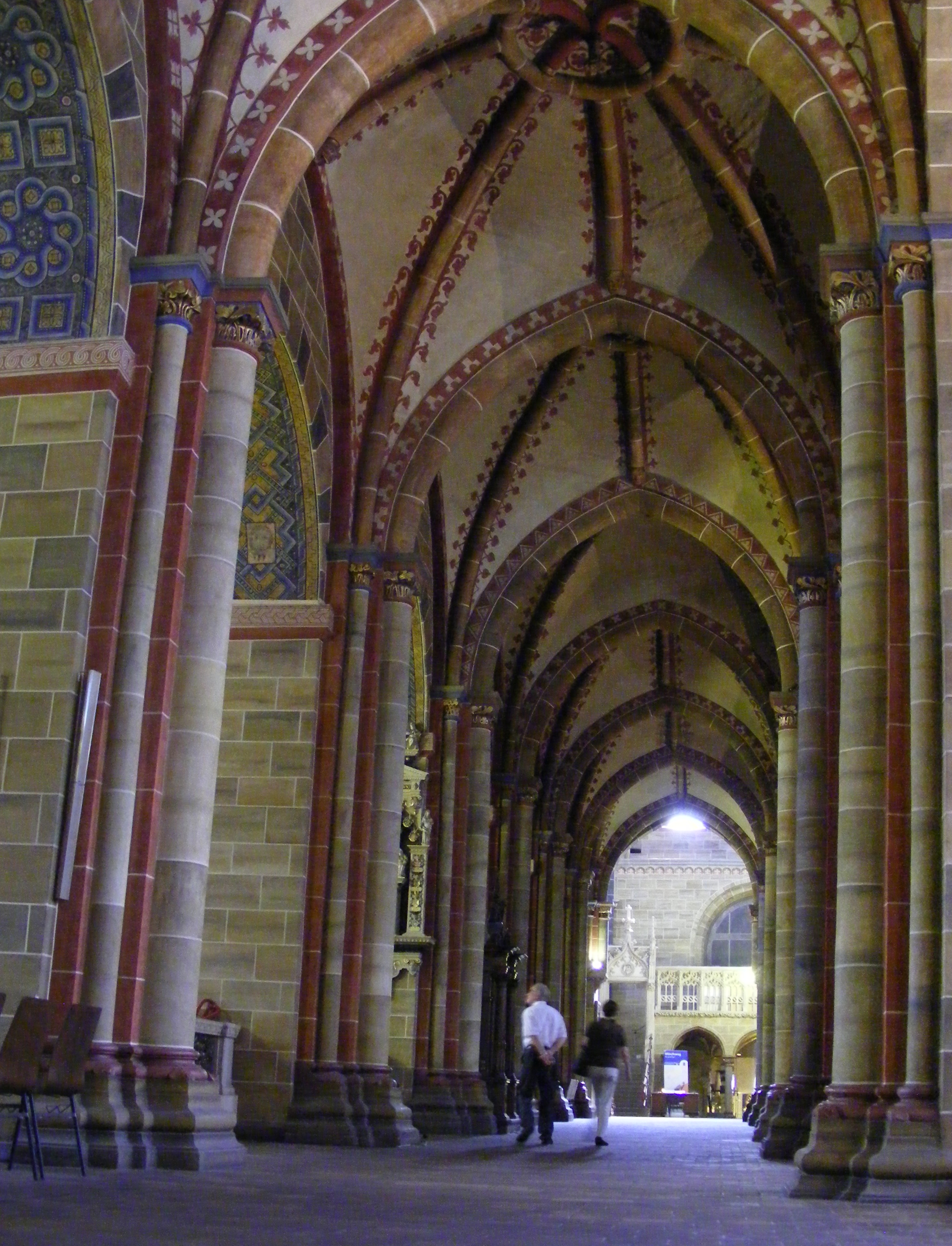
Angevine vaults in the southern aisle of Bremen Cathedral, about 1225

Since about 1200 vaults after Angevine example were built in Westphalia. The assumed incentive was that Bernard II, Lord of Lippe, as a follower of Henry the Lion, accompanied the duke for about a year in his "English" exile and there saw Poitiers Cathedral being built. The first examples are Große Marienkirche DE in Lippstadt and the church of the Cistercian Marienfeld Abbey. Both initially outside showed Romanesque design. The type of vaults spread to northern Germany and (at that time not divided from Germany) the northern Netherlands, characterizing the early Gothic of those regions. In the Netherlands they sometimes are called "melon-shaped" or "Westphalian" vaults. The style of the buildings often is considered Romano-Gothic. The adaption of the Angevine vaults east of the Rhine included further developments: Already in Marienfeld, the ribs are of sandstone, but the shells are of brick (like the walls of this nowadays plastered church). Similar is the use of materials in the Church of Our Lady (probably since 1220) in Bremen, the first Gothic four-pillars hall church of northern Germany. In many village churches, the vaults began far below half of the top level of the vaults – which is also found in village churches vaulted after the example of the Île-de-France.

== See also ==
- List of architectural styles
- Saint-Martin de Luché Church
- Abbey d'Asnières
