= Didier Paris =

French politician

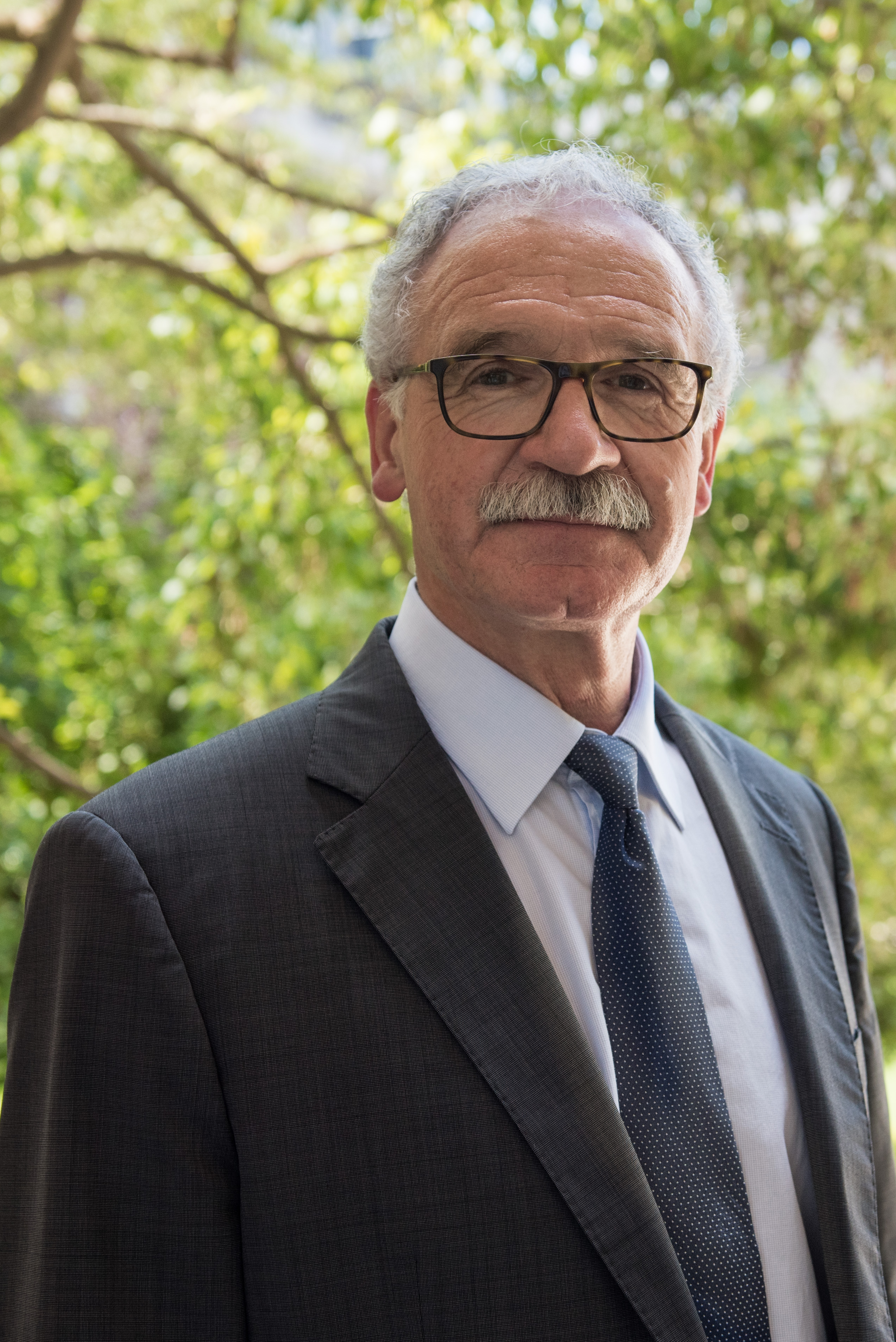

Member of the National Assembly for Côte-d'Or's 5th constituency
- Incumbent
- Assumed office 21 June 2017
- Preceded by: Alain Suguenot

Personal details
- Born: 14 February 1954 (age 72) Paris, France
- Party: Renaissance

Didier Paris (born 14 February 1954) is a French lawyer politician of Renaissance (RE) who was elected to the French National Assembly on 18 June 2017, representing the south of the department of Côte-d'Or. From 1997 till 2000, he was the sub-prefect of Beaune.

== Political career ==
In parliament, Paris serves on the Committee on Legal Affairs.

Since 2019, Paris has been serving as one of his parliamentary group's spokespersons under the leadership of its chairman Gilles Le Gendre.

In addition to his committee assignments, Paris is part of the French-Iranian Parliamentary Friendship Group. He has also been a member of the French delegation to the Parliamentary Assembly of the Organization for Security and Co-operation in Europe.

Since 2022, Paris has also been one of six National Assembly members who serve as judges of the Cour de Justice de la République (CJR).

== See also ==
- 2017 French legislative election
