= Daniel Grenon =

French politician (born 1948)

Member of the National Assembly for Yonne's 1st constituency
- Incumbent
- Assumed office 22 June 2022
- Preceded by: Guillaume Larrivé

Personal details
- Born: 31 July 1948 (age 78) Saint-Fargeau, France
- Party: National Rally (until 2024)
- Occupation: Grocer, politician

Daniel Grenon (French pronunciation: [danjɛl ɡʁənɔ̃]; born 31 July 1948) is a French politician and former grocer who has represented the 1st constituency of the Yonne department in the National Assembly since 2022. He is a former member of the National Rally (RN), having been expelled in 2024 following racist remarks he made.

== Biography ==
Grenon was born in 1948 in Saint-Fargeau, western Yonne. He was the owner of a grocery store selling regional products in the town of Toucy for several years before retiring. He was also the president of several local sports associations.

Grenon was a longtime supporter of the National Rally before getting involved in politics. In the 2021 regional election, he was a candidate for the Regional Council of Bourgogne-Franche-Comté on the list led by Julien Odoul. In the 2021 departmental election, he contested the canton of Cœur de Puisaye but was defeated in the second round.

For the 2022 legislative election, he contested the 1st constituency of Yonne, taking the seat in the second round by defeating Europe Ecology – The Greens (EELV) candidate Florence Loury (who ran under the New Ecological and Social People's Union alliance) with 51.1% of the vote. He was reelected in 2024, but expelled from the National Rally shortly afterwards, after comments he made regarding Maghrebis. He has since sat with the non-inscrits in the National Assembly.

In Parliament, Grenon sat on the Committee on Sustainable Development, Spatial and Regional Planning from 2022 to 2024, when he became a member of the Committee on National Defence and the Armed Forces.
