= Asnières Abbey =

Former monastery in Maine-et-Loire, France

Coordinates: 47°10′32″N 0°11′27″W

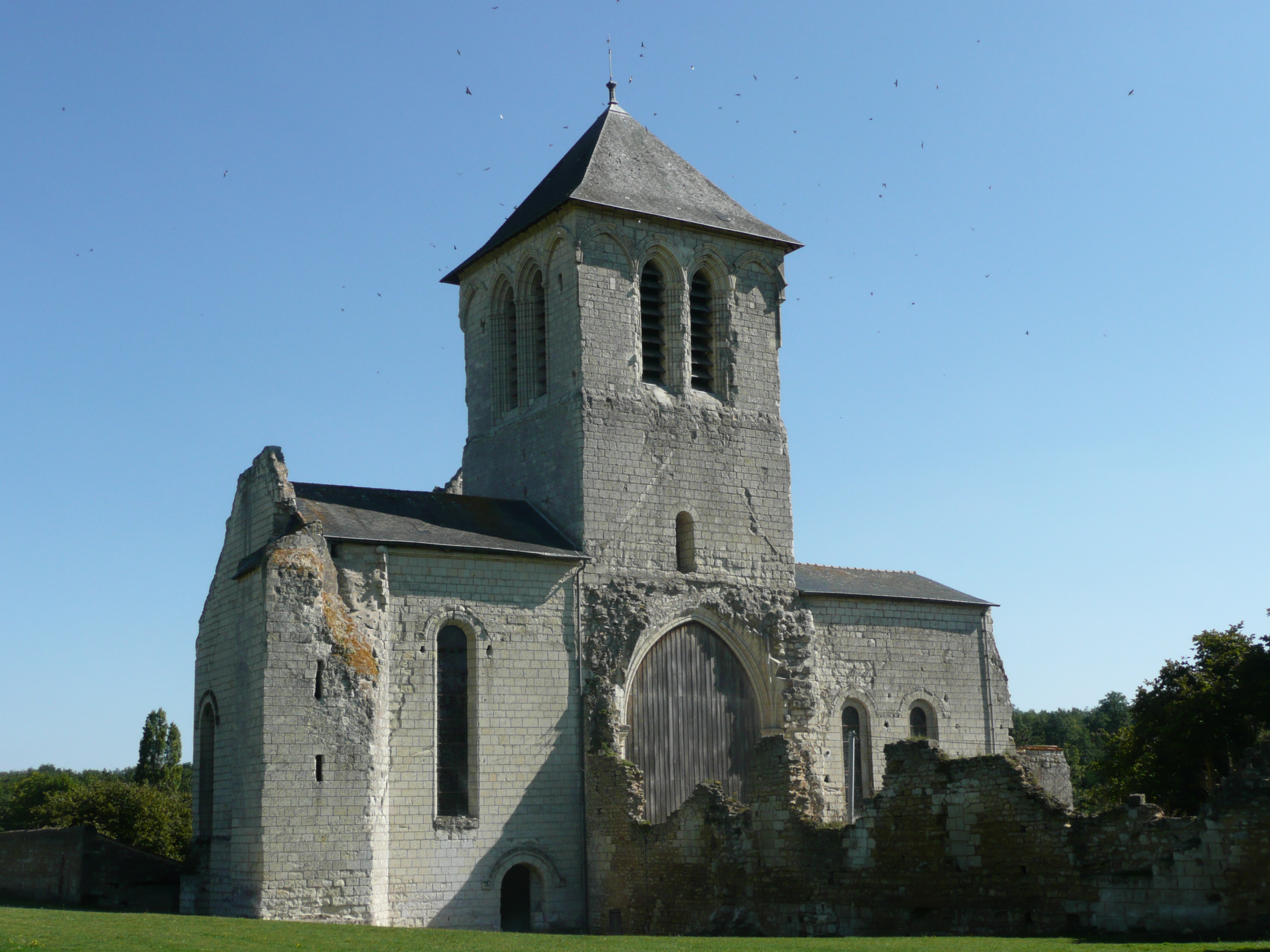
- Interactive map of Asnières Abbey
- Location: France

Asnières Abbey (French: Abbaye d'Asnières) is a former Benedictine monastery in Cizay-la-Madeleine, Maine-et-Loire, France.

== History ==
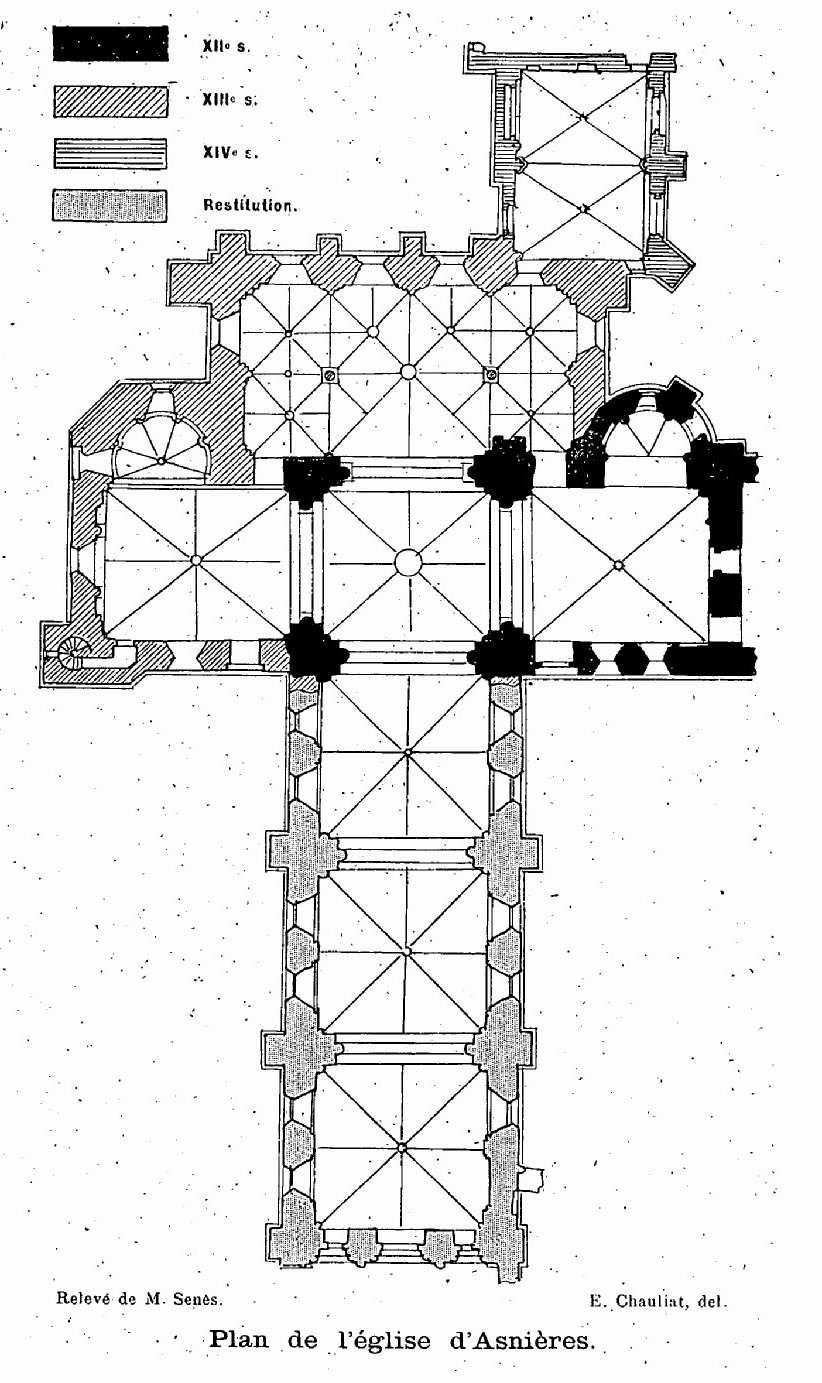
Plan of the abbey church with reconstruction of the nave (French Archaeological Congress, 1910)

The wooded site, owned by Giraud II Berlai, Lord of Montreuil (Montreuil-Bellay), was initially granted to the monks of Saint-Nicolas d'Angers. When the monks lost interest, Bernard de Tiron (d. 1117), a companion of Robert d'Arbrissel (founder of Fontevraud Abbey, motherhouse of the Order of Fontevraud), established a Benedictine priory there, which became an abbey in 1129.

The abbey enjoyed great prosperity in the Middle Ages. In 1133, Giraud II Berlai brought rich gifts to Asnières for the construction of a new church for the burial of the lords of Montreuil. Thanks to this generosity, and with the new advances in art, a new type of construction appeared, known as Angevin Gothic or Plantagenet style. In 1137, Giraud compensated the monks of Saint-Nicolas, who then remembered their rights and tried to assert them.

The abbey's decline began with the Wars of Religion (1562-1569). Montreuil-Bellay was a stronghold and arsenal for both sides in turn. The abbey was pillaged in 1569 by the Huguenots: 30 monks were massacred, the roofs burned down along with the bell tower, and the cloister disappeared along with the refectory and dormitory. It was partially restored by Abbé Verdier in 1635. It remained aloof from the religious reforms and refused to join the new congregations. By 1650, only 6 monks remained. By 1746, only two monks remained, and the abbey was attached to the Jesuit college in La Flèche.

In 1790, it was sold as national property to Joseph de la Selle d'Echuilly. He built a residence on the property, which burned down shortly after completion. He sold the property in parcels, which were then used for farming. The church was converted into a fodder shed. In 1857, the nave was demolished to salvage the stones. In 1901, the ruins were acquired by Monsieur Chappée and Monsieur de la Brière, who restored the monument. Excavations and exhumations began in 1902.

In 2012, the Maine-et-Loire département announced its intention to sell the abbey. The commune of Cizay-la-Madeleine agreed to purchase the property.

Since April 9, 2014, Asnières Abbey has been privately owned, purchased by politician Alain Suguenot and his wife. It remains open to visitors.

== Protection ==
The building was listed as a monument historique on February 10, 1909. In 1950, Mr. Chappé donated it to the Maine-et-Loire department.

== Architecture ==
The original complex comprised a late 17th-century church (transept and choir), a late 14th-century abbey chapel, an abbot's dwelling, a cloister, a chapter house, a monastic barn, a guesthouse and a restored 17th-century polygonal dovecote.

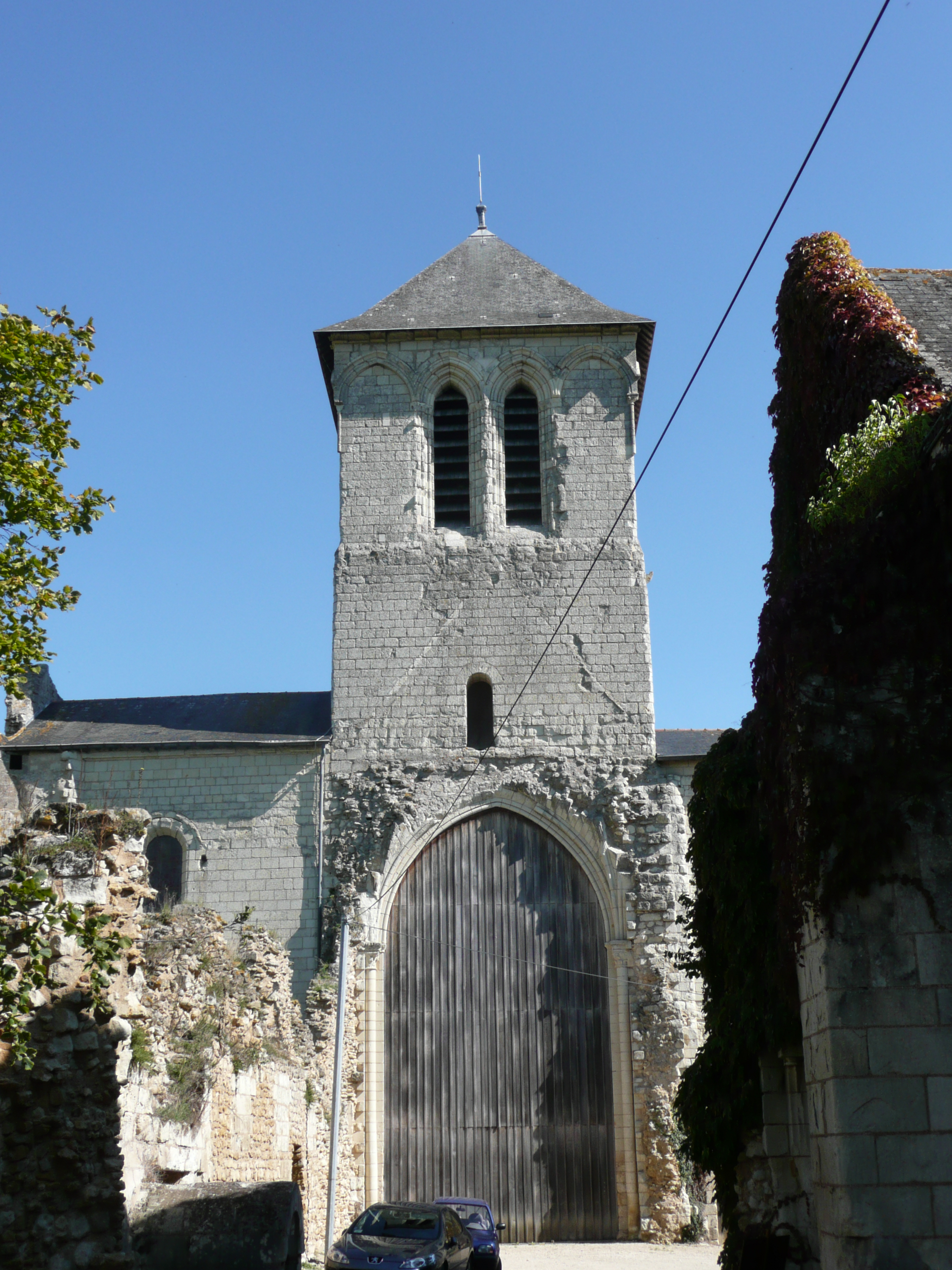

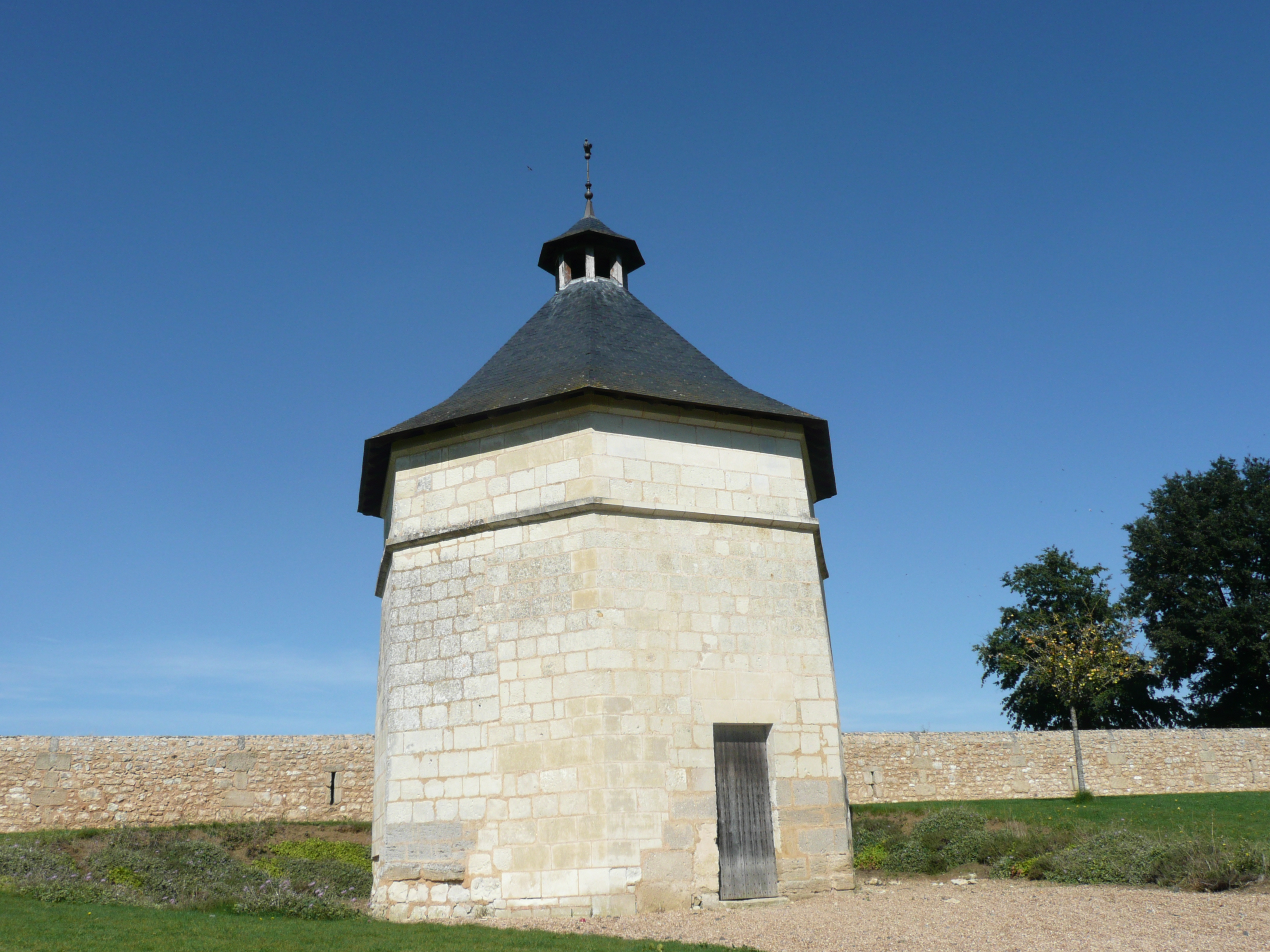
Polygonal dovecote.

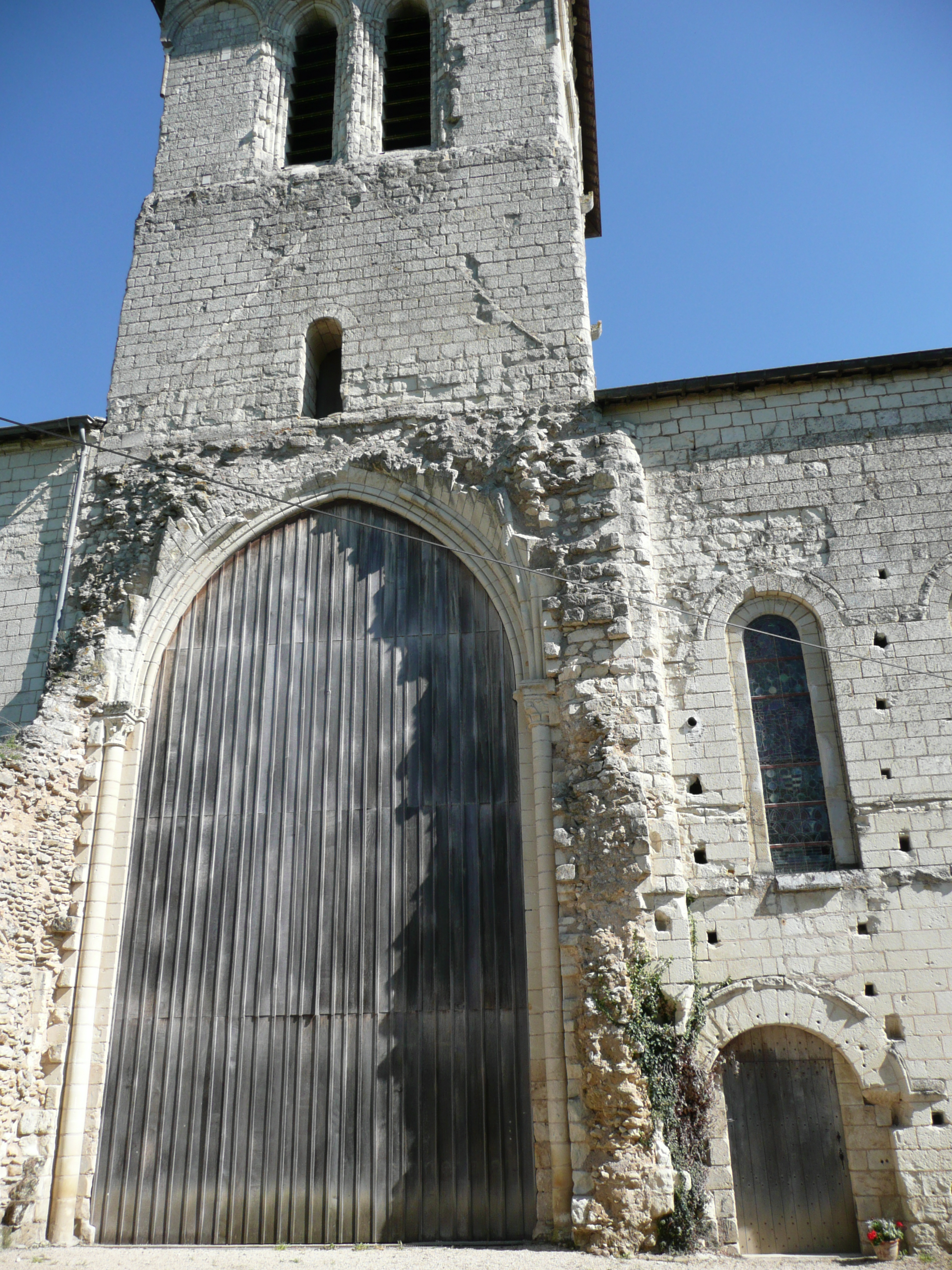

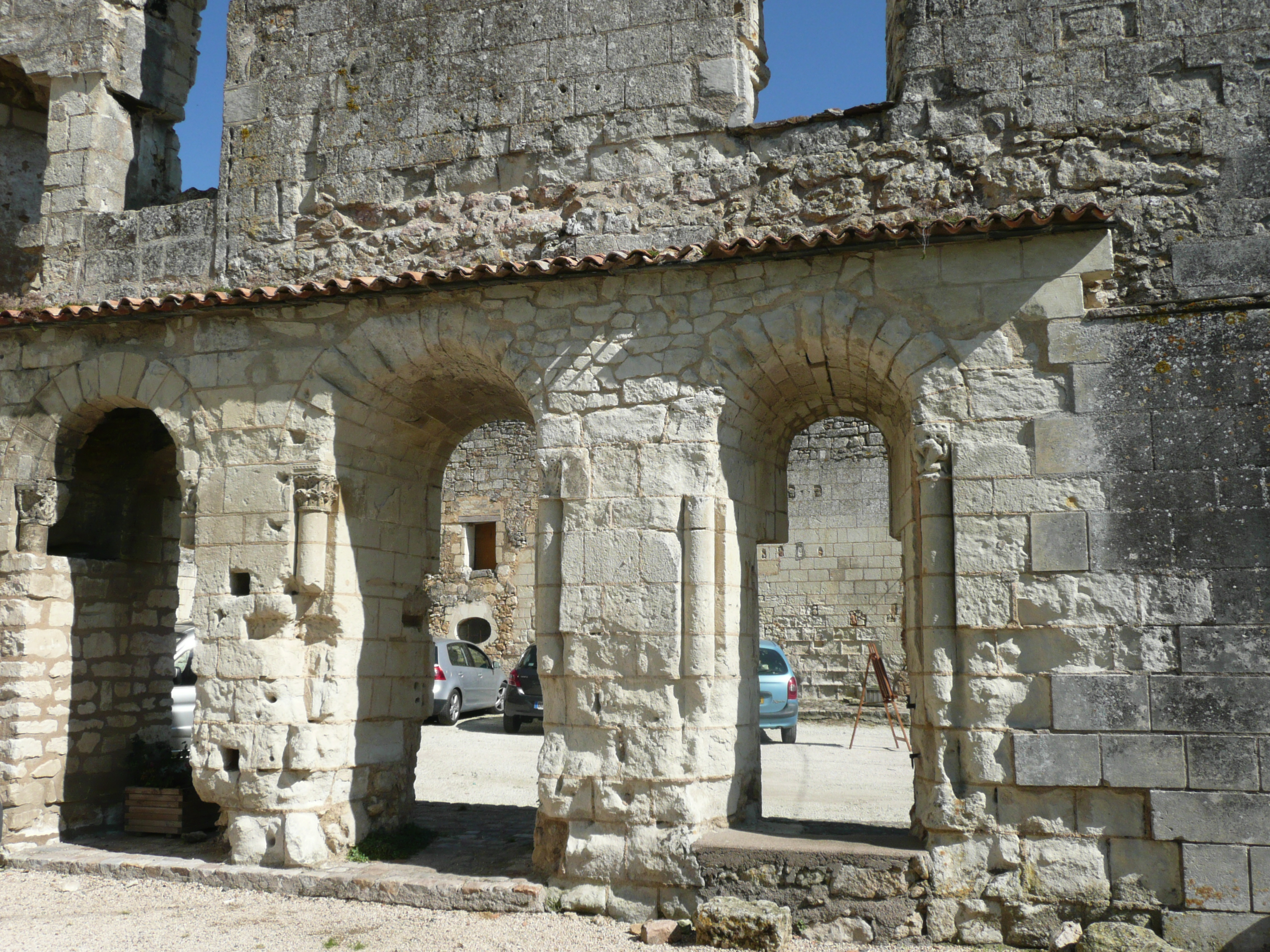
Remains of the cloister.

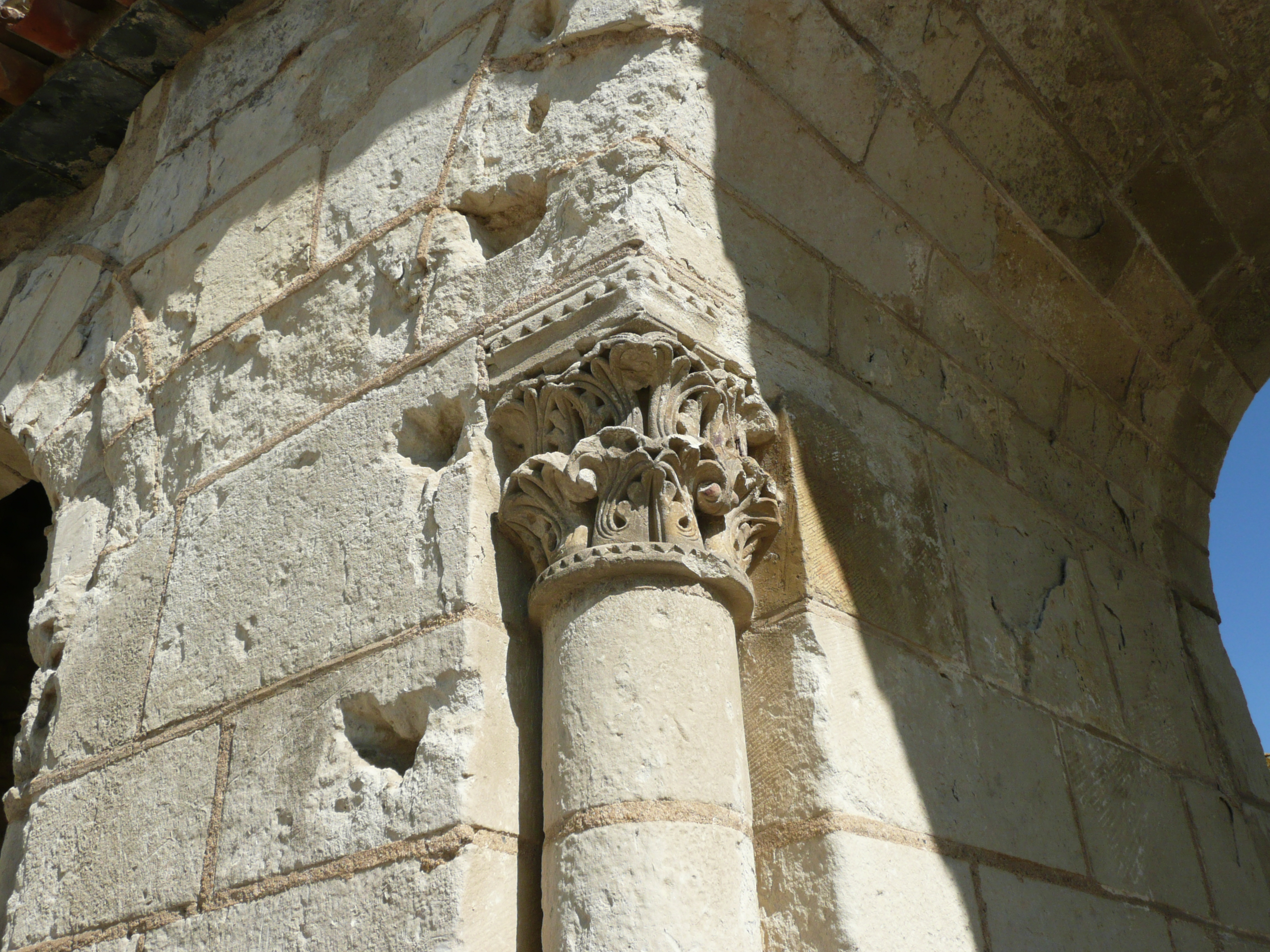

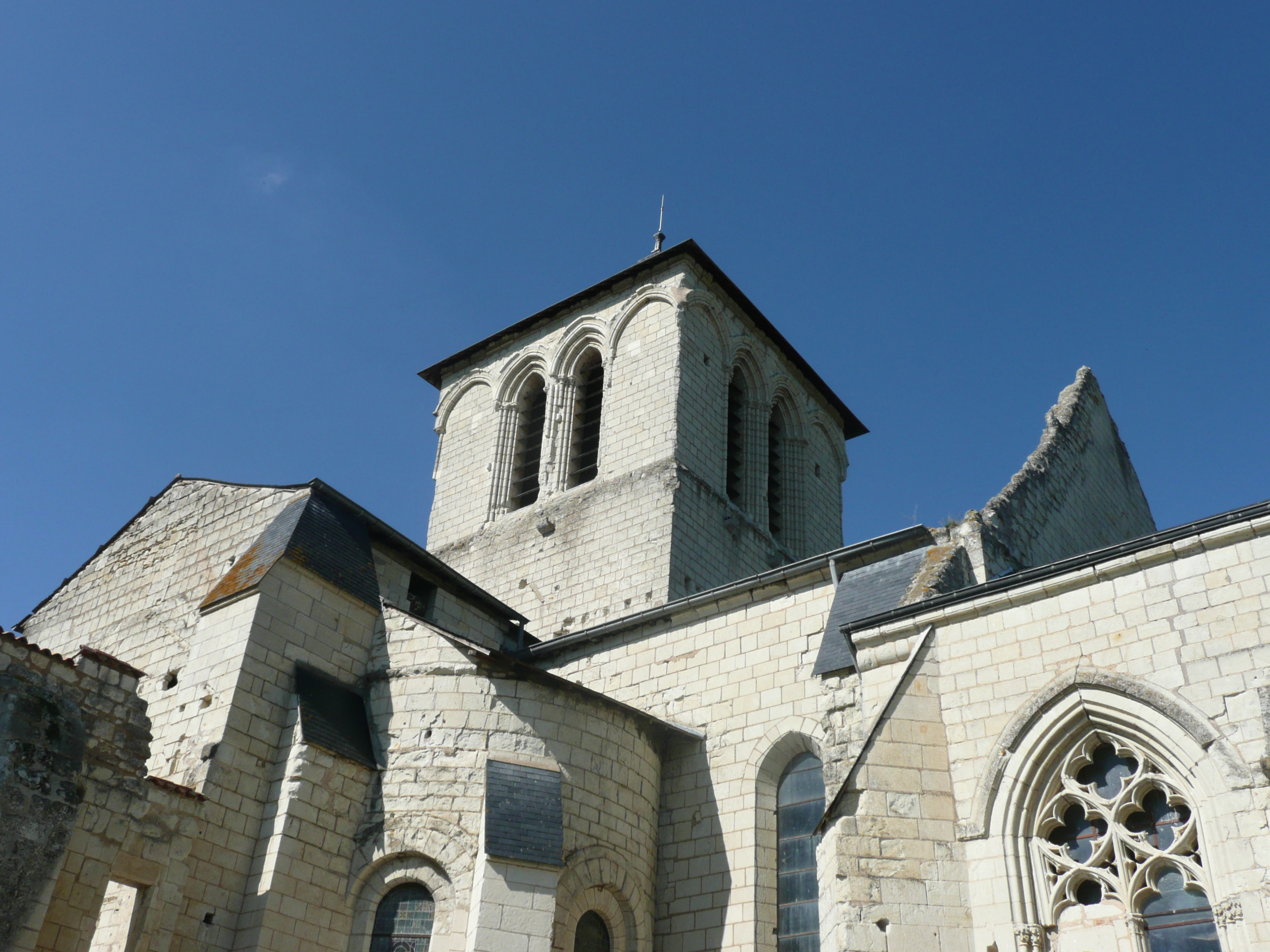

== See also ==
- List of abbeys and priories
- Alain Suguenot
- Plantagenet style

== Bibliography ==
- "Asneriæ". Gallia Christiana. 14. Paris: Firmin Didot frères: 693–695. 1856.
- Berger, Eugène (1861). "L'abbaye d'Asnières et l'ermitage des Gardelles". Revue de l'Anjou et de Maine-et-Loire. 2: 37–50.
- Chappée, J. (1907). "Carrelage de l'abbaye d'Asnières". Revue de l'art chrétien (57): 289–296.
- de La Brière; Chappée, J. (1904). "L'église et la chapelle abbatiale de l'abbaye d'Asnières et rapport sur les fouilles qui y sont faites". Revue de l'Anjou et de Maine-et-Loire: 71–99.
- Mussat, André . (1964). "Asnières". Congrès archéologique de France 122e session. Paris: Société française d'archéologie: 398–412.
- Port, Célestin (1965), H. Siraudeau et Cie (ed.), Dictionnaire historique, géographique et biographique de Maine-et-Loire et de l'ancienne province d'Anjou, vol. 1 (A-C) (2nd ed.), Angers, BNF 331411051
- Port, Célestin (1878). "Asnières-Bellay". Dictionnaire historique: géographique, et biographique de Maine-et-Maine. Paris/Angers: J.-B. Dumoulin libraire/Lachèse & Dolbeau libraires. pp. 143–145.
- Rhein, André (1911). "Asnières". Congrès archéologique de France. Guide du congrès. 77e session. Société française d'archéologie: 65–72.
