= Chailly-sur-Armançon =

- Commune
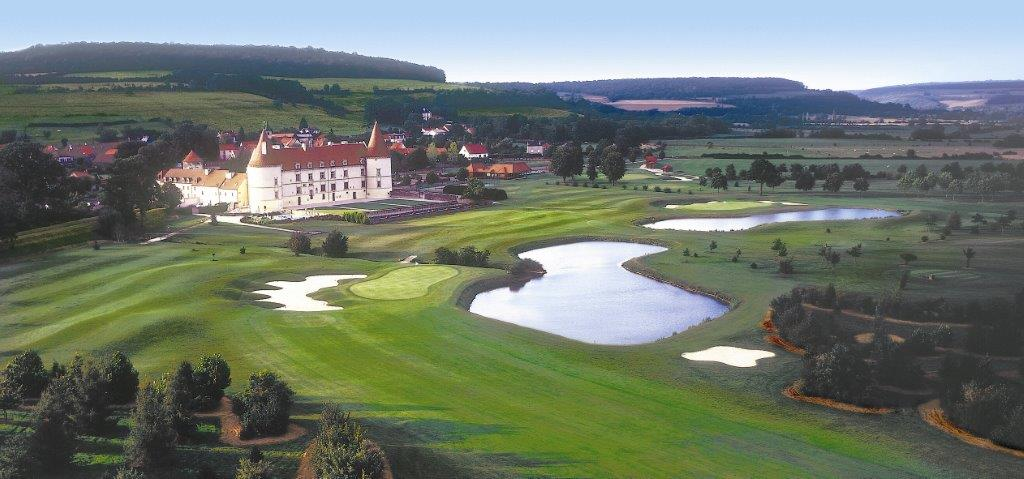
- Château and golf course in 2014
- Location of Chailly-sur-Armançon
- Location within France Location within Bourgogne-Franche-Comté
- Coordinates: 47°16′22″N 4°29′07″E
- Country: France
- Region: Bourgogne-Franche-Comté
- Department: Côte-d'Or
- Arrondissement: Beaune
- Canton: Arnay-le-Duc
- Intercommunality: CC de Pouilly-en-Auxois – Bligny-sur-Ouche

Government
  - Mayor (2020–2026): Bernard Chalon
- Area^{1}: 18.65 km^{2} (7.20 sq mi)
- Elevation: 380 m (1,250 ft)
- Highest elevation: 522 m (1,713 ft)
- Lowest elevation: 351 m (1,152 ft)
- Population (2023): 279
  - Density: 15.0/km^{2} (38.7/sq mi)
- Time zone: UTC+01:00 (CET)
  - Summer (DST): UTC+02:00 (CEST)
- INSEE/Postal code: 21128 /21320
- ^{1} French Land Register data, which excludes lakes, ponds, glaciers > 1 km^{2} (0.386 sq mi or 247 acres) and river estuaries.

Chailly-sur-Armançon (French pronunciation: [ʃaji syʁ aʁmɑ̃sɔ̃], lit. "Chailly-on-Armançon") is a commune in the Côte-d'Or department in the Bourgogne-Franche-Comté region in Eastern France.

== Demographics ==
Historical population
Year	Pop.	±% p.a.
1968	310	—
1975	245	−3.31%
1982	231	−0.84%
1990	193	−2.22%
1999	201	+0.45%
2007	277	+4.09%
2012	260	−1.26%
2017	244	−1.26%
2023	279	+2.26%
Source: INSEE

== See also ==
- Communes of the Côte-d'Or department
