= Alain Suguenot =

French politician

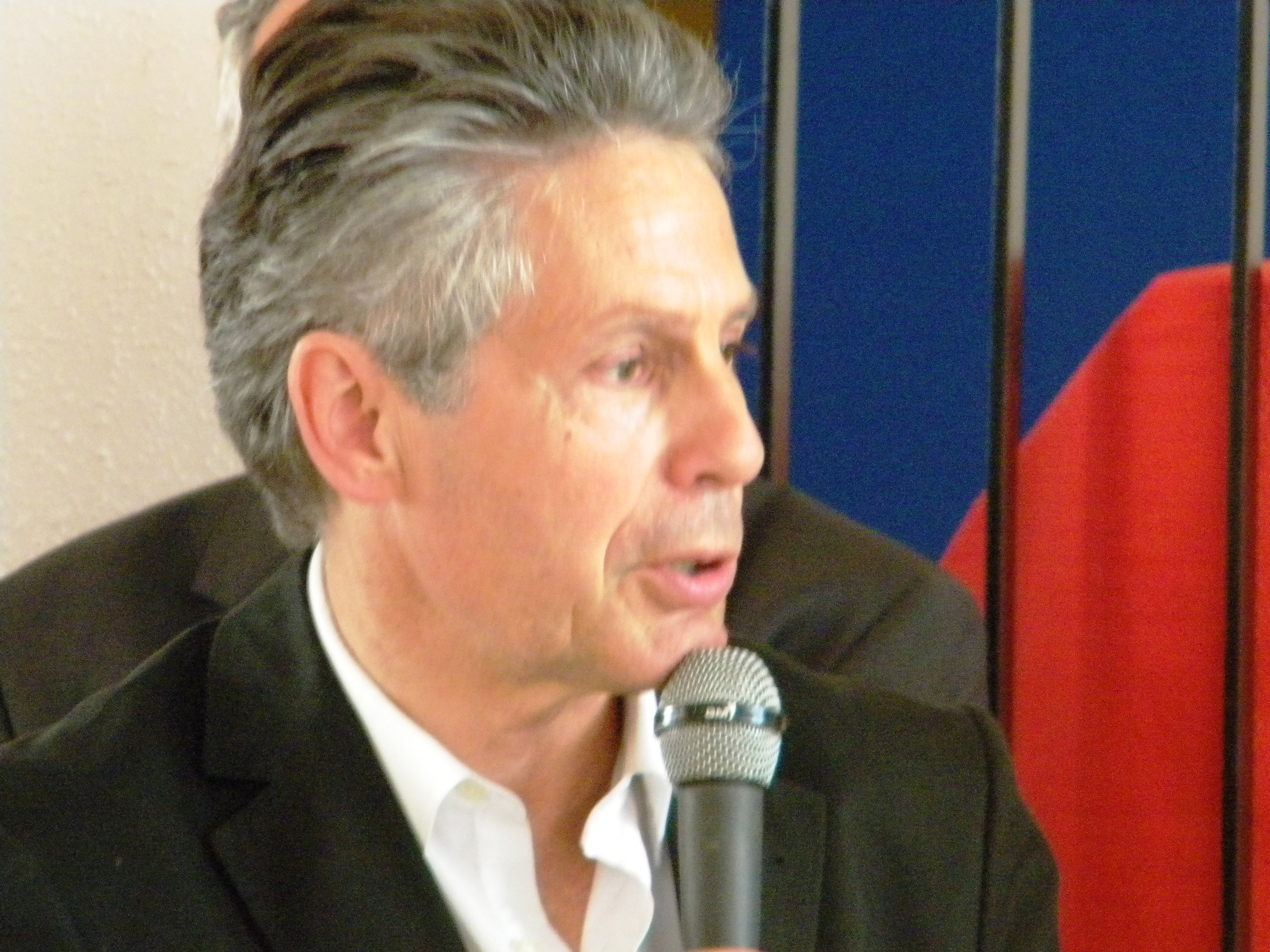
Alain Suguenot 2011

Alain Suguenot (born 17 September 1951) is a member of the National Assembly of France. He represented Côte-d'Or's 5th constituency from 2002 to 2017 as a member of the Union for a Popular Movement.

== See also ==
Abbey d'Asnières
