= Jean-Pierre Soisson =

French politician (1934–2024)

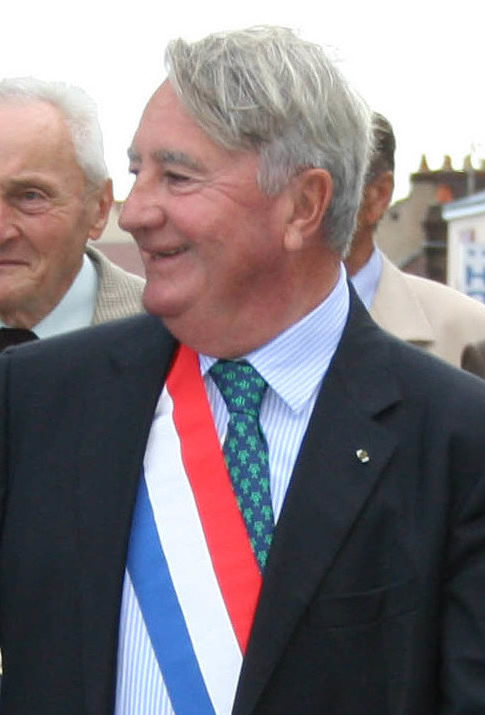
- Soisson in 2006

President of the Regional Council of Burgundy
- In office 16 March 1998 – 28 March 2004
- Preceded by: Jean-François Bazin
- Succeeded by: François Patriat

Mayor of Auxerre
- In office 14 March 1971 – 5 April 1998
- Preceded by: Jean Moreau
- Succeeded by: Jean Garnault

Personal details
- Born: 9 November 1934 Auxerre, France
- Died: 27 February 2024 (aged 89) Auxerre, France
- Party: UMP, LD, UFD, RI
- Education: Sciences Po, ÉNA

Jean-Pierre Soisson (French pronunciation: [ʒɑ̃ pjɛʁ swasɔ̃]; (9 November 1934 – 27 February 2024) was a French politician of the Union for a Popular Movement. He was a deputy in the National Assembly of France for the first district of Yonne for several terms between 1968 and 2012; mayor of Auxerre from 1971 to 1998; President of the Regional Council of Burgundy (1992–1993 and 1998–2004); and national minister of youth, labour, public administration and agriculture.

== Life and political career ==
Soisson was born in Auxerre. A member of the centre-right Independent Republicans and later the Union for French Democracy (UDF), he was first elected to the National Assembly in the June 1968 parliamentary election and was re-elected nine times until 2007. He first entered the government under the Presidency of his fellow party member Valéry Giscard d'Estaing when he became Secretary of State for Universities on 27 May 1974, serving that position until 12 January 1976. He was Secretary of State near the Prime Minister, in charge of Vocational Training, from the latter date until 25 August 1976 and then Secretary of State near the Minister for Quality of Life, in charge of Youth and Sports, until 29 March 1977. He was Minister of Youth, Sports and Leisure from 5 April 1978 to 13 May 1981.

After Socialist François Mitterrand's re-election as president seven years later, Soisson returned to the government, taking part in Mitterrand's so-called ouverture, i.e. inclusion of centre-right politicians in predominantly left-wing governments. He became Minister of Labor, Employment and Vocational Training on 29 June 1988, in which position he served for three years before becoming Minister of State, Minister of the Civil Service and Administrative Modernization on 17 May 1991. He remained in that position until 29 March 1992. Later in that year he became Minister of Agriculture and Rural Development on 2 October, serving until 29 March 1993.

Soisson was Mayor of Auxerre from 14 March 1971 to 5 April 1998. He was also Vice-President of the General Council of Yonne from 1 January 1983 to 27 June 1988, then Vice-President of the Regional Council of Bourgogne from the latter date until becoming president in March 1992, in which position he served until 17 April 1993. He was again President of the Regional Council of Bourgogne from 16 March 1998 to 28 March 2004, and he remained a member of the Regional Council.

However, his alliance with the National Front between 1998 and 2004 in order to keep his seat in the Regional Council of Bourgogne tarred his career, and owed him to be excluded from the Union for French Democracy (UDF), along with Charles Baur, Jacques Blanc, Charles Millon and Bernard Harang. Soisson was finally beaten in 2004 by François Patriat.

Jean-Pierre Soisson is one of the French members of the National Assembly who holds the record for longevity by the number of terms, with Jean Tiberi and Didier Julia, 10 terms and 32 years in the Assembly from 1968. In 2011, he announced that he would not contest his seat again for the legislative elections of 2012.

Soisson was appointed a Knight of the Legion of Honour in November 2016, for service during the Algerian War.

He died from cancer on 27 February 2024, at the age of 89.

== Political offices held ==
Governmental functions

Minister of Agriculture and Rural Development: 1992–1993.

Minister of State, Minister of Civil Service and Administrative Modernization: 1991–1992.

Minister of Labor, Employment and Training: 1988–1991.

Minister of Youth, Sport and Recreation: 1978–1981.

Secretary of State for Youth and Sports: 1976–1977.

Secretary of State for Vocational Training: January–August 1976.

Secretary of State for Universities: 1974–1976.

Electoral mandates

National Assembly of France

Member of the National Assembly of France for Yonne : 1968–1974 (Became secretary of State in 1974) / Reelected in 1978 but he became minister / 1981–1988 (Became minister in 1988) / Since 1993. Elected in 1968, reelected in 1973, 1978, 1981, 1986, 1988, 1993, 1997, 2002, 2007.

Regional Council

President of the Regional Council of Bourgogne: 1992–1993 (Resignation) / 1998–2004.

Vice-president of the Regional Council of Bourgogne: 1986–1992.

Regional councillor of Bourgogne: 1986–1993 (Resignation) / Since 1998. Reelected in 1992, 1998, 2004.

General Council

Vice-president of the General council of Yonne: 1983–1988.

Municipal Council

Mayor of Auxerre : 1971–1998 (Resignation). Reelected in 1977, 1983, 1989, 1995.

Municipal councillor of Auxerre: 1971–1998 (Resignation). Reelected in 1977, 1983, 1989, 1995.
