= Saint-Séverin, Paris =

Catholic church in Paris, France

Coordinates: 48°51′07.34″N 2°20′44.42″E

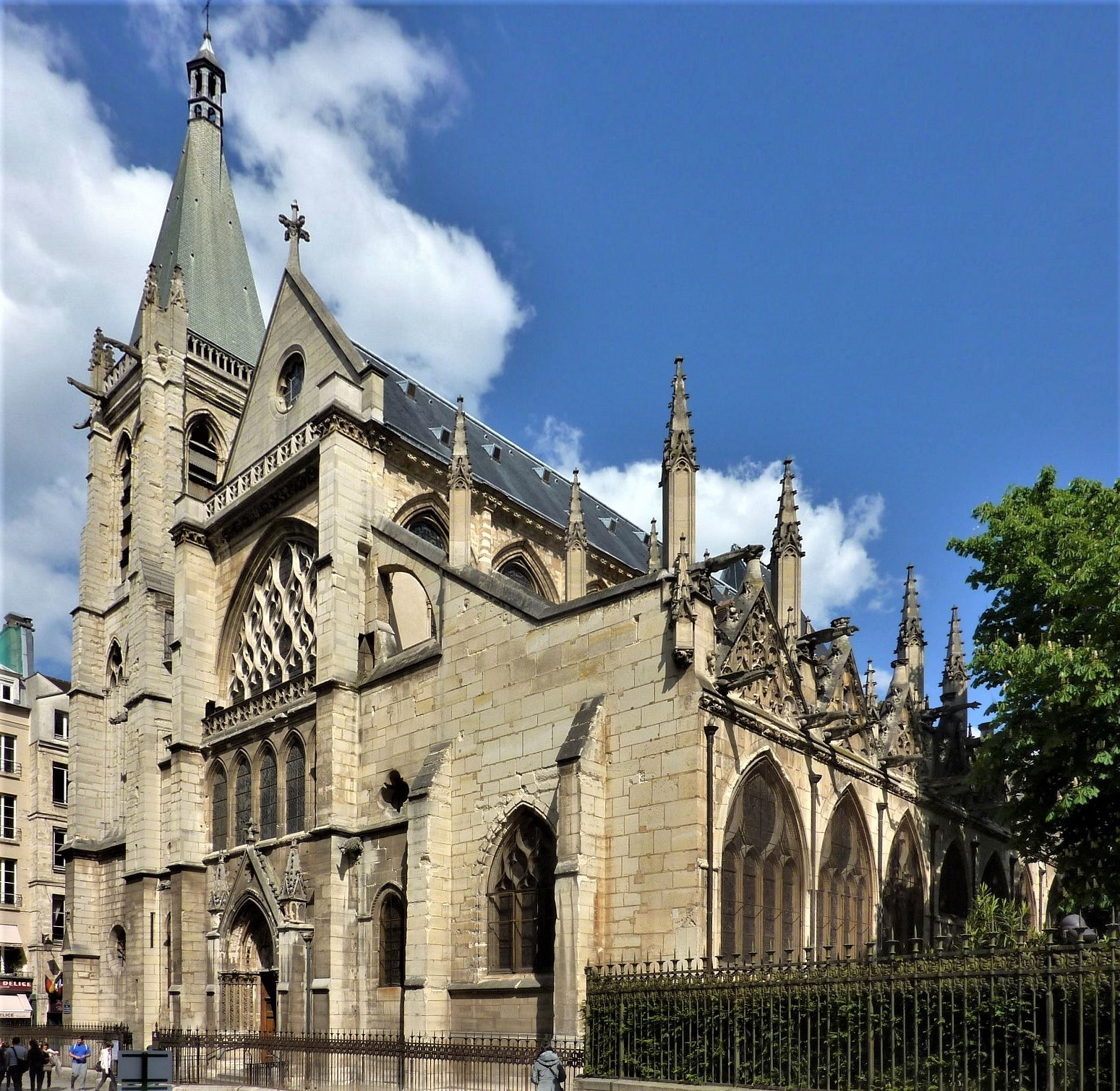
- Saint-Séverin

Religion
- Affiliation: Catholic Church
- Province: Archdiocese of Paris
- Region: Île-de-France
- Rite: Roman Rite
- Status: Active

Location
- Location: 1 Rue des Pretres-Saint-Severin (5th arr.)
- State: France
- Interactive map of Saint-Séverin, Paris

Architecture
- Type: Church
- Style: Flamboyant Gothic
- Groundbreaking: 1230; 796 years ago
- Completed: 17th century

Website
- www.saint-severin.org

The Church of Saint-Séverin (French: Église Saint-Séverin, pronounced [eɡliz sɛ̃ sevʁɛ̃]) is a Catholic church in the 5th arrondissement, or Latin Quarter, of Paris, on the lively tourist street Rue Saint-Séverin. It was constructed beginning in 1230, then, after a fire, rebuilt and enlarged in the 15th to 17th centuries in the Flamboyant Gothic style. It was the parish church for students at the University of Paris, and is one of the oldest churches that remains standing on the Left Bank.

== History ==
The church took its name from Saint Séverin of Paris, a devout hermit who lived at the site in the 6th century, and died in about 540. One of his pupils was Clodoald or Saint Cloud, a Merovingian prince who quit the royal family to himself become a monk and hermit, who also later became a Saint. After the death of Severin, a chapel was erected on the site of his cell, believed to be near the oratory of Saint Martin in the present church. This chapel was destroyed during the Norman invasions in the 9th century, then rebuilt in the Romanesque style in the 11th century. Several Sarcophogi from a cemetery of the Merovingian dynasty were discovered during rebuilding on the site in the 19th century.

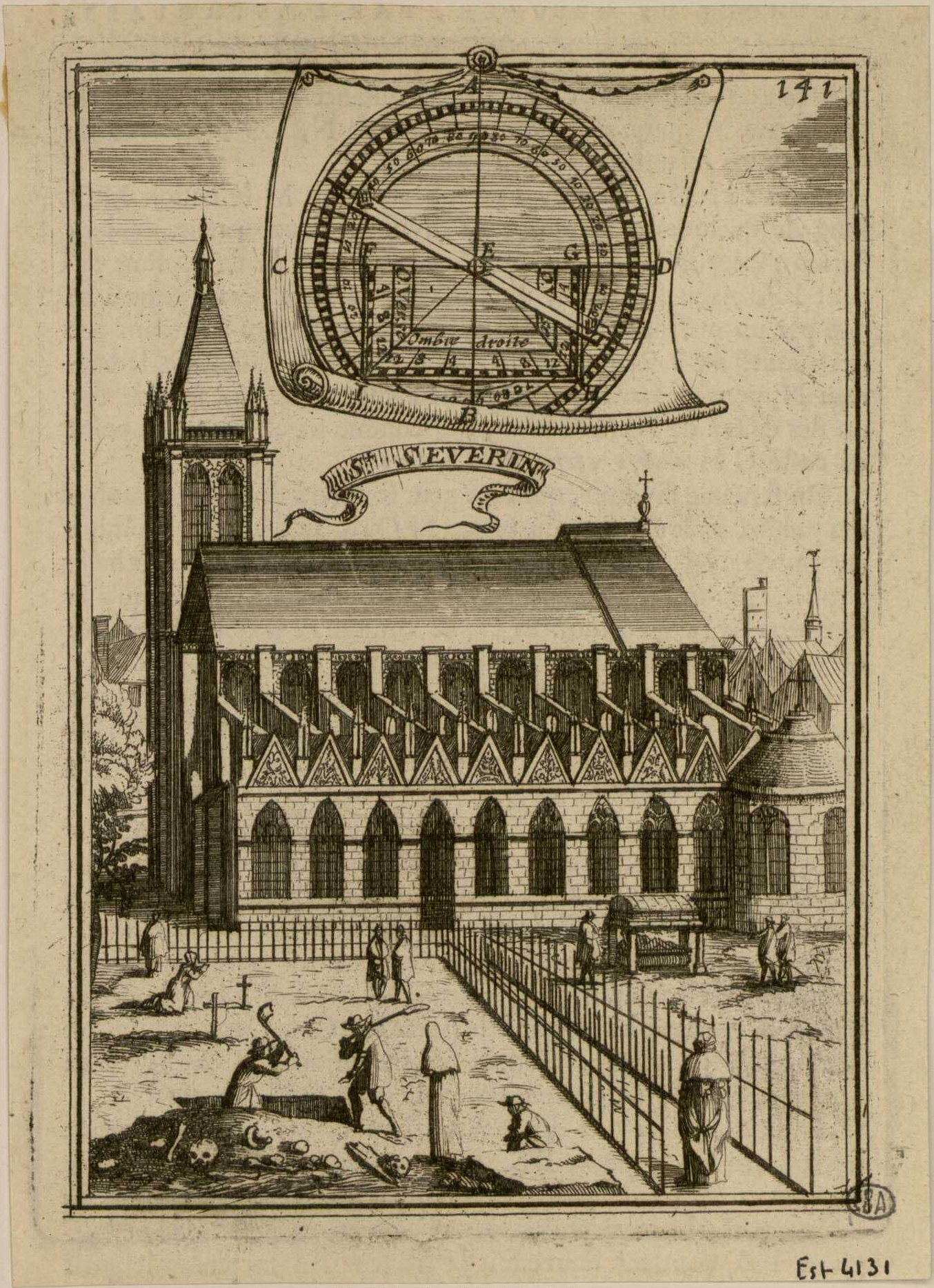
The church in 1702

At the end of the 12th century, due to the popularity and growing size of the theology school attached to the cathedral of Notre Dame de Paris, the students and teachers were relocated to the Left Bank. The University of Paris was founded in 1215, and Saint Severin became its parish church. The fame of the university and its teachers attracted students and scholars from across Europe, and a larger church was required. Beginning in about 1230, construction began on a new building in the High Gothic style. The church was contemporary with Notre Dame de Paris and Sainte-Chapelle. An additional aisle on the south side was built in the early 14th century.

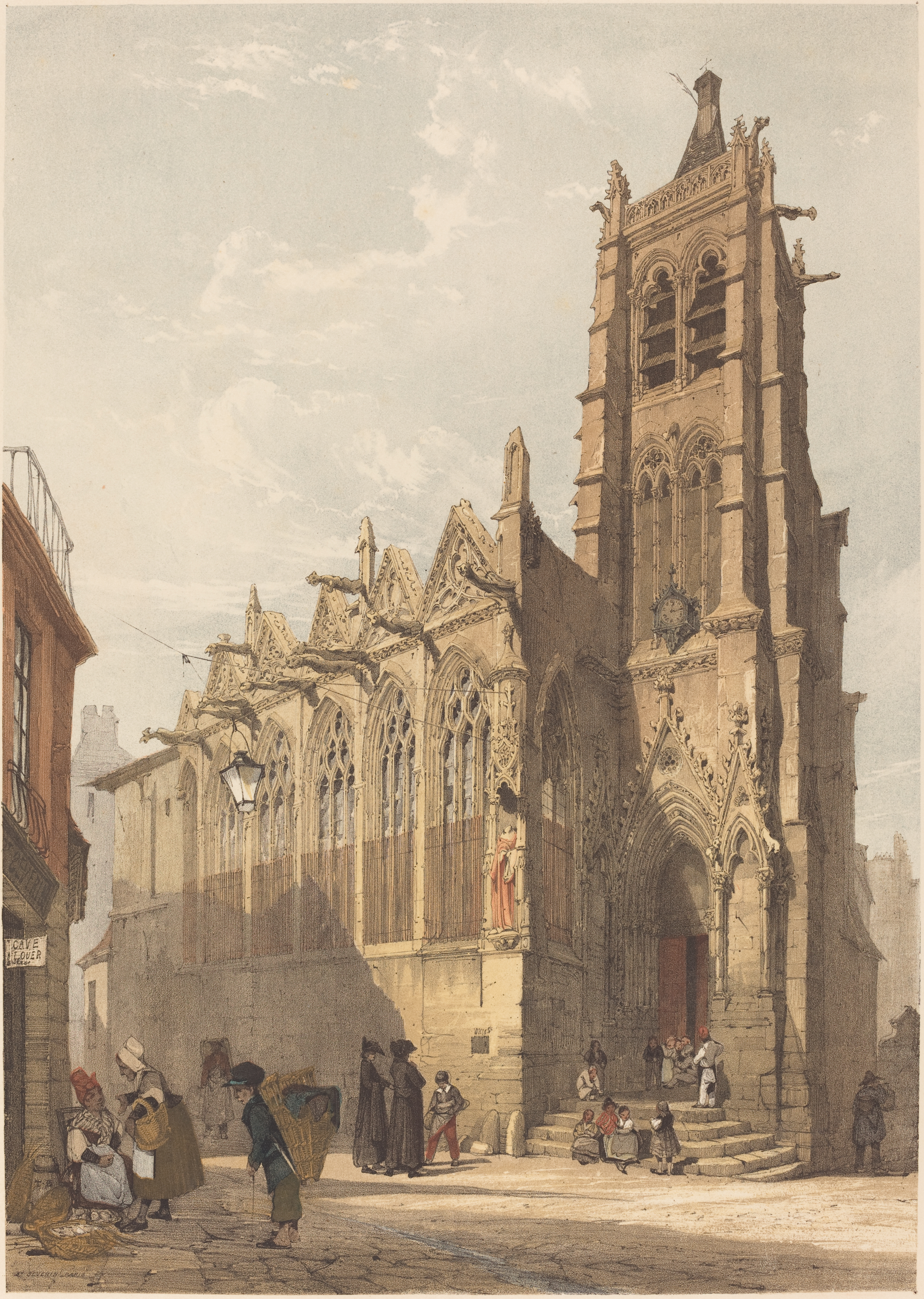
Engraving by Thomas Shotter Boys, St. Séverin, Paris, 1839

The church was seriously damaged by fire in 1448 during the Hundred Years' War. The archpriest Guillaume d'Estouteville began rebuilding the church in the more ornamental Flamboyant Gothic style. A new aisle was added on the north side, and, in 1489, a semi-circular apse and ambulatory was added at the eastern end, with dramatic Flamboyant columns, arches, and vaults, around a dramatic spiral central pillar. A circle of radiating chapels was added around the apse, and new chapels built along the outer aisles between the buttresses. As the church grew, the surrounding neighbourhood pressed against it. The 13th-century bell tower, originally on the exterior, and still the original work up to the level of the balustrade, was surrounded by the expanded church, as was the ancient "Charnier", or Charnel House, a mausoleum. The old cemetery is now a garden.

After its completion in 1520 the church took on the general appearance it still has today. In 1643 a second sacristy was added, and in 1673 the royal architect Jules Hardouin-Mansart built the communion chapel on the church's southeast corner. In 1684 the decorator Charles le Brun modified the design of the choir, removing the rood screen and providing the apse columns with marble facing.

During the French Revolution the church was closed and turned into a storehouse for gunpowder, and later a storehouse for grain and for church bells, which during the period were often melted down to make cannon. It was returned to the Catholic Church in 1803, but, like other Paris churches, the building is still owned by the French State, with exclusive use granted to the Catholic Church.

In the 20th century future French President François Mitterrand and Danielle Gouze were married in the church on October 28, 1944, not long after the liberation of Paris from the Germans.

== Exterior ==
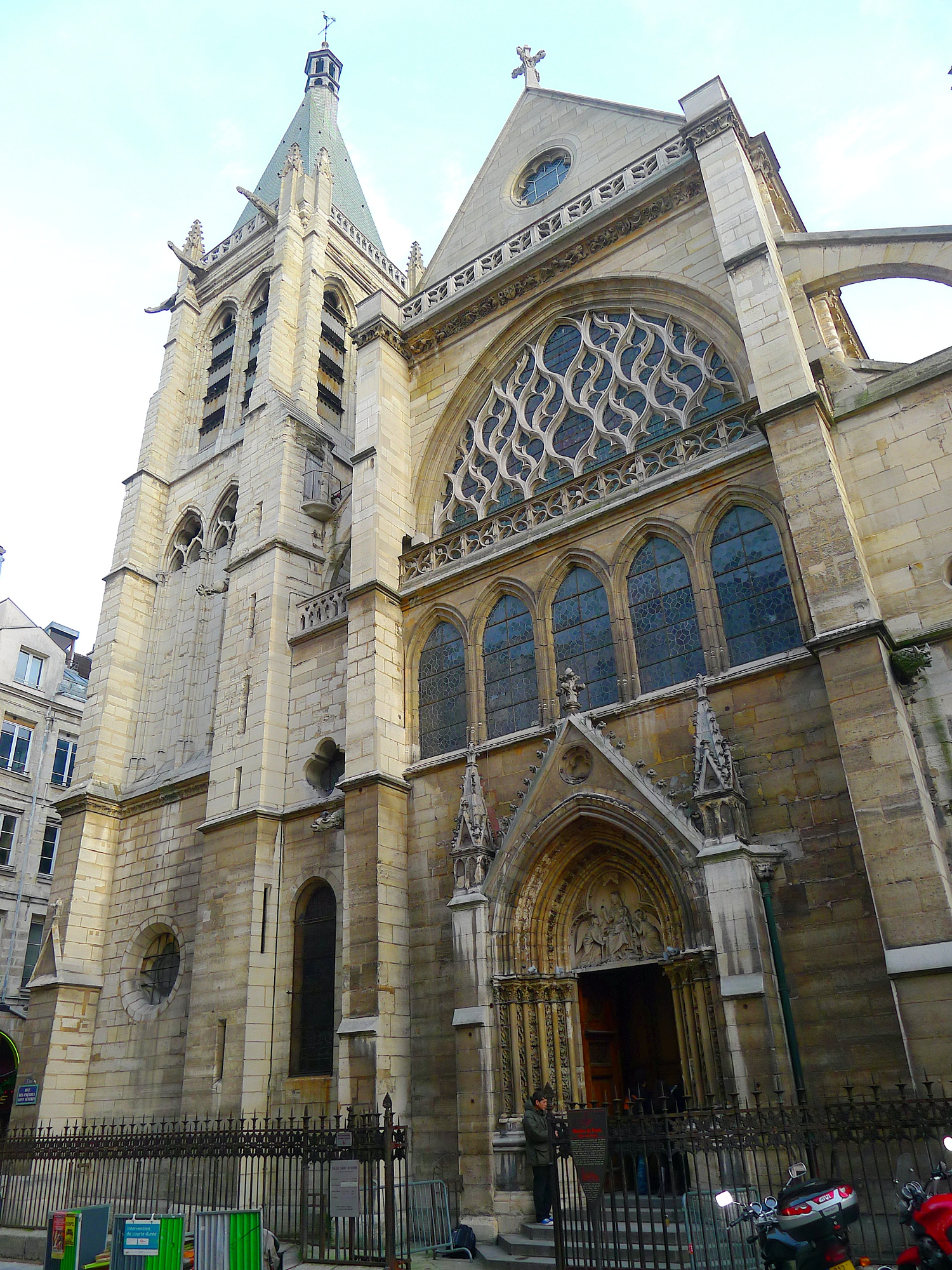
The west front. The portal comes from an earlier church

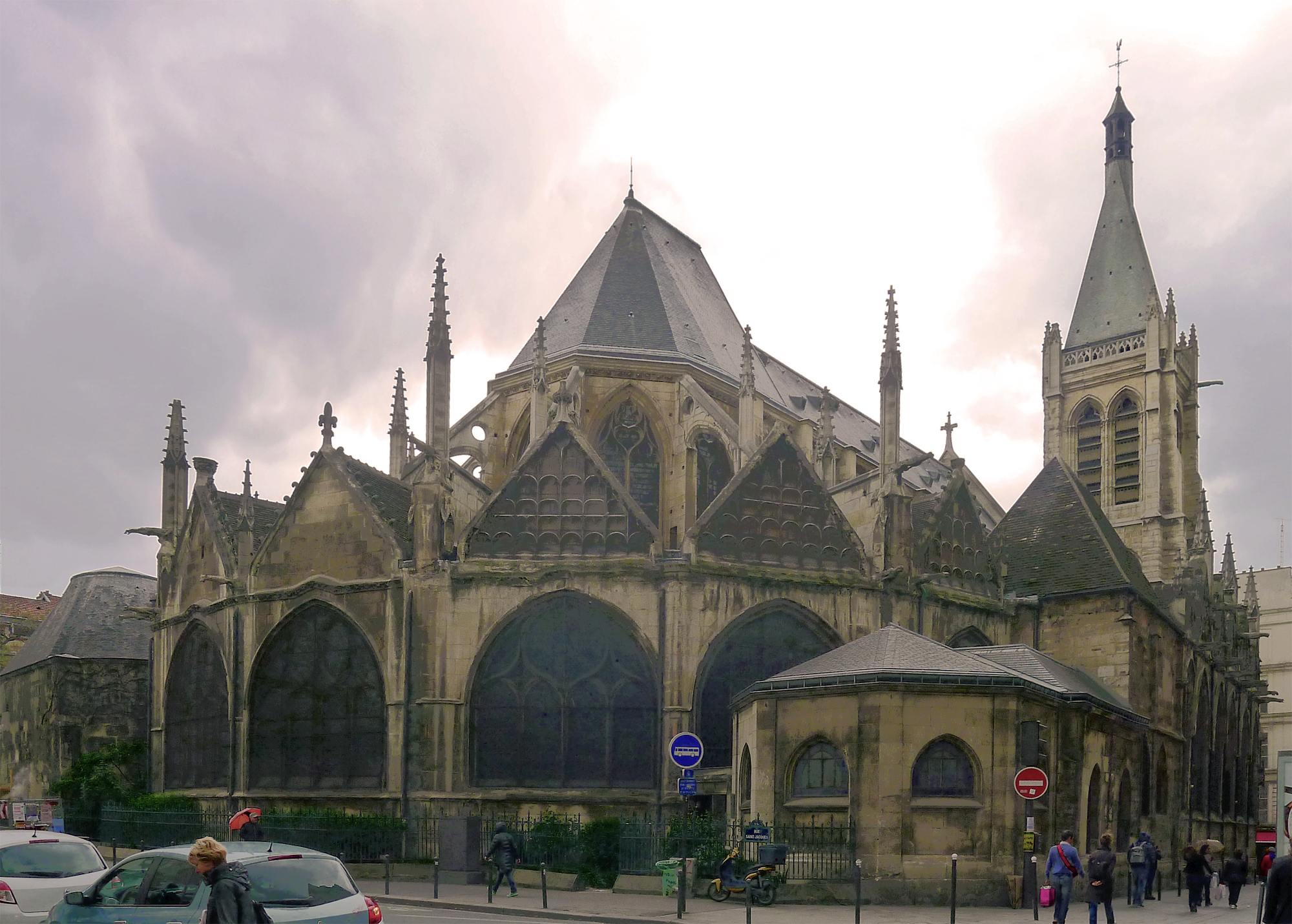
The apse seen from Rue Saint-Jacques

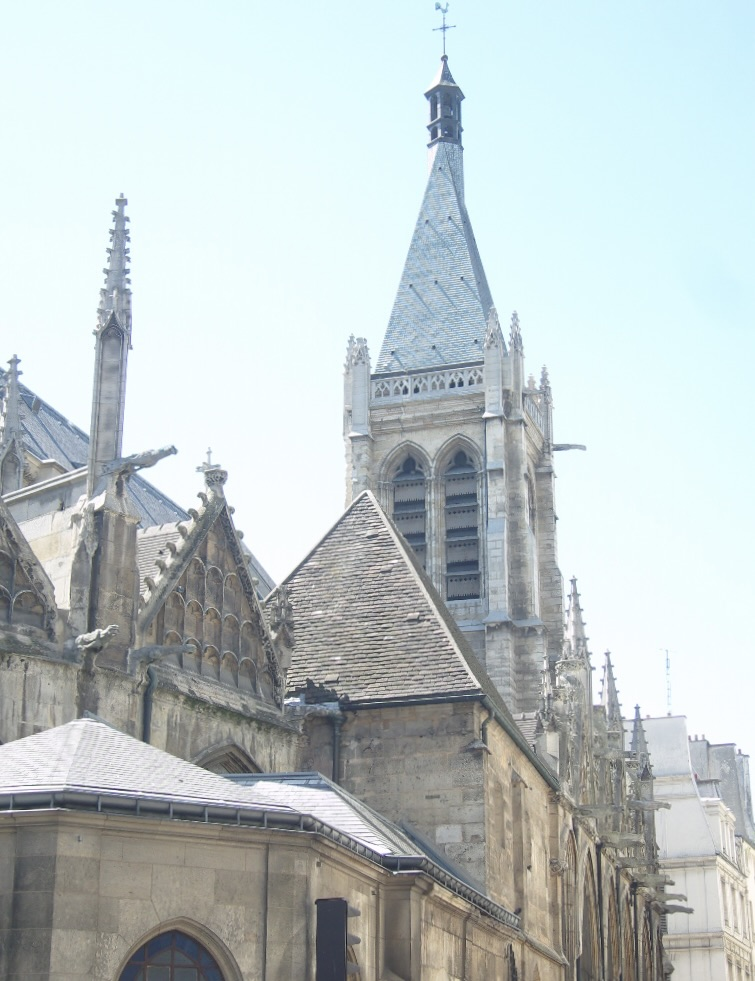
The bell tower (portion below balustrade from 13th century)

The west façade showing the main portal and the Gothic bell tower.

The lower portions of the bell tower, up to the balustrade, were part of the original 13th-century church; the tower itself was originally separate from the church building. It was completed in 1487.

The lower portion of the west portal, next to the bell tower, was originally part of an entirely different church, Saint-Pierre-aux-Bœufs, originally close to Notre-Dame de Paris, which was demolished in the 1830s to open space around the cathedral.

The bells include the oldest one remaining in Paris, cast in 1412.

=== The Cloister and Garden ===
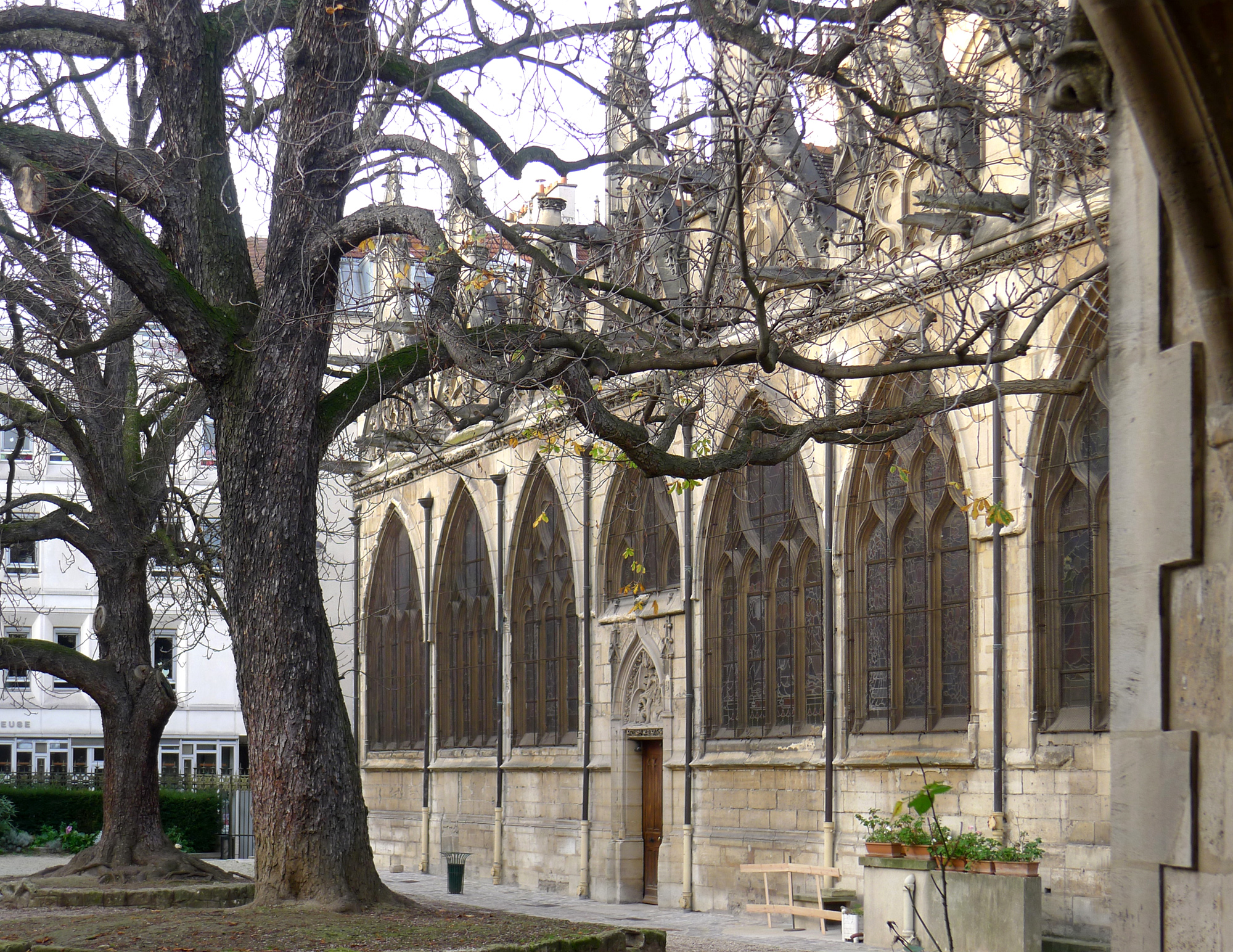
South front, facing the cloister and garden

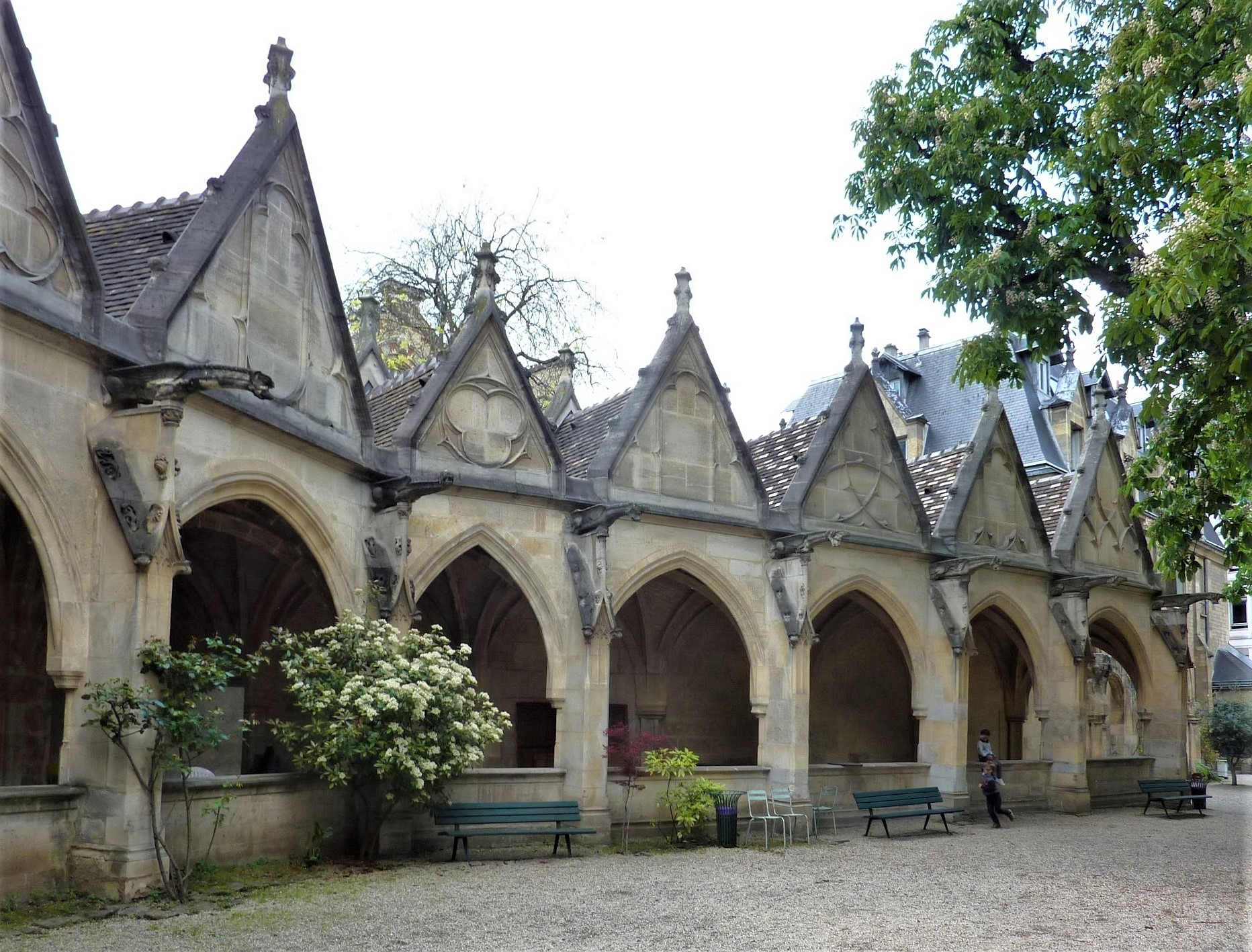
Cloister, former Ossuary or Charnel House (15th c.)

On the south side of the church is the former charnel house, built in the 15th century, the only still existing in Paris. It was above-ground mausoleum, where tombs filled the chapels and surrounded a small cemetery, now a garden.

== Interior ==
=== The Nave ===
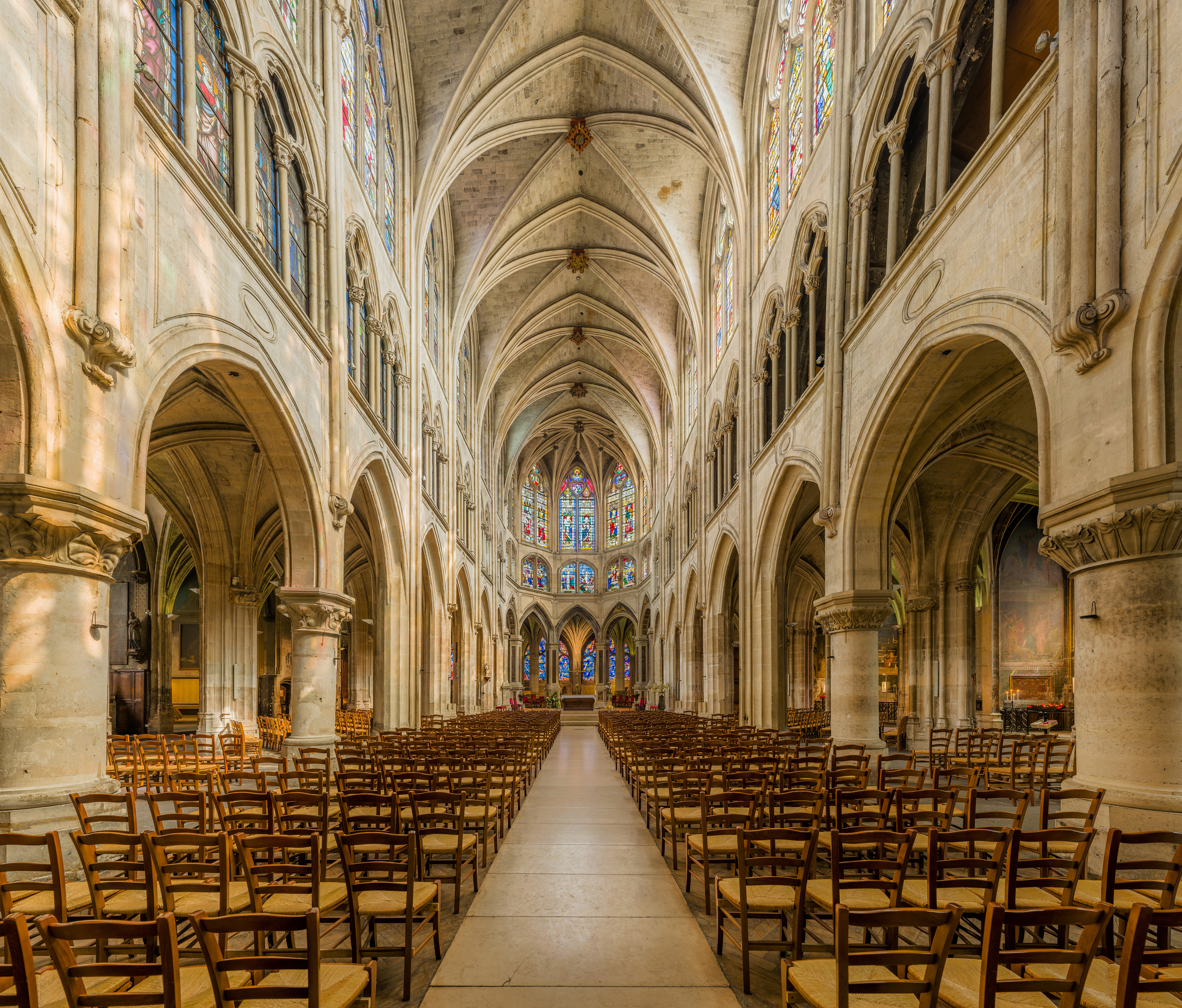
The nave, facing the choir and apse

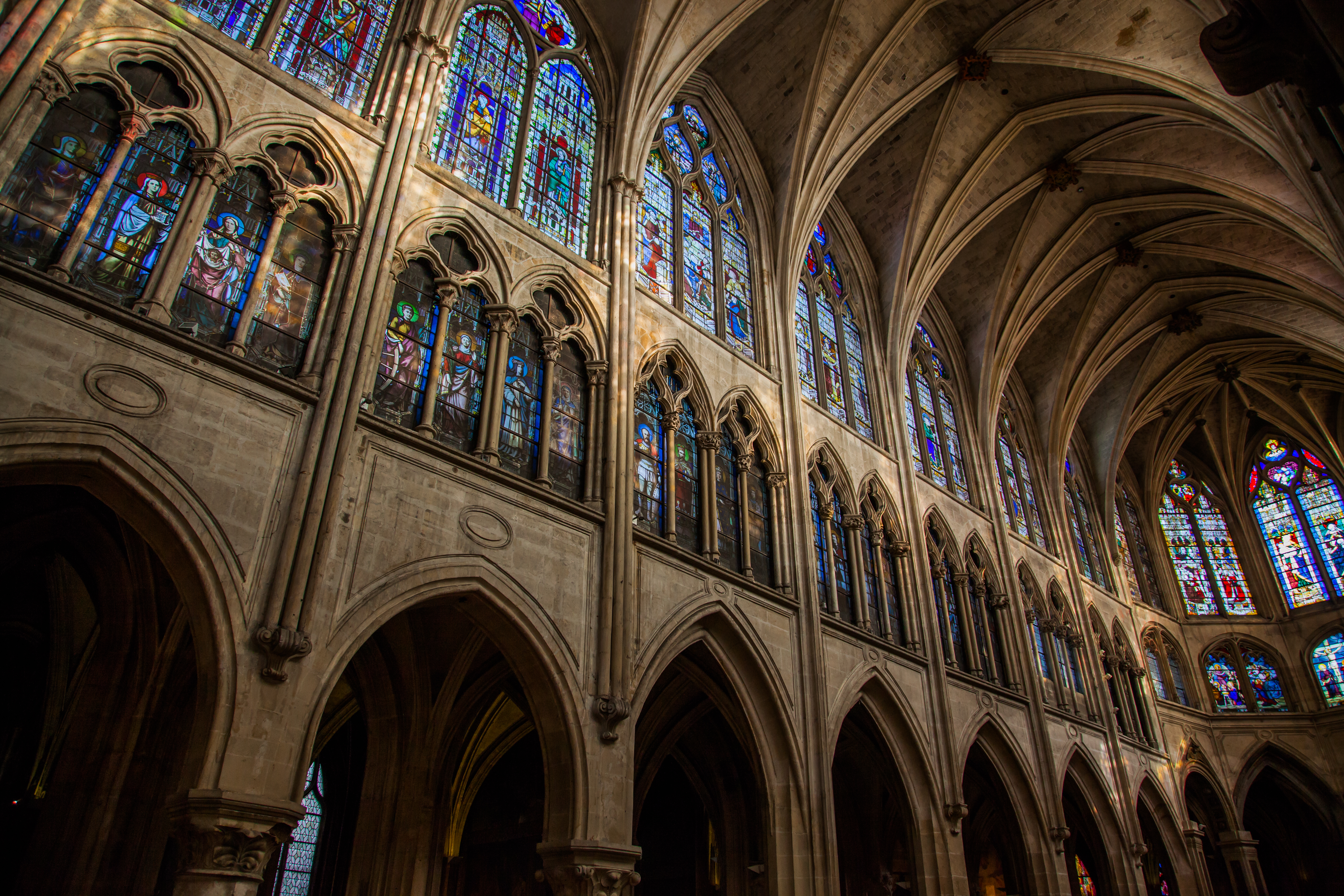
Upper windows of the nave and choir

The nave of the church, at the west end where the congregation is seated, was built in two distinctly different eras and styles. At the west end, near the entrance, the first three traverses are in the High Gothic style of the 13th century. They feature massive cylindrical pillars whose capitals have floral decoration, particularly water lilies, and support rounded arches. Cul-des-lampes, or brackets on the pillars receive the thinner colonettes which descend from the ribs of the vaults above. These date from the end of the 14th century. The upper walls between the ribs are filled with deeply-coloured stained glass windows from the end of the 14th century, which illustrate the lives of the Apostles.

The columns in the four traverses closer to the apse were built later, in the 15th century, in the more Flamboyant style. They are more slender, form pointed arches, and are closer together, in the Flamboyant style.

=== The Choir, Apse and Disambulatory ===
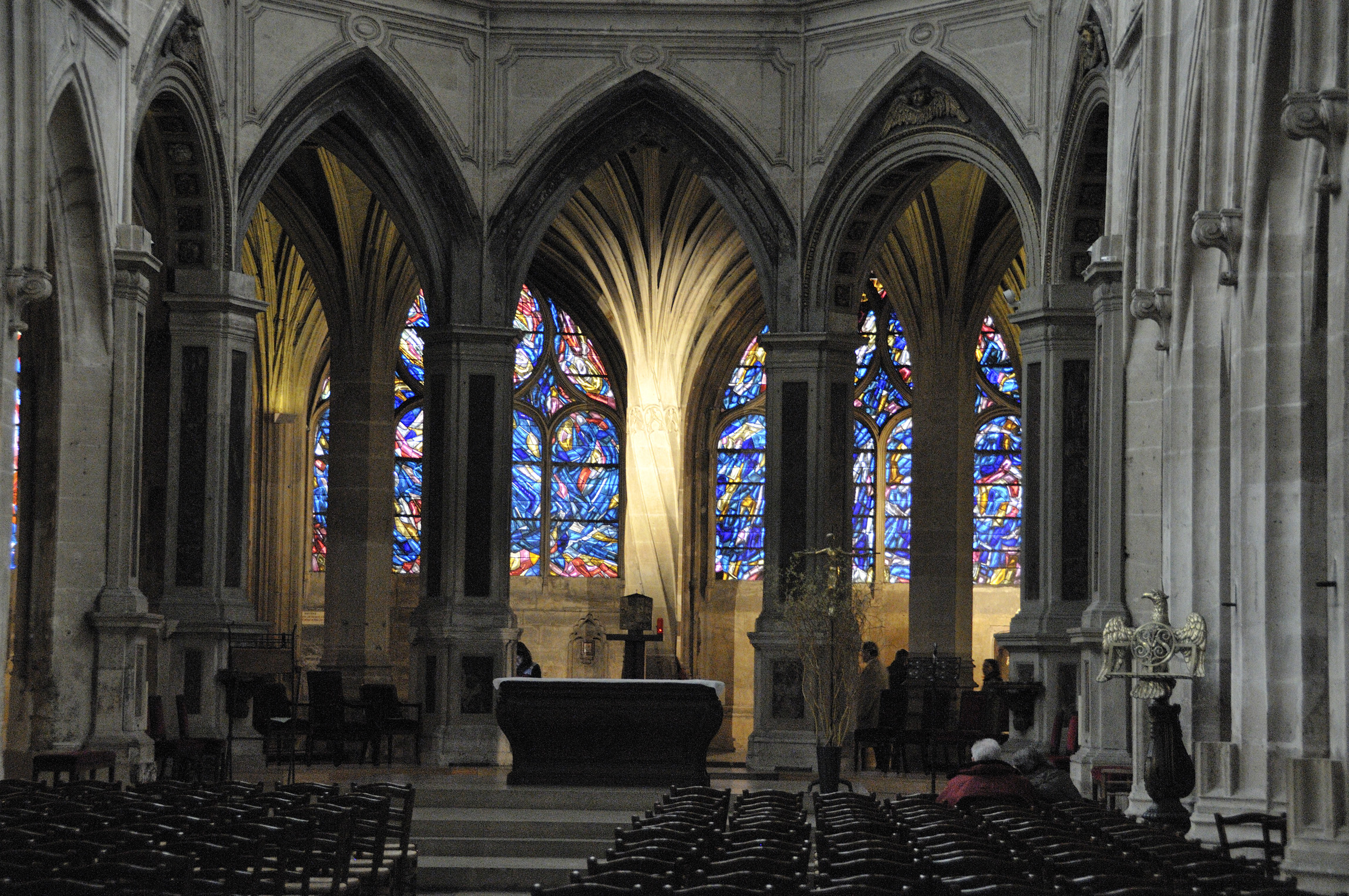
The choir

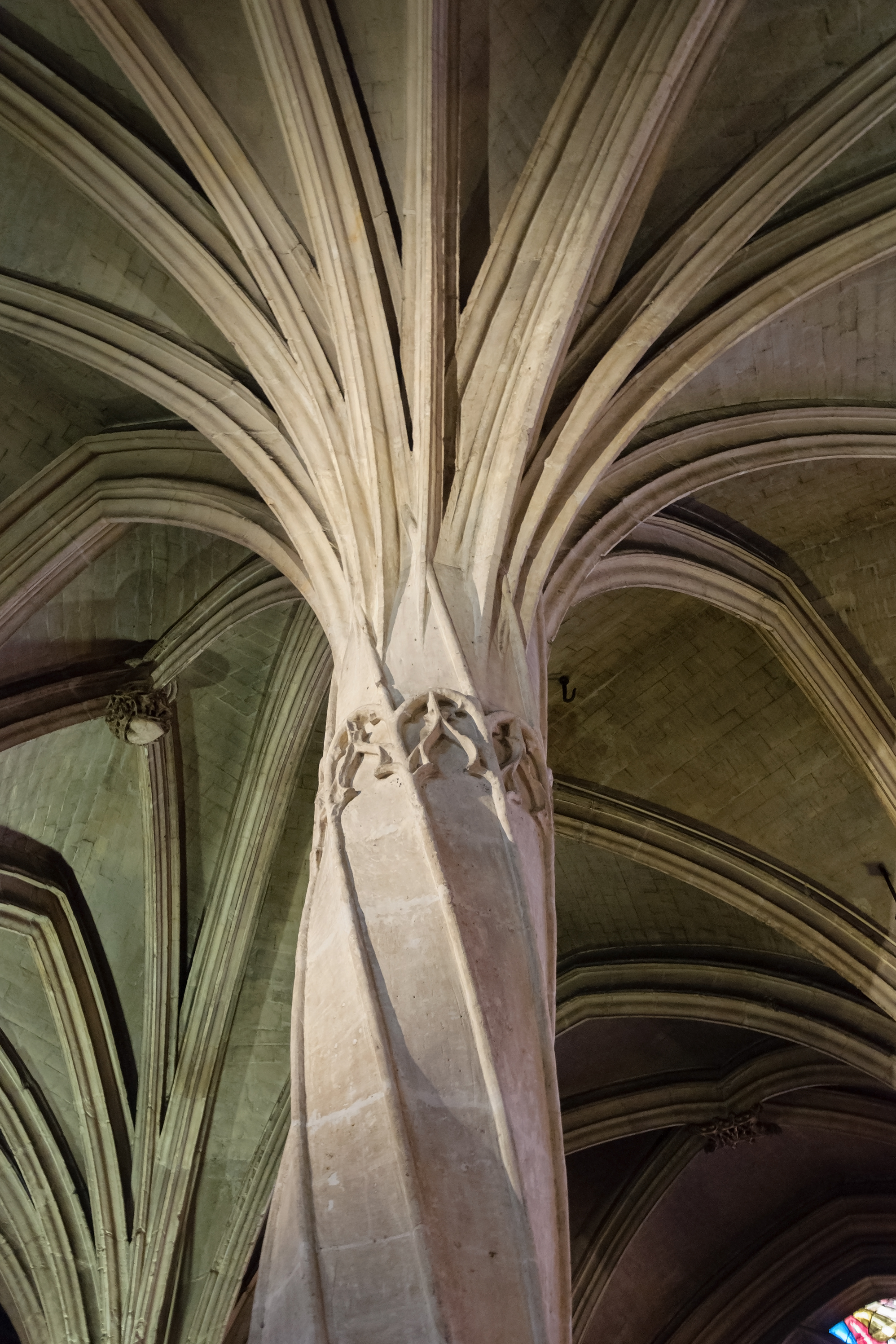
The twisting column in the disambulatory

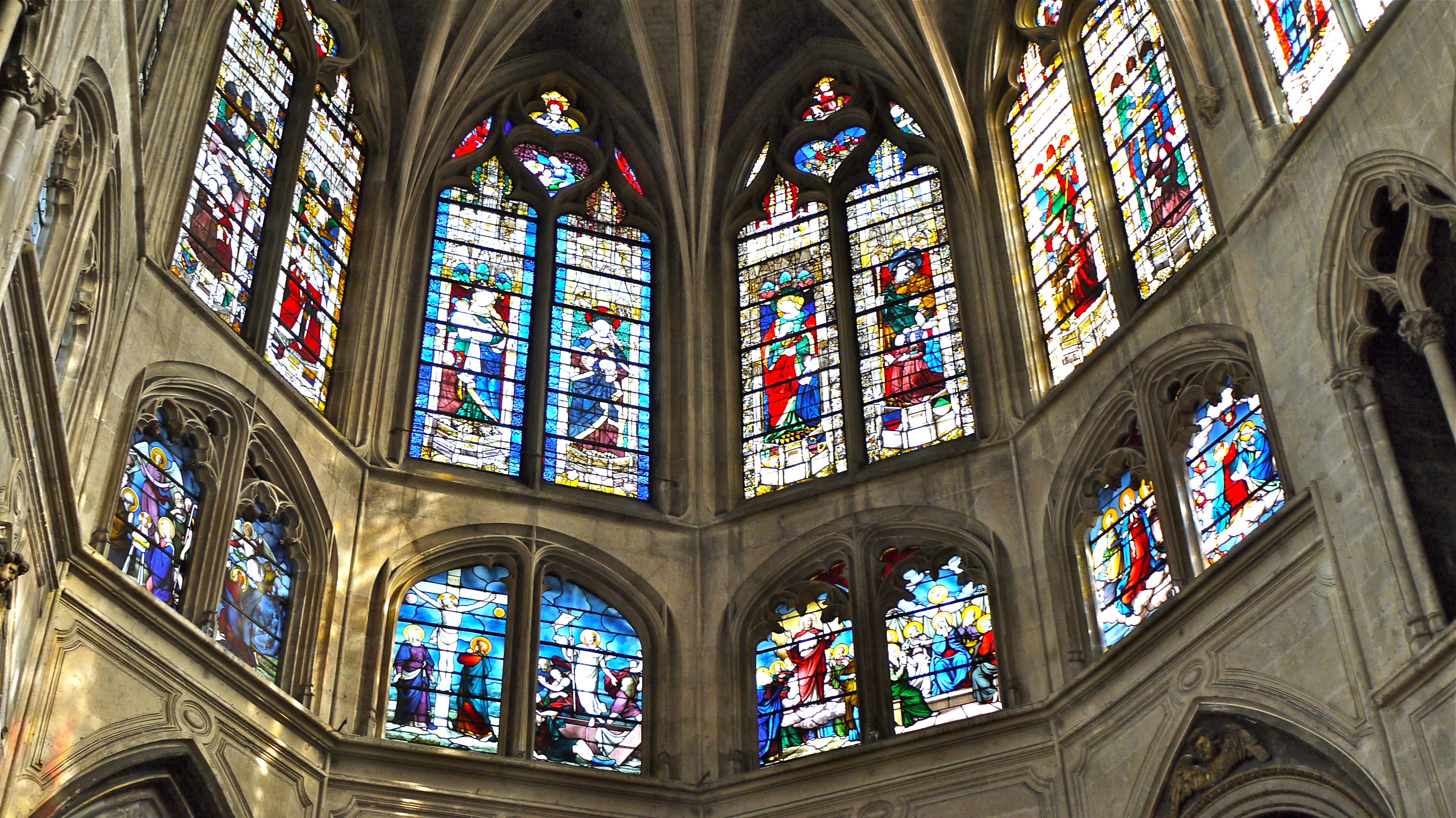
Upper windows of the apse; portraits of the Saints

The choir was constructed in the 15th century in the Flamboyant style. It has the form of a half-circle, surrounded by an arcade of pointed arches, and covered with flamboyant rib vaults with highly decorated crisscrossing compartments. The classical decoration was added in the late 17th century by Jean-Baptiste Tuby (1635-1700), using the designs of Charles Le Brun (1619-1690), the royal architect. The high altar was removed following the reforms of the Second Vatican Council, replaced only by a simplistic table.

The apse behind the altar has a double disambulatory, or semicircular walkway, which was completed at the end of the 15th century. It has the most celebrated architectural features of the church; the twisting central pillar and surrounding pillars resemble stone palm trees, whose branches reach upward and spread out into the intricate web of the flamboyant vaults. The central pillar is illuminated, and is visible from all parts of the church.

The batistry is in this unusual location, due to the presence of the original baptistry, a natural spring, outside the windows.

The construction of the marble choir was made possible by donations from Anne, Duchess of Montpensier, a cousin of Louis XIV.

== Art and decoration ==
=== Stained glass ===
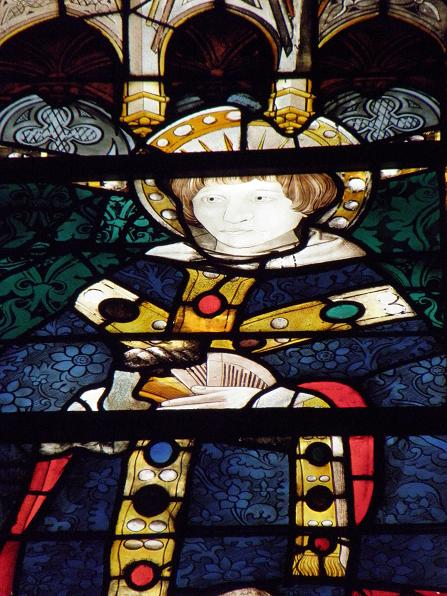
Window of Saint Severin (15th–16th c.) (window 102)

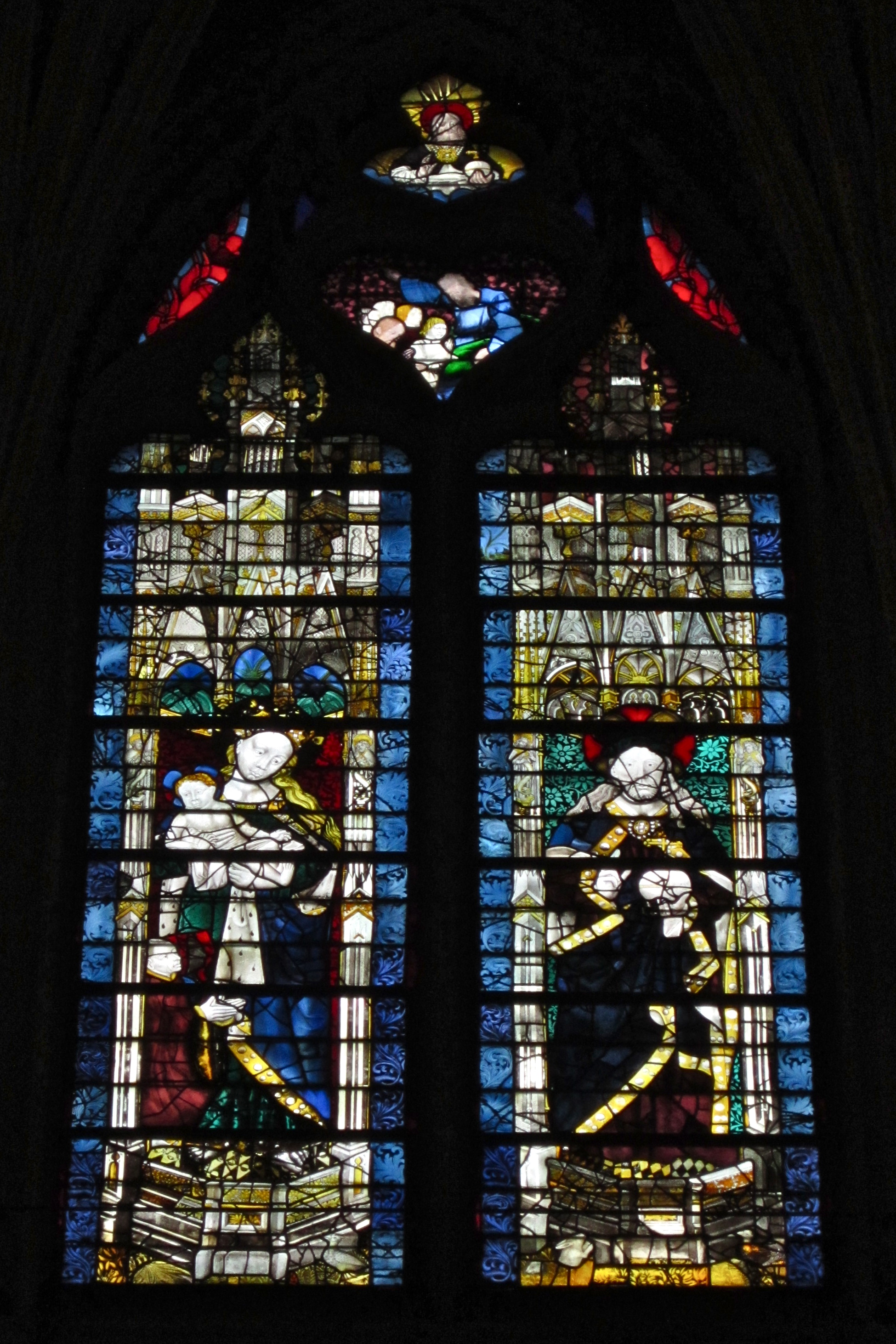
Window in the choir (15th century)

The oldest stained-glass windows, dating to about 1378, are three pairs of bay windows, each with two lancets, which are found near the apse. They were originally intended for another church, the chapel of the college of Beauvais.

A large part of the stained glass dates to the second part of the 15th century. This includes the rose window on the west front from 1482, which portrays a Tree of Jesse, depicting the genealogy of Christ. Much of this window is hidden by the case of the organ, installed in the 18th century.

Beneath the vaults of the choir, the windows in the three central bays were installed in their present location in the 16th century. These windows were probably part of the original Gothic chevet of 1450. From left to right, they depict Saint John the Baptist, Saint Michael, the Virgin and Child, Christ Carrying the World, Saint John the Evangelist, and Saint Martin of Tours. The windows of the upper bays of the nave are also from the 15th century. Saint Severin, the patron of the church, is represented there. At the bottom of the window is a portrait of the donors who gave the window.

The Gothic windows of the north front depict The Ascension of Christ (left), Saint Peter with the Key (center) and Saint John the Baptist, with a lamb, with portraits of the donors. The third window depicts the Trinity, with God in the center, presented as a King, with Christ before him, and a dove representing the Holy Spirit. Two additional windows depict angels carrying candles.

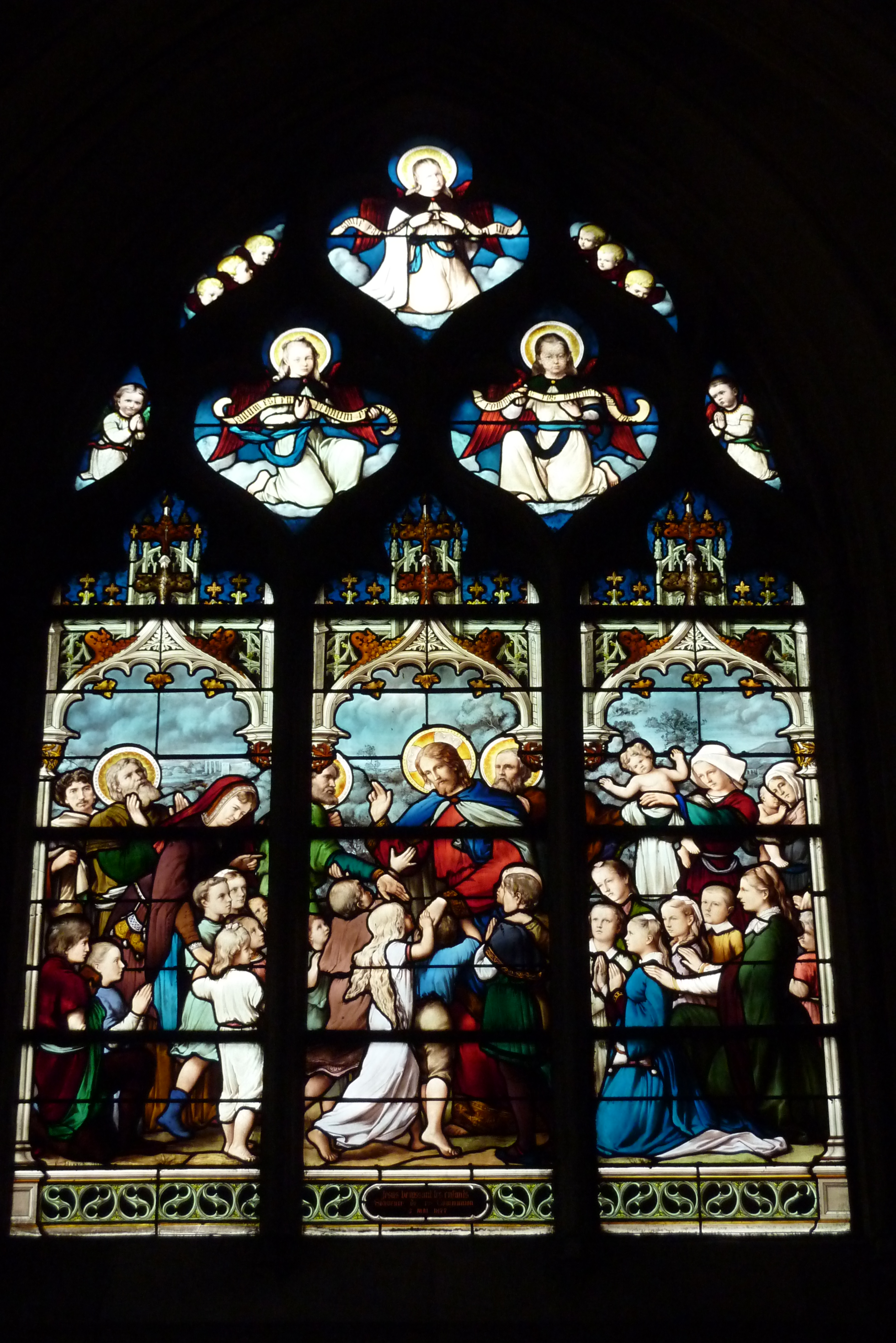
"Christ Blessing the Children" (19th century), donated by Charles Garner

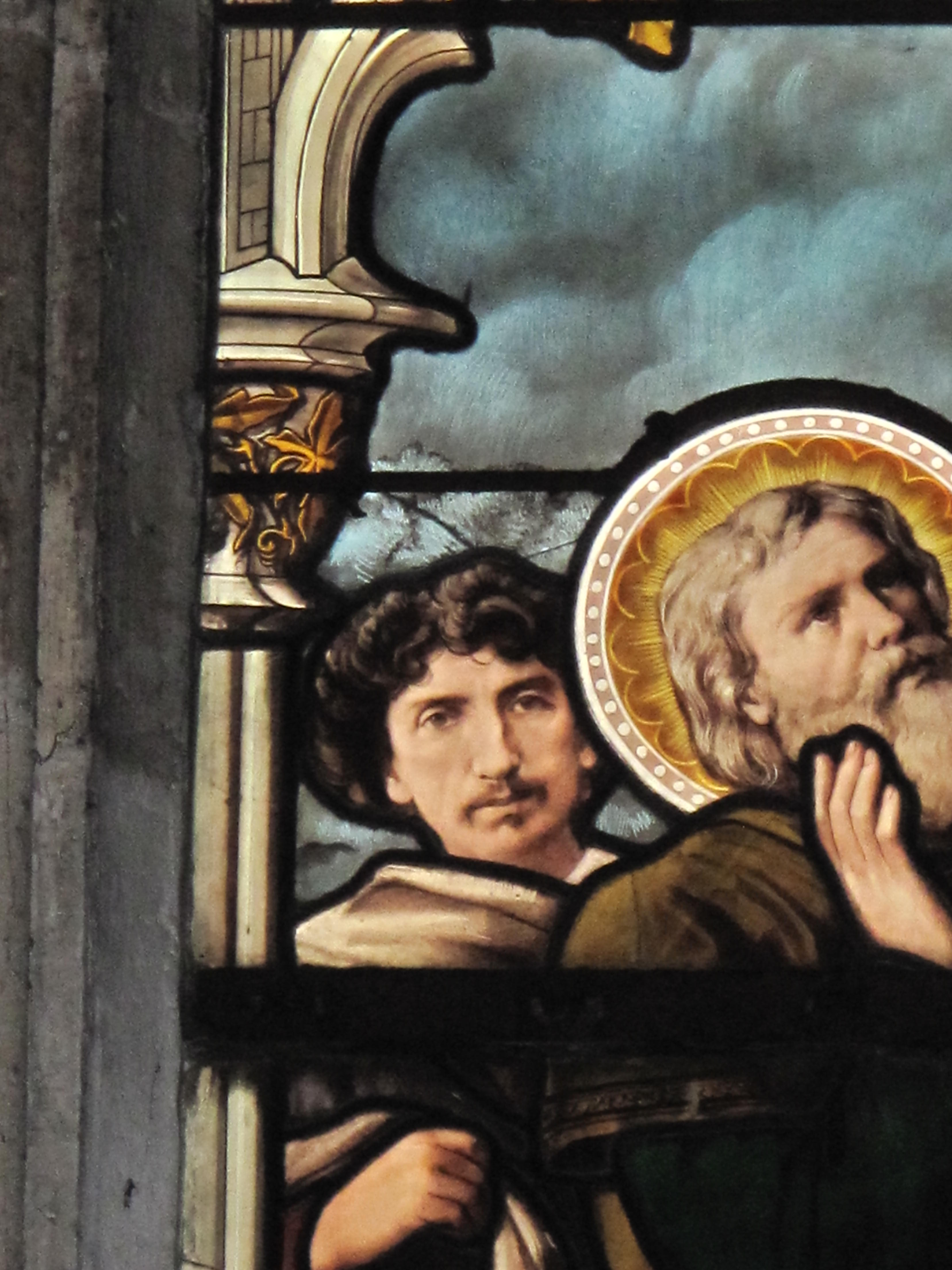
Portrait of architect Charles Garnier, patron of the window

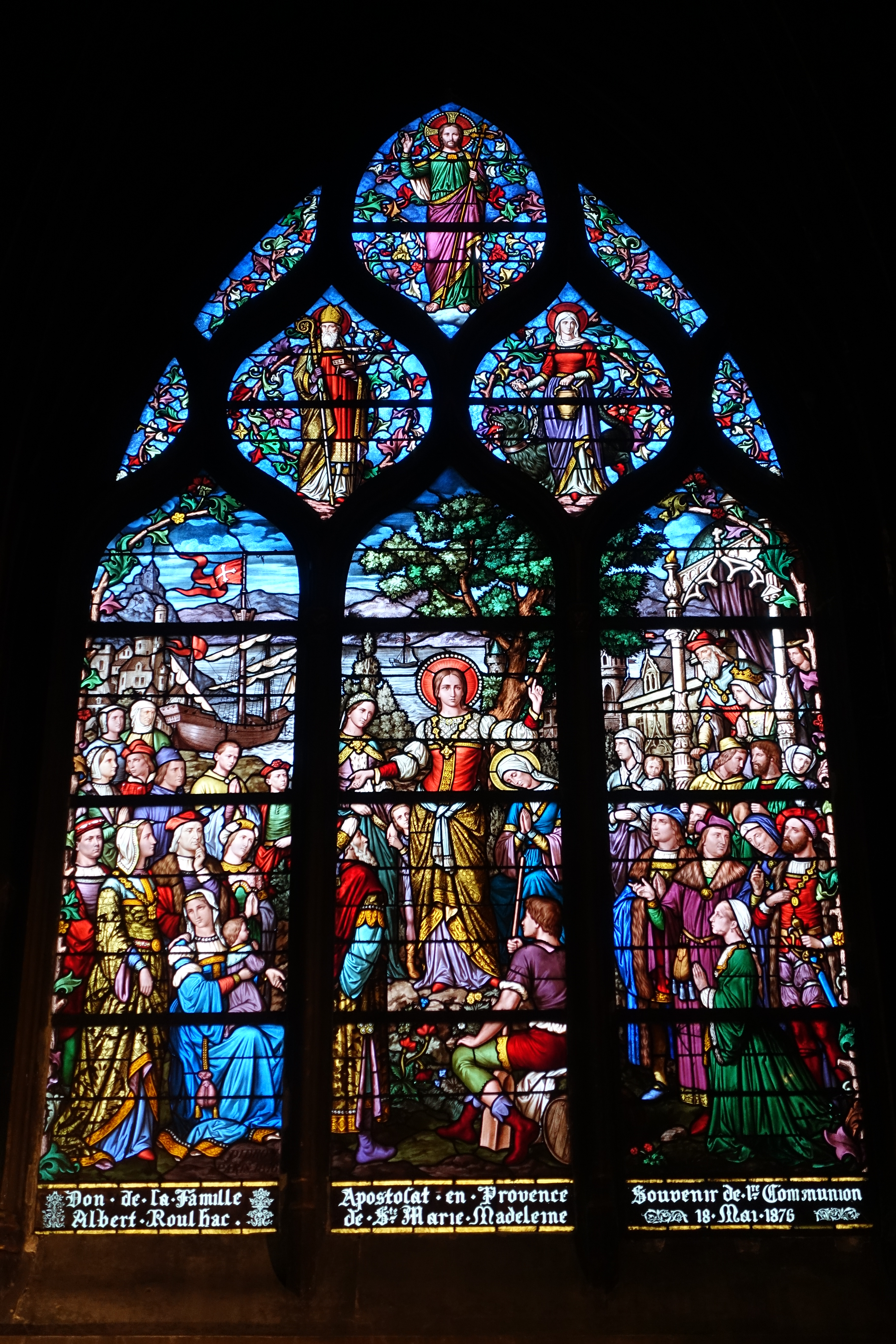
Saint Mary-Madeline (1876)

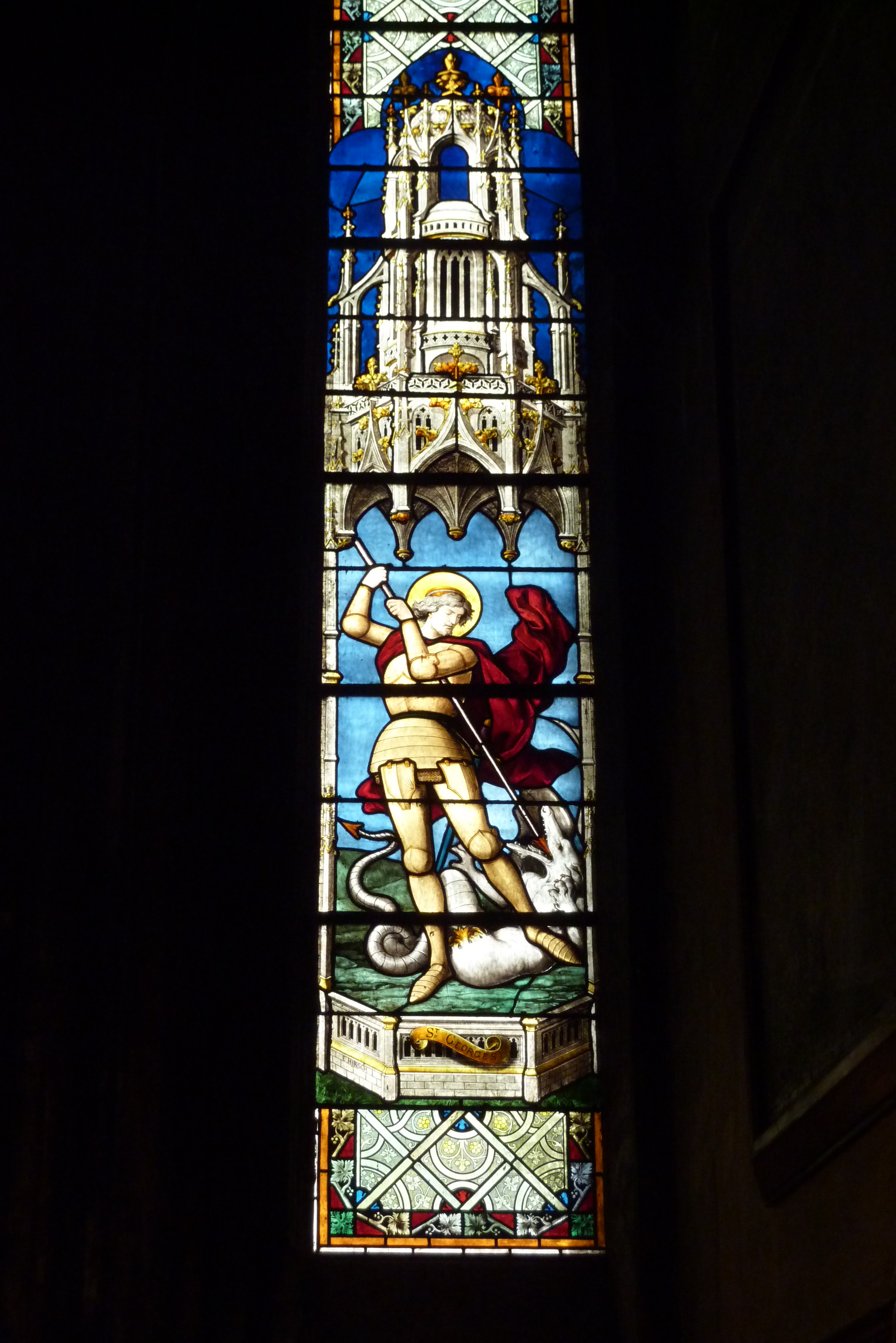
St. George and the Dragon, by Émile Hirsch (19th c.)

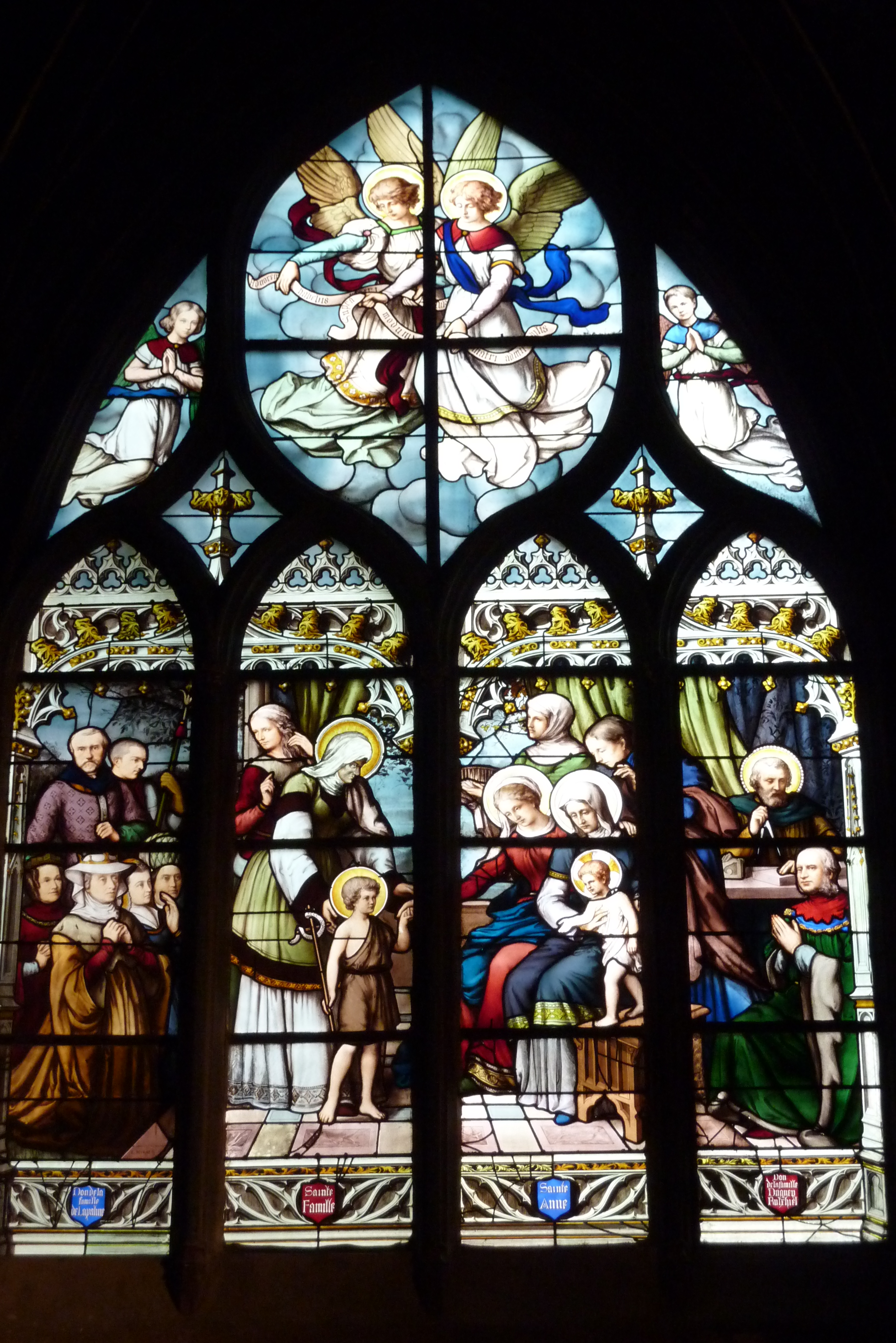
St. John the Baptist presented to the Virgin Mary and infant Christ, window design by Enile Hirsch (19th c.)

A large portion of the stained glass was added in the 19th century. Most of the windows were based on drawings by Émile Hirsch. This includes the windows on the ground floor, a well as those in the openings on the north side, which were installed beginning in 1848. The donors included Charles Garnier, architect of the Paris Opera, and his wife, who funded the windows "Christ blessing the children" on the west front. The donors are portrayed in the corner of the window.

The windows of the chapel of Saint Vincent-de-Paul and of Saint-Francois-de-Sales, on the north side, are from this period, and represent both scenes of that quarter of Paris, and biblical scenes chosen by the donors. In the intermediate level, the windows of the triforium depict a gallery of saints. In the choir, the main theme is "Mysteries of the Life of Christ."

The disambulatory is decorated with a group of eight modern stained glass windows, made by Jean René Bazaine between 1964 and 1970. They are inspired by the seven sacraments of the Catholic church. The artist explained that the abstract windows were designed "not as decoration but means to make the non-visible appear." The dominant colours are blue and red, particularly in the centre, near the baptistry, where the colors represent water and fire.

=== Art and sculpture ===
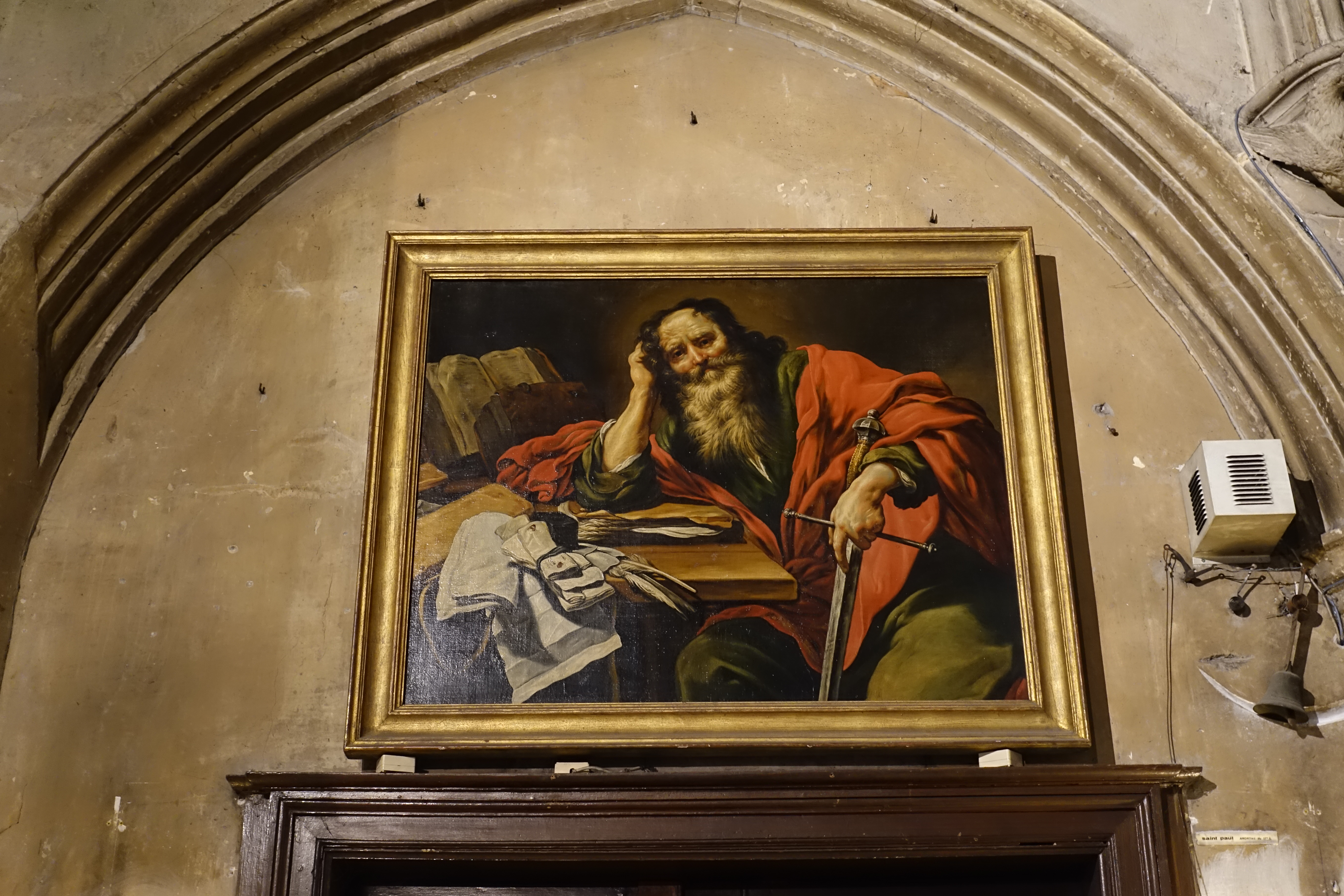
Saint Paul, by Claude Vignon (17th century)

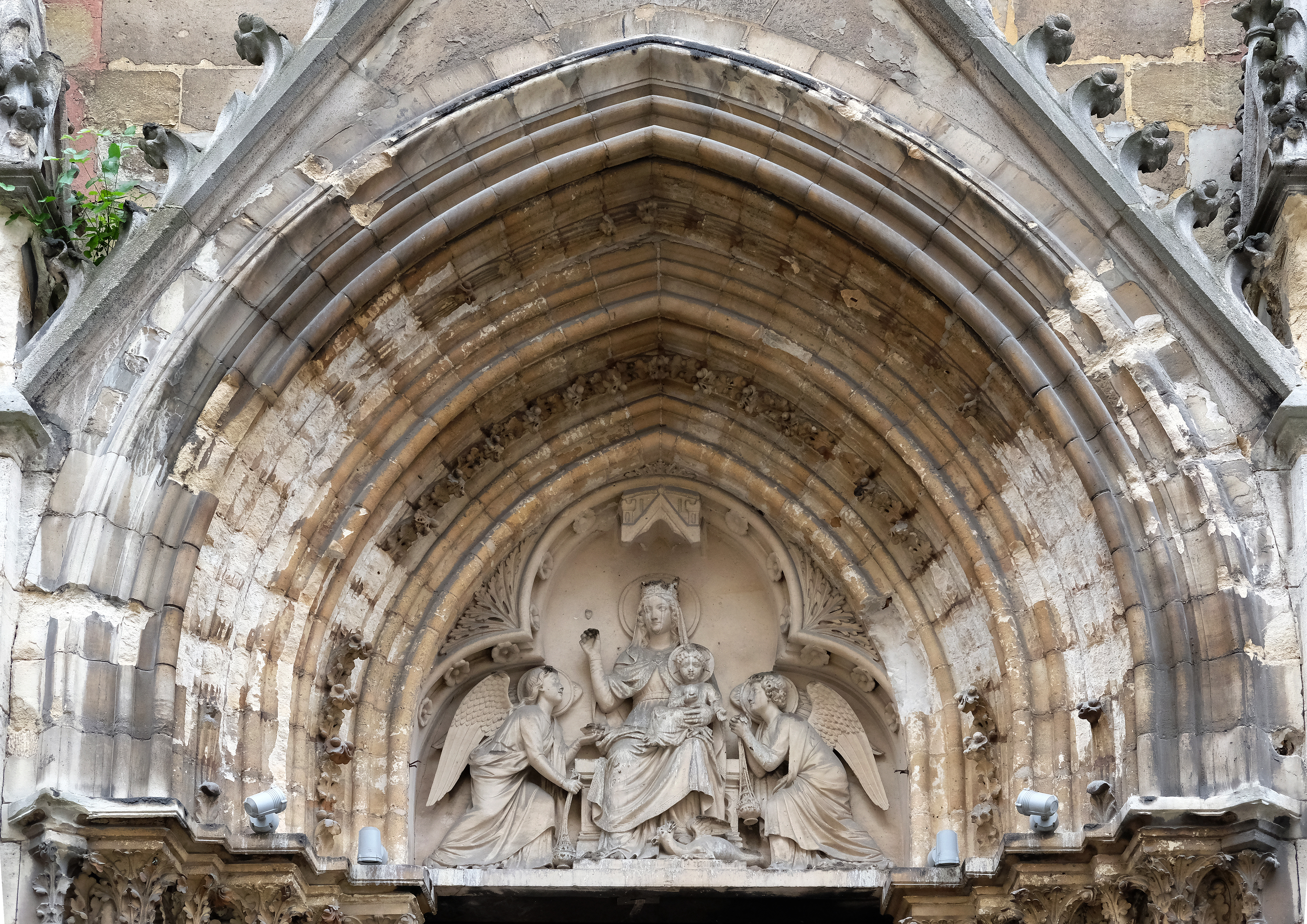
Detail of the west portal sculpture

Pillar in the shape of a palm tree in St Séverin church
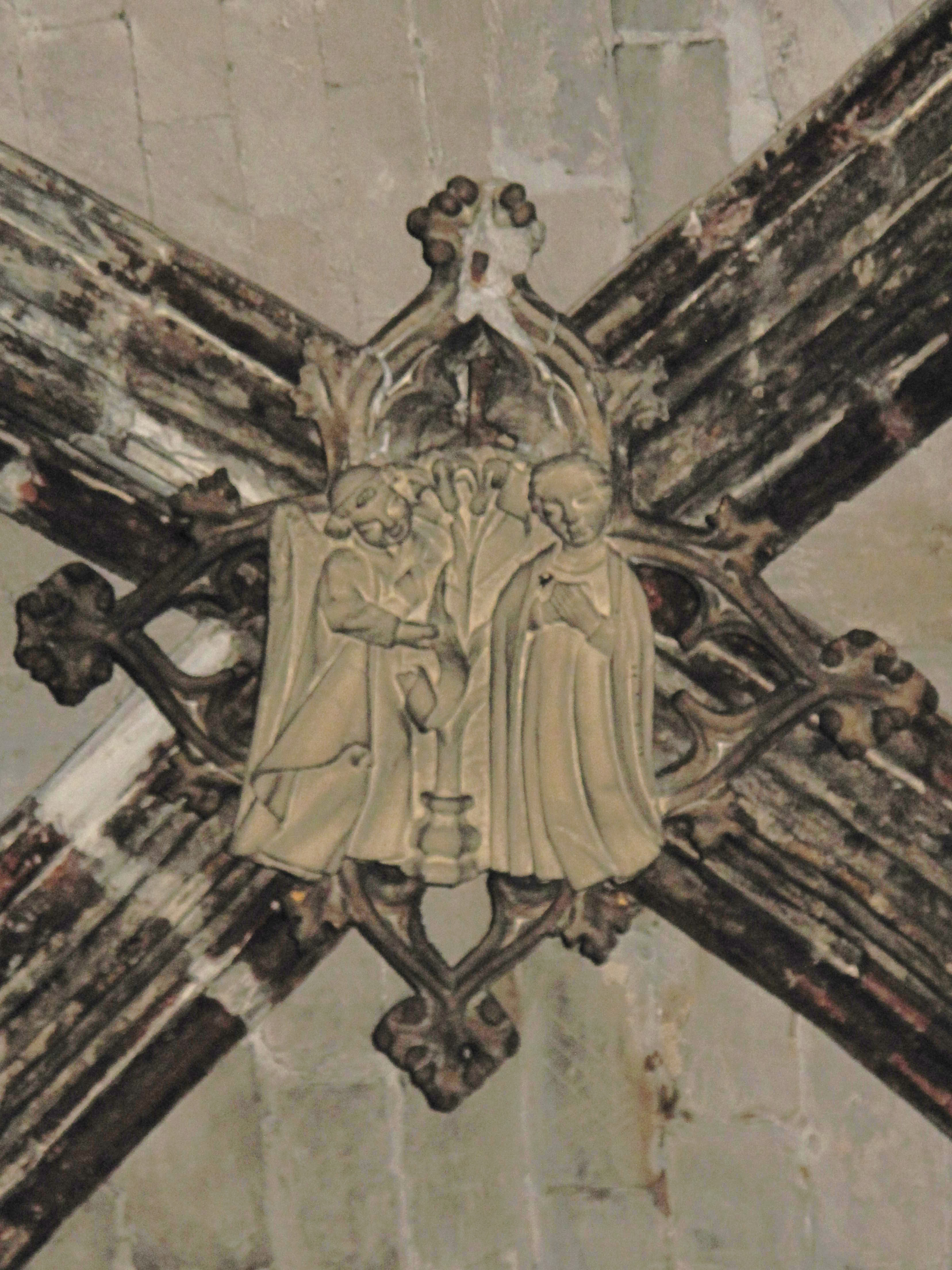
Keystone of a Gothic vault; An angel announces the conception of Christ to Saint Anne

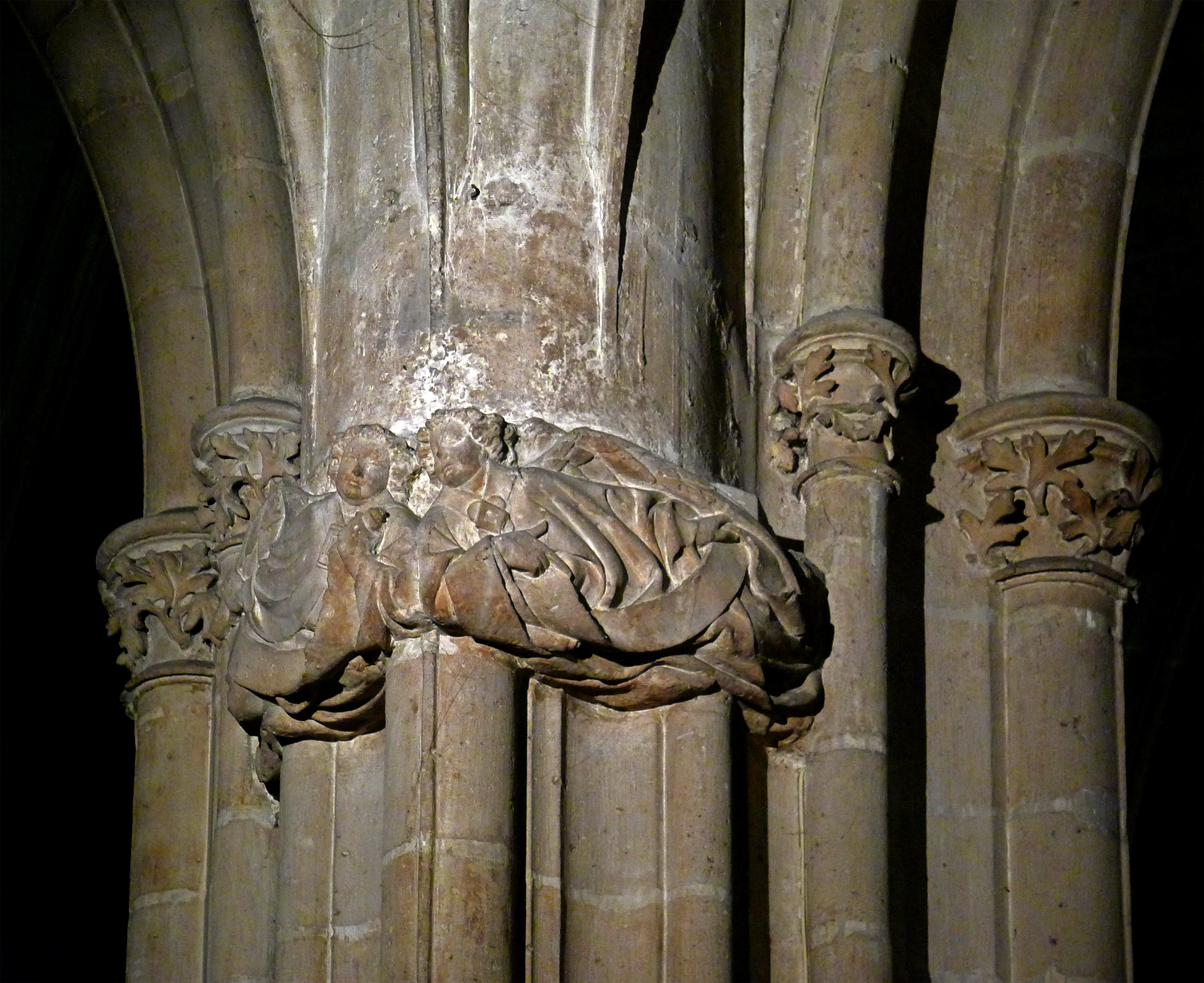
Sculpture on the column capitals

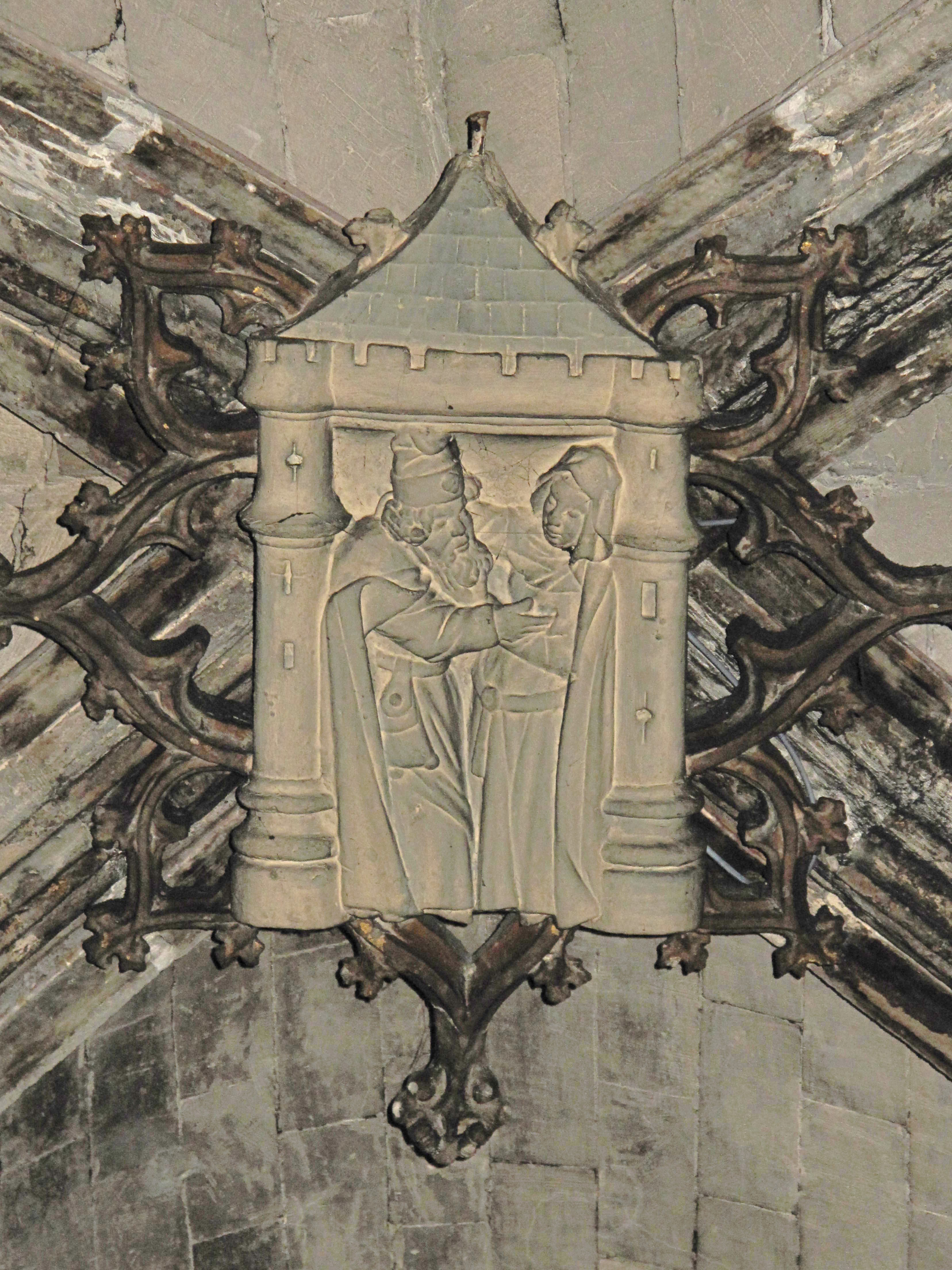
Keystone of a Gothic vault; kiss between Saint-Anne and Saint-Joachim
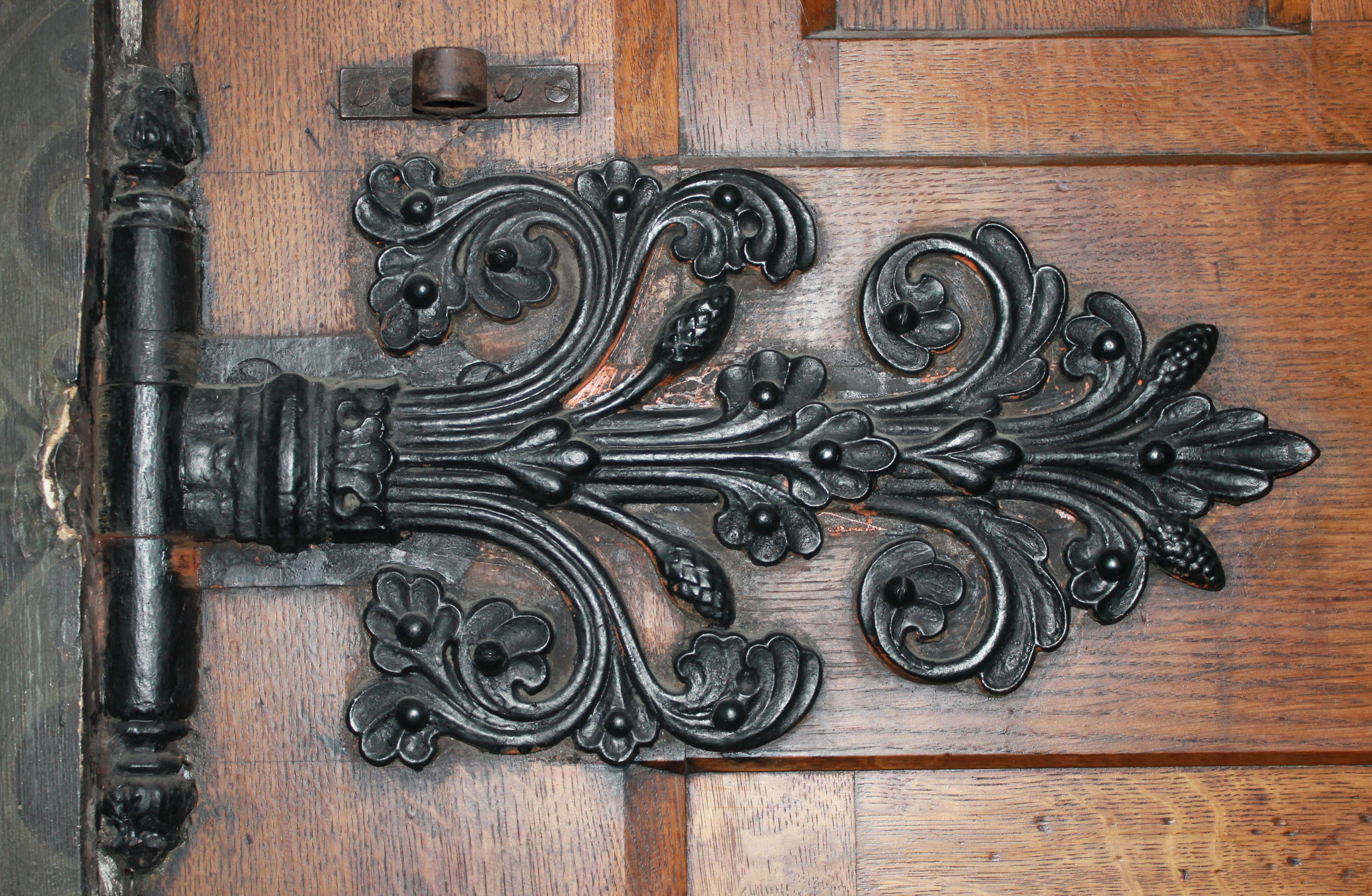
Detail of the iron work on the portal

== The organs ==
The principal organ was built by Alfred Kern of Strasbourg, and was installed in 1963. It has four keyboards and 59 stops. The carved wooden case of the organ dates to 1745, and has been classified as a French historic monument since 1905.

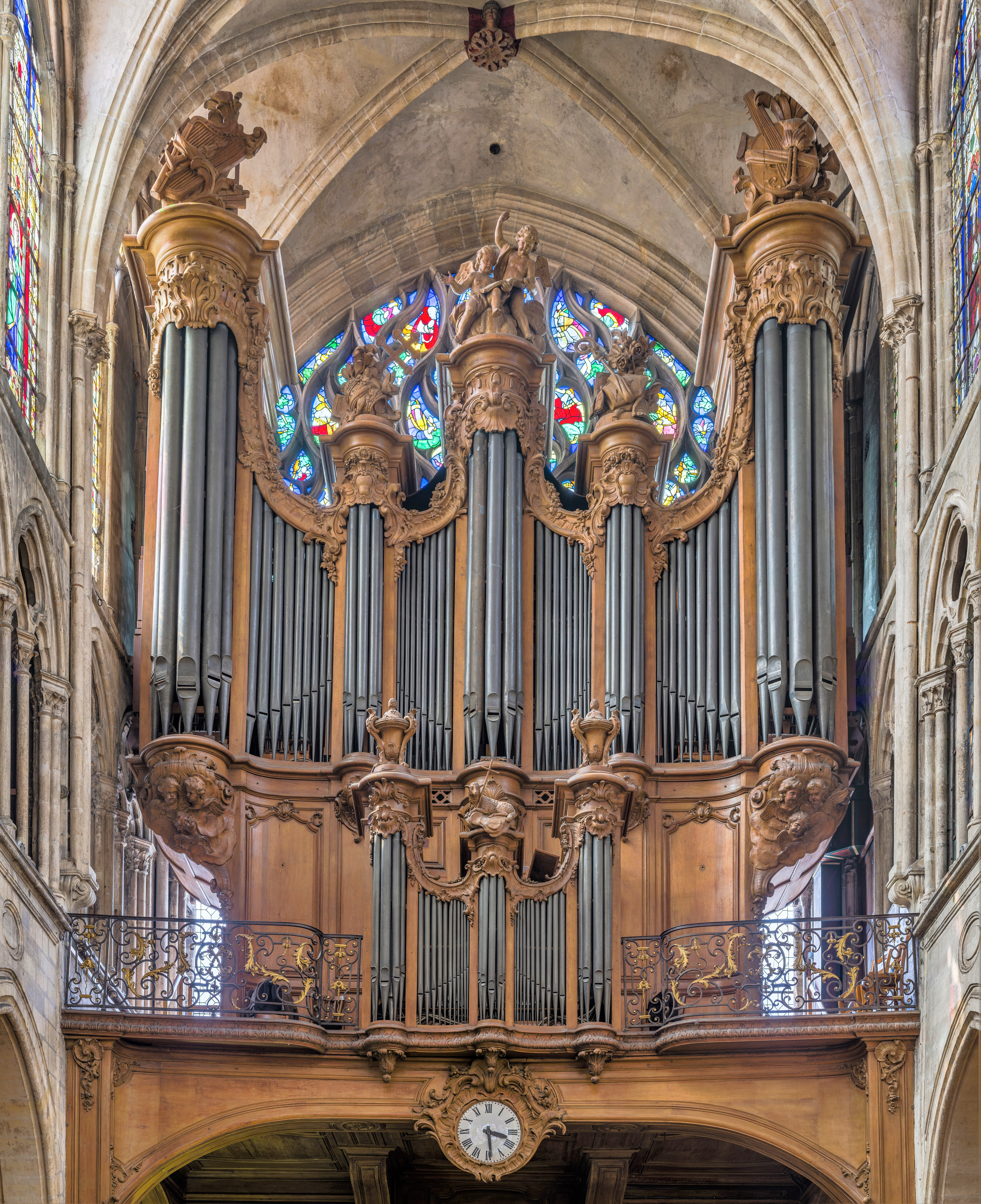
The Grand Organ (case from 1745, organ from 1963)

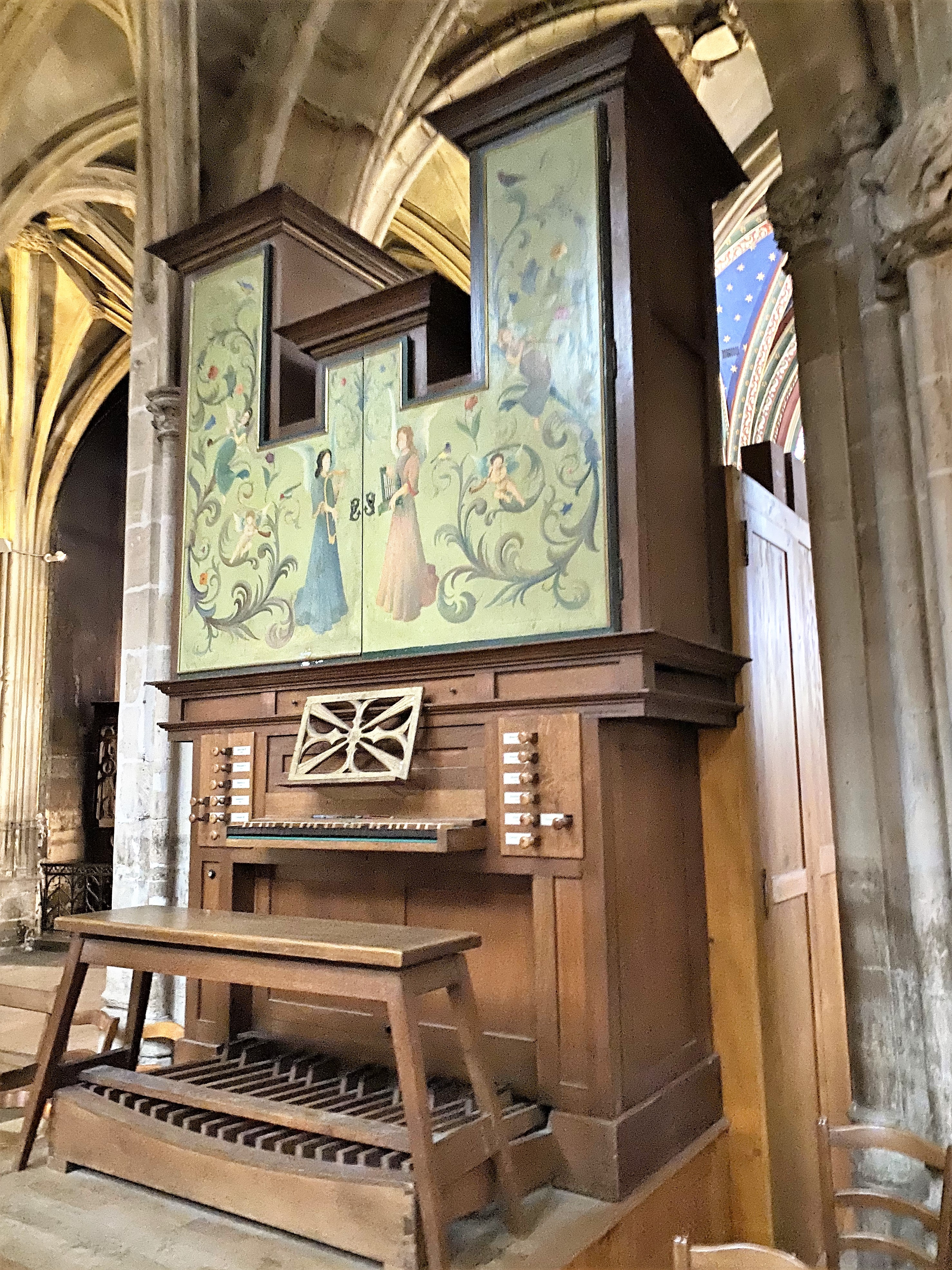
The Choir Organ

== See also ==
- List of historic churches in Paris

== Bibliography (in French) ==
- Dumoulin, Aline; Ardisson, Alexandra; Maingard, Jérôme; Antonello, Murielle (2010). Églises de Paris (in French). Issy-Les-Moulineaux: Éditions Massin. ISBN 978-2-7072-0683-1.
- Hillairet, Jacques; Connaissance du Vieux Paris; (2017); Éditions Payot-Rivages, Paris; (in French). ISBN 978-2-2289-1911-1
