= Church of Saint-Pierre-aux-Bœufs, Paris =

Former church in Paris located on the Île de la Cité

Church of Saint-Pierre-aux-Bœufs
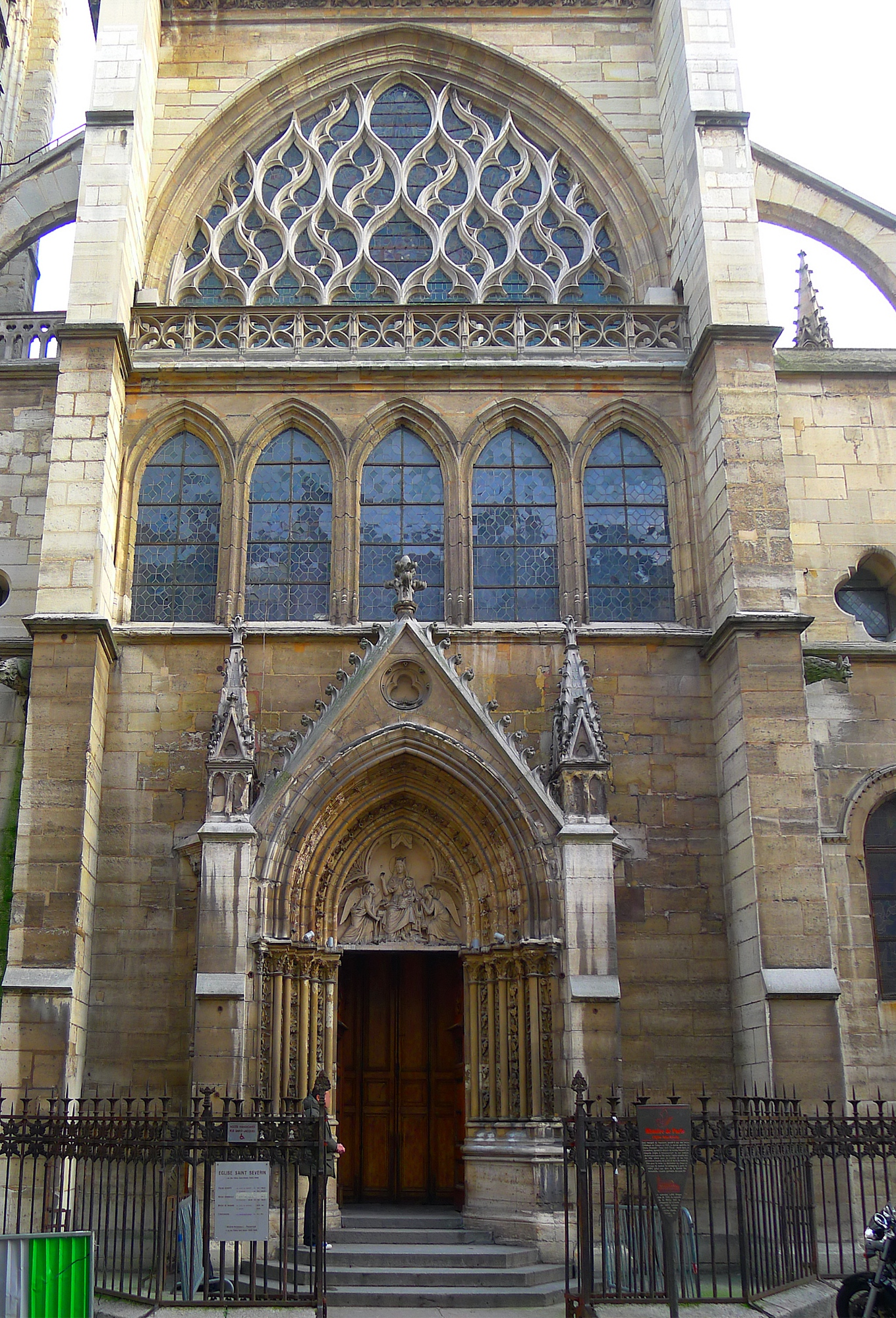
- Western façade of Saint-Séverin Church, where the portal of Saint-Pierre-aux-Bœufs was reassembled in 1839.

- Location in Paris

Religion
- Affiliation: Roman Catholic
- Governing body: Archdiocese of Paris

Location
- Location: Paris
- State: Île-de-France
- Country: France
- Interactive map of Church of Saint-Pierre-aux-Bœufs
- Coordinates: 48.853889°N 2.348889°E

The Church of Saint-Pierre-aux-Bœufs (French: Église Saint-Pierre-aux-Bœufs) was a former church in Paris, situated on the Île de la Cité, near Notre-Dame Cathedral, in what is now Rue d'Arcole.

== History ==
The origins of Saint-Pierre-aux-Bœufs date back to a foundation in 925 by the Count of Paris at the Abbey of Saint-Maur. Its name is believed to derive from a butchers' market located nearby. A local legend recounts that during a procession of the Blessed Sacrament from the church, all passers by knelt in reverence. Remarkably, two oxen being led to the slaughterhouse also knelt, an event commemorated by the carving of two ox heads on the church's façade.

The parish was established in the 12th century. Like other parishes on the Île de la Cité, it was relatively small, encompassing the Rue Saint-Pierre-aux-Bœufs, Rue des Deux-Hermites, Rue Cocatrix, Rue de Perpignan, and Rue des Trois-Canettes, with a population of approximately 1,000 residents.

== Church of clandestine marriages ==
During the Ancien Régime, Saint-Pierre-aux-Bœufs was one of the few parishes in Paris where couples could secretly marry without parental consent. Notable marriages included that of Louis de Buade de Frontenac (1622–1698), future governor of New France, to Anne de La Grange-Trianon (1632–1707) on October 28, 1648, and of the philosopher Denis Diderot (1713–1784) to Anne-Toinette Champion on November 6, 1743.

The poet Nicolas Gilbert (1750–1780), originally from Fontenoy-le-Château, was buried in the church's large crypt on November 17, 1780.

Historical images

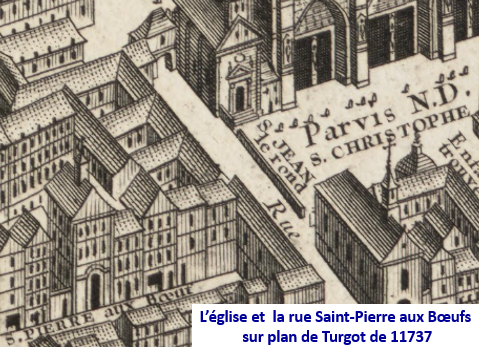
Sketch of Saint-Pierre-aux-Bœufs

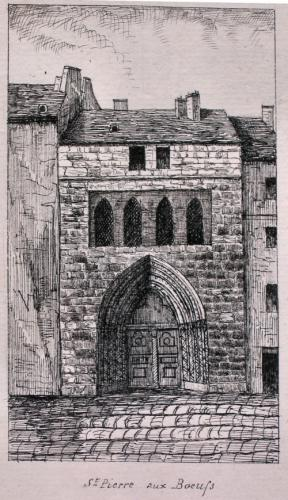
Saint-Pierre aux Boeufs church, drawing.

== Demolition and legacy ==
In 1790, Saint-Pierre-aux-Bœufs was one of the 52 urban parishes in the diocese of Paris. Its priest since 1769, Abbé Julien Brière, refused to take the constitutional oath and was automatically removed from his position in January 1791.

In February 1791, following decrees by the National Constituent Assembly proposed by the Paris municipality, Saint-Pierre-aux-Bœufs and nine other churches on the Île de la Cité lost their parish status in favor of Notre-Dame Cathedral. Located at No. 7 Rue Saint-Pierre-aux-Bœufs, the church was declared national property in 1790 and sold on 8 Fructidor, Year IV (August 25, 1796), to a cooper who converted it into a warehouse around 1812.

During the demolition, the church's portal was preserved and relocated in 1839 by architect Jean-Baptiste-Antoine Lassus to the western façade of the Church of Saint-Séverin, where it remains today. In 1914, excavations on the parvis in front of Notre-Dame uncovered the church's foundations, and sculpted stones recovered from the site were transferred to the Musée Carnavalet.

Demolition and relics

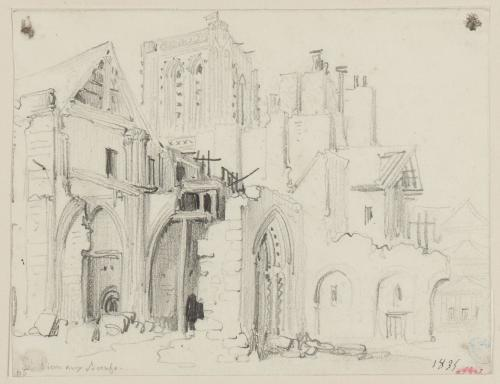
Tympanum of the portal reassembled at Saint-Séverin

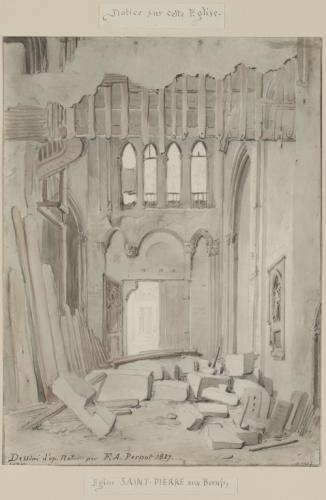
Demolition of the interior of Saint-Pierre-aux-Bœufs in 1837.

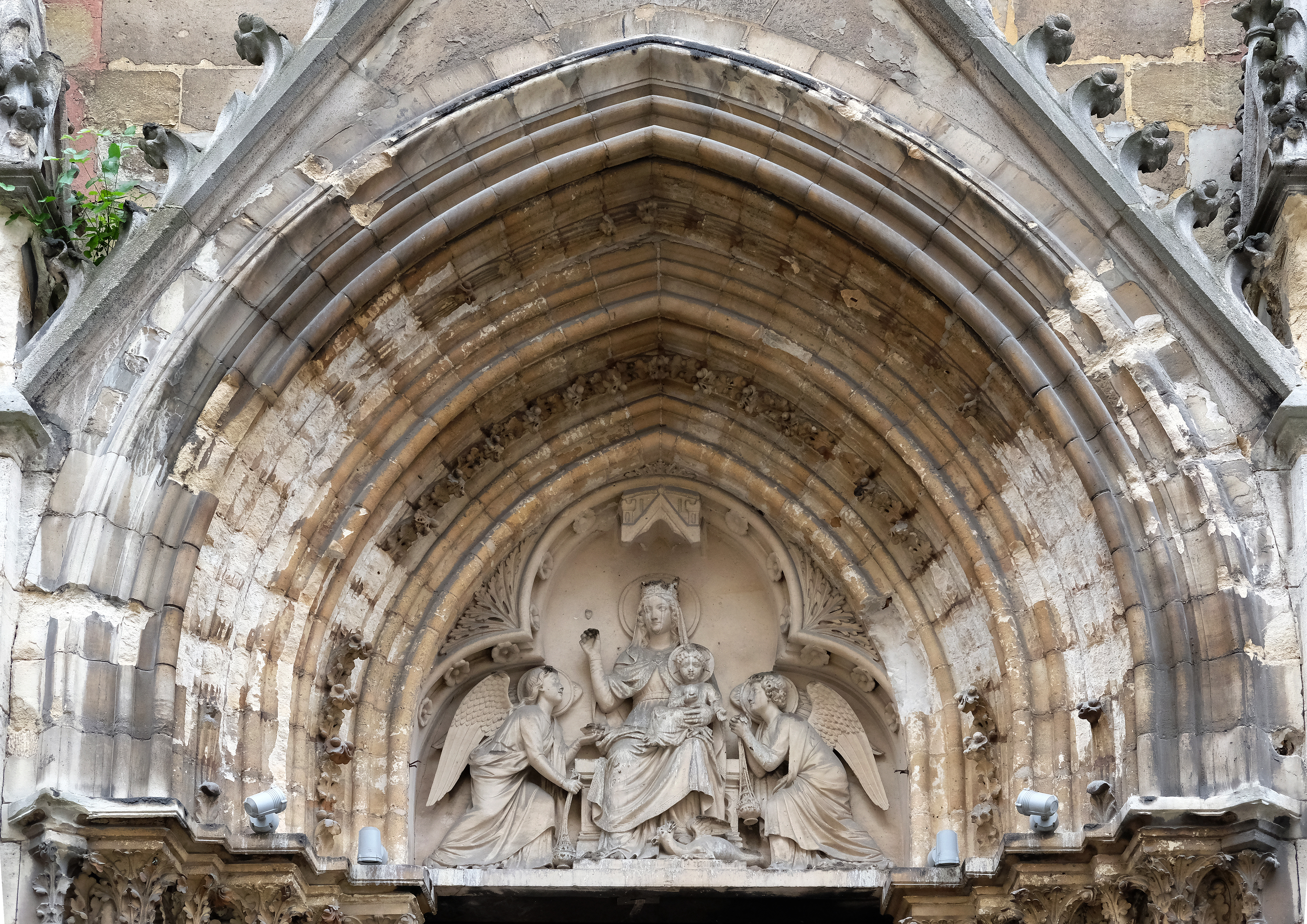
Reassembled portal tympanum on the church of Saint-Séverin.

== See also ==
- Hôtel-Dieu de Paris
