= François Thierry =

French organ builder (1677–1749)

- Born: 1677
- Died: 1749 (aged 71–72)
- Occupation: Organ builder

François Thierry (French pronunciation: [fʁɑ̃swa tjɛʁi]; 1677–1749) was the last representative, in the third generation, of an important family of French organ builders based in Paris. He was the grandson of Pierre Thierry and the nephew of Alexandre Thierry.

== Biography ==
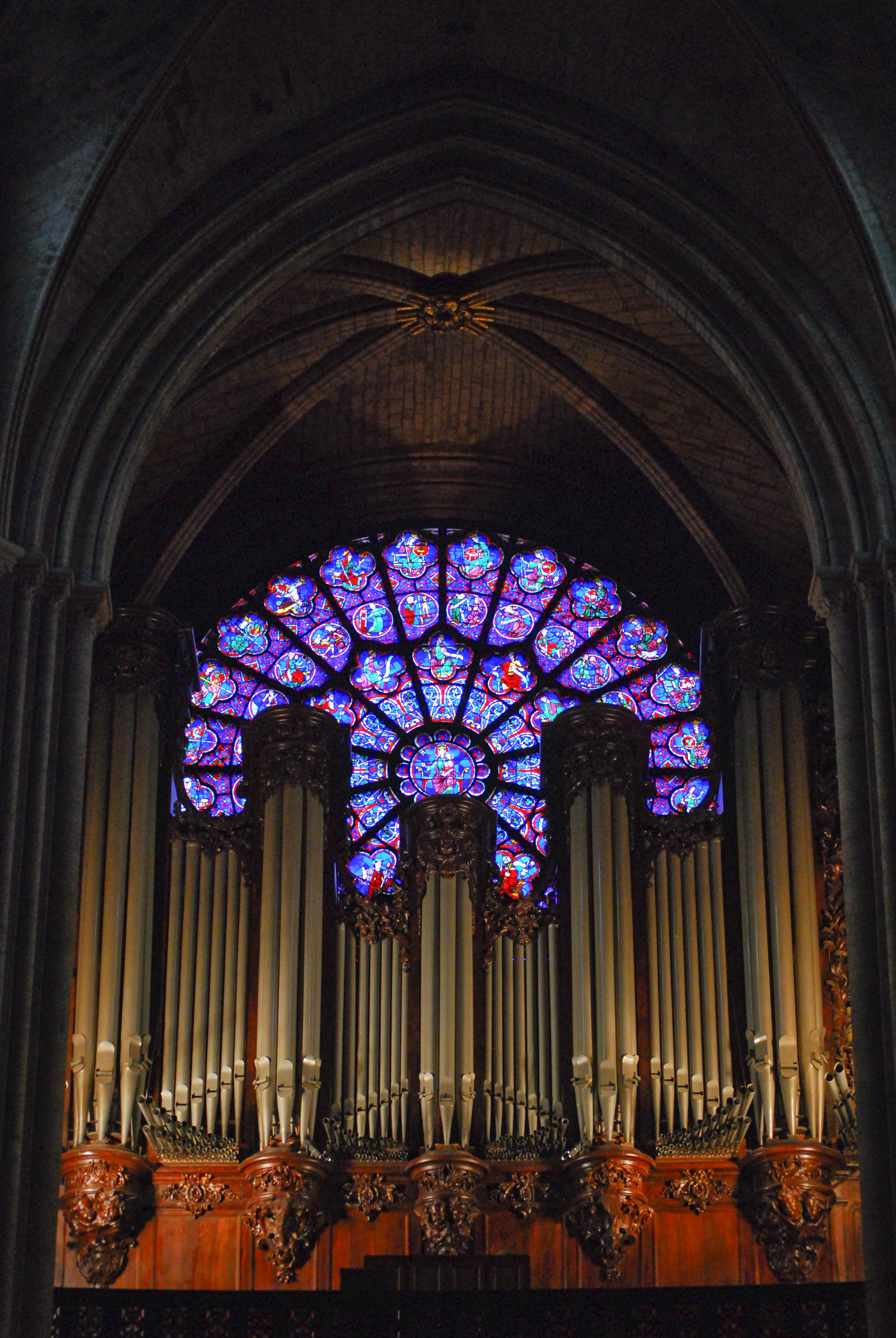
Organ of Notre-Dame de Paris. The buffet is largely unchanged.

François Thierry was born in 1677, son of Jean Thierry, the brother of Alexandre Thierry, who headed the family firm and taught him the art of organ making. After the death of his uncle, François Thierry spent some time perfecting his skills under Pierre-François Deslandes. Then, guided by Henri Lesclop, nephew of Robert Clicquot, he launched out on his own.

François Thierry worked in Nemours in 1703 on the organ of the Saint-Jean-Baptiste church built in 1653 by Pierre Desenclos et Jacques Lefebvre, at the Cathedral of Sainte-Croix d'Orléans from 1703 to 1706, and at the college of Saint-Aignan d'Orléans in 1706. Andreas Silbermann arrived in Strasbourg in 1702, then came to Paris to improve his skills and study Parisian methods of organ making. He was first rebuffed by Jacques Carouge, then found an attentive and generous teacher in François Thierry, who also taught his art to Pierre Legros and Nicolas Dupont of Lorraine.

From 1714 François Couperin sent him to the make improvements to the organ at St-Gervais-et-St-Protais, Paris. With the decline of Robert Clicquot and the disappearance of Henry Lesclop in 1721, he was able to obtain many of the best projects in Paris. His greatest work was the construction in Notre Dame de Paris of a new organ in a new buffet, reusing some components of previous instruments, between 1730 and 1733. The instrument included forty-nine ranks and five manuals. It included several major innovations, and was the largest in the kingdom until Jean-Baptiste-Nicolas Lefebvre completed the monumental organ in the Basilica of St. Martin of Tours. The main part of the buffet can be seen today, little changed. At the reception of the organ, the best organists of the time performed: Guillaume-Antoine Calvière, Pierre Du Mage, Louis-Claude Daquin and Louis-Nicolas Clérambault. The organ was used without problems for fifty years until its reconstruction in 1783 by François-Henri Clicquot.

== Works ==
Selected works include:

- Rouen Cathedral (1717 and 1731)
- Saints-Innocents, Paris (1719 and 1725). The buffet is now visible in Saint-Nicolas-du-Chardonnet
- Saint-Germain-des-Prés (1720 to 1722), the masterpiece of the previous two generations of his family
- The convent of the Immaculate Conception of the Récollettes (1723)
- Saint-Godard, Rouen (1723)
- Soissons Cathedral, where he added a keyboard (1725)
- Saint-Maclou, Rouen whose superb Renaissance buffet still exists (1727)
- Basilica of St Quentin (1737) for the organ begun just before his death in 1703, by his uncle Alexandre Thierry with Robert Clicquot
