= Pierre Thierry =

Pierre Thierry may refer to:

- Pierre Thierry (organ builder) (1604–1665), the founder of the Thierry dynasty of organ builders of Paris, France
- Pierre Thierry (cyclist) (born 2003), French cyclist
