= Alexandre Thierry =

French organ builder (c.1646–1699)

- Born: c. 1646; Paris, France
- Died: 1699; Paris
- Occupation: Organ builder

Alexandre Thierry (c. 1646 - 1699) was a French organ builder, son of the organ builder Pierre Thierry, and the most distinguished of the second generation of this organ-building dynasty.

== Biography ==
Alexandre Thierry was born in Paris around 1646, the youngest of three sons of the organ-builder Pierre Thierry and the most talented. He took charge of the family business on his father's death. Working with his brothers Charles and Jean, after the death of his father he completed the organ of the Abbey of Saint-Germain-des-Prés in 1667. This was considered his greatest work, an organ with 39 stops and four manuals, the first organ with four manuals in Paris.

From 1680 to 1687, thanks to the protection of the king's organists Nicolas Lebègue and Guillaume-Gabriel Nivers, Alexandre Thierry maintained and improved the Royal positive organs at the Palace of Versailles, Château de Saint-Germain-en-Laye, Palace of Fontainebleau and Saint-Cyr. He was responsible for the organ in the royal chapel of Saint-Germain-en-Laye. Thanks to Lebègue he was given the job of building the organ for the Hôtel des Gobelins in 1684 with nineteen stops, three manuals and pedal. He also worked in Province, in Rouen and Lyon where he built the organ of the Cordeliers in the Church of St. Bonaventure (1689-1690).

From 1691 to 1692 Alexandre Thierry and Hippolyte Ducastel jointly undertook major work in the Cathedral of Notre-Dame, Paris. Alexandre Thierry restored the organ in the Sainte-Chapelle du Palais, and then built the instrument of the Abbey of Saint-Sauveur d'Anchin in 1697, with 32 stops, 4 manuals and pedal.

Alexandre Thierry died without an heir in 1699, and was succeeded by his nephew, François Thierry, son of Jean. His death interrupted his last work, the monumental instrument of the Basilica of Saint-Quentin. The buffet which still exists, begun in 1697 and completed in 1703 by his partner in this business, Robert Clicquot. The organ had 48 stops, four manuals and pedal.

== Work ==
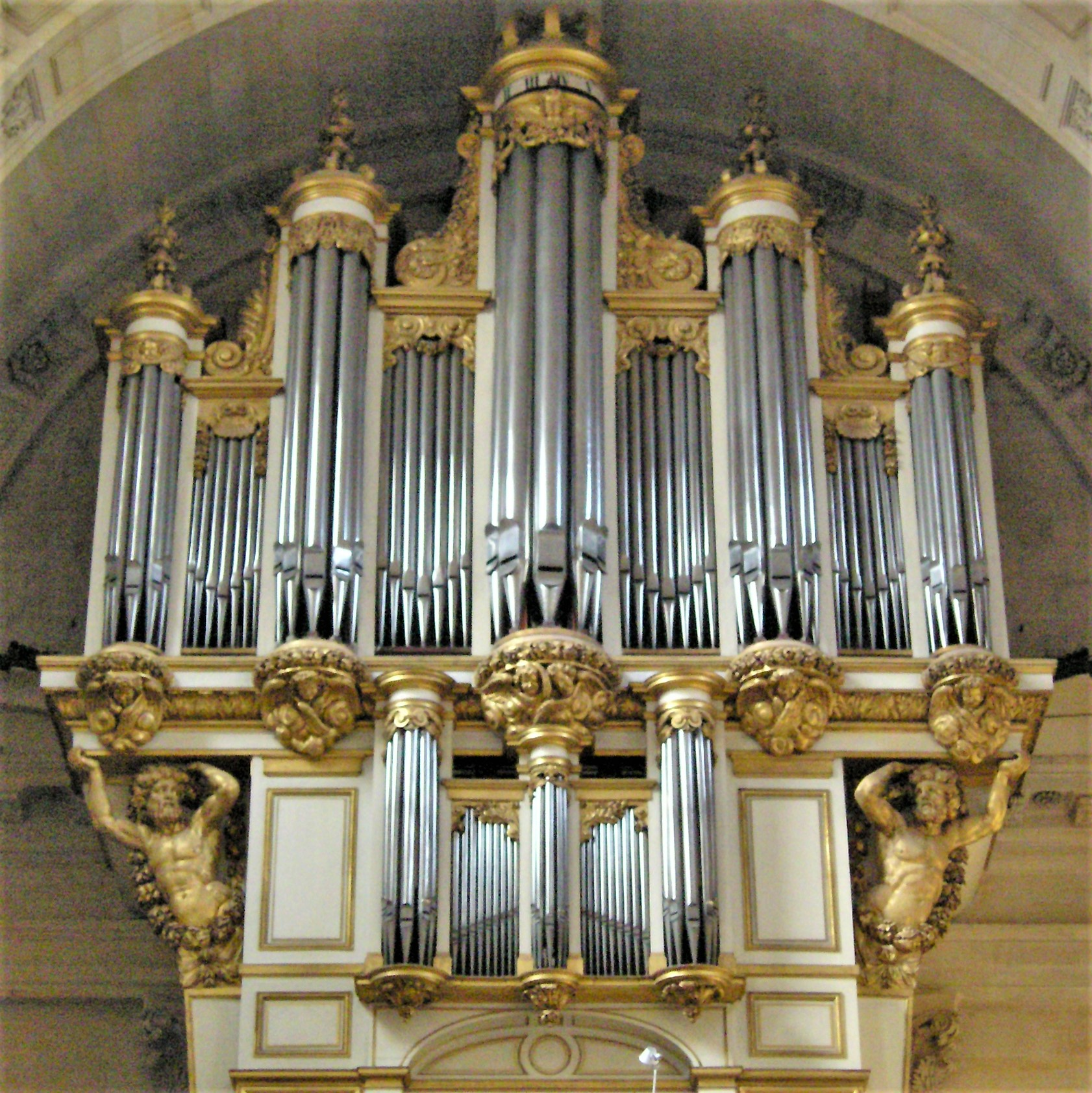
Organ at Saint-Louis-des-Invalides

Work included:

- Saint-Séverin, Paris with his brother Charles in 1670, a work for which he was famous
- Vauluisant Abbey in 1673
- Abbey of St. Victor, Paris, destroyed in 1811
- St-Gervais-et-St-Protais, Paris in 1676 and 1684
- Hôtel des Invalides, Paris (1679-1682), a masterpiece of which the buffet by the royal carpenter Germain Pillon exists today.
- Saint-Germain-l’Auxerrois, disappeared during the French Revolution
- Saint-Eustache, Paris in 1680
