= Crespin Carlier =

French organ builder (c. 1560–1636)

- Born: c. 1560; Laon, Picardy, France
- Died: 1636
- Occupation: Organ builder

Crespin Carlier (or Crépin Carlier) (c. 1560 – 1636) was a French organ builder who had great influence on the development of organs in France. He was a contemporary and colleague of Matthijs Langhedul, another great organ builder who introduced Flemish and Walloon styles to France.

== Biography ==
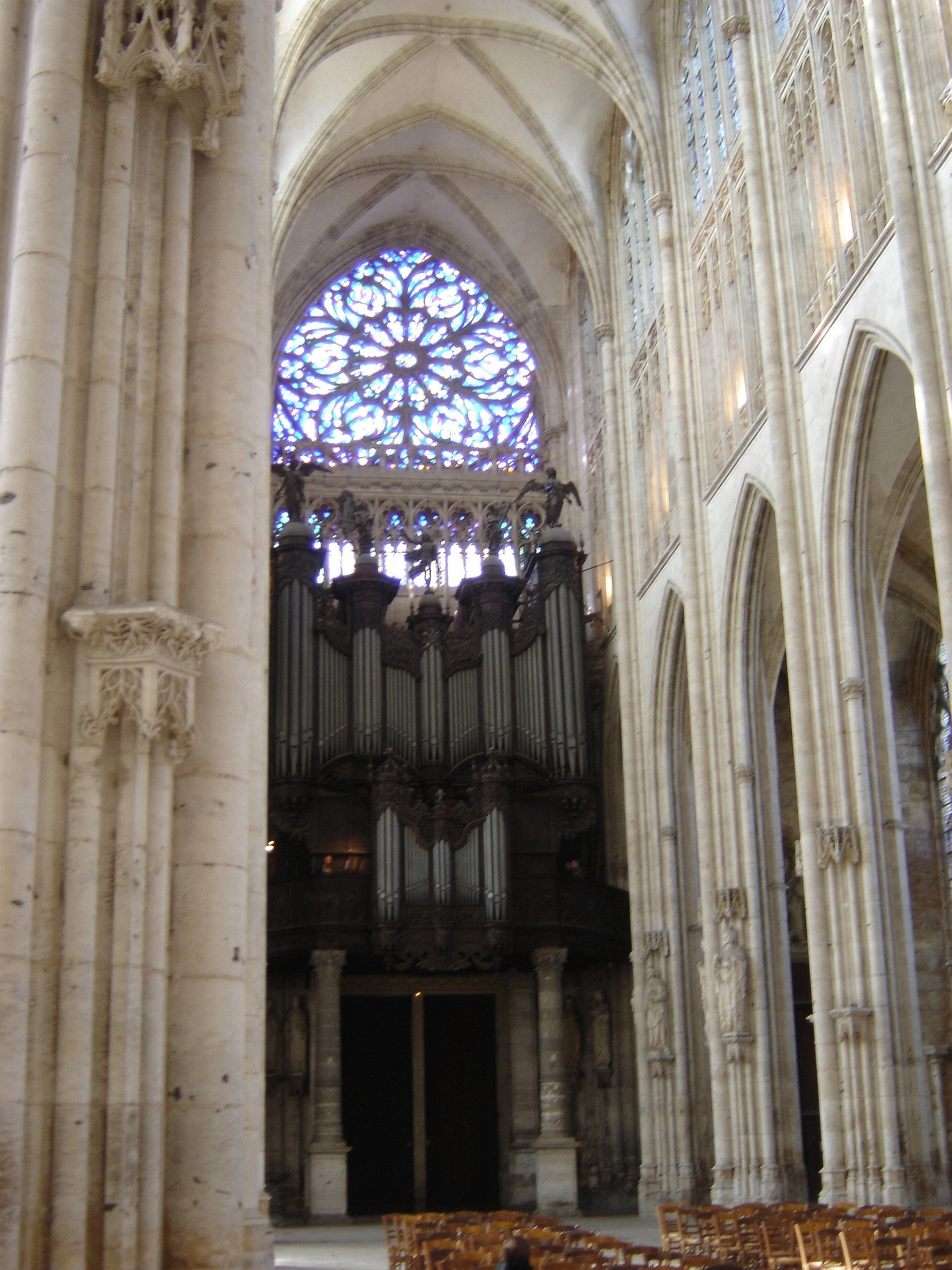
Organ of the Abbey Church of Saint-Ouen in Rouen after being enlarged and rebuilt by Aristide Cavaillé-Coll

Crespin Carlier was born in Laon in the Picardy region of northern France around 1560. Carlier's family had been involved in building organs since the sixteenth century. He was based in Lille from 1590 to 1600, when he moved to Rouen. He is recorded to have done work in Courtrai in 1585, Ghent between 1597 and 1611, the church of Saint-Jean-Baptiste in Namur in 1598, at Hesdin between 1599 and 1600.

He was invited to Rouen in 1600 by the composer and organist Jean Titelouze to restore the Rouen Cathedral organ, and was often employed by Titelouze afterwards. He worked in Antwerp in 1601. He worked in various parts of Flanders, including Dunkirk, Saint-Omer, Ghent and Namur. With a growing reputation, he was asked to work at Chartres Cathedral in 1614.

In 1614 Jehan Lebas of Rouen was paid 360 livres to build an oakwood organ buffet for the church of Saint-André in Rouen, while Crespin Carlier was paid 800 livres to supply the organ itself. He undertook work at Bruges in 1618. On 24 October 1618 he signed an agreement with the parish of Gisors to overhaul the Great Organ at Notre-Dame de l'Assomption, completed in 1580 by Nicolas Barbier. The work included revising the existing stops, adding three new stops and adding a "Positif de dos" to the case. The work was completed in 1620. The Laon city archives record a payment on 19 January 1623 to Philippe Ducastel for making a case for an organ supplied by Carlier for the church of Cordeliers in Laon.

Crespin Carlier was invited to Rouen by Jean Titelouze, organist of Rouen Cathedral. The organ that he built there has been called "the finest organ of the period". In 1630 he rebuilt the facade of the Grand Organ at the abbey church of Saint-Ouen (Église abbatiale Saint-Ouen) in Rouen according to plans provided by Titelouze. This was an 8-foot instrument with two 48-note manuals and a 28-note independent pedal. Over the years the organ was to go through major extensions and overhauls, culminating in a complete rebuilding in 1888-1890 by Aristide Cavaillé-Coll. Of the original, parts of the case survive and about 40% of the pipework.

Carlier returned to Laon in 1631. He also worked on an organ, now lost, at Saint-Nicolas-des-Champs in Paris between 1632 and 1636.

== Influences ==
Carlier introduced a number of fundamental innovations in organ design from northern Europe to France. His work shows strong similarities to that of the Langhedul family. He may have benefited from working with Jan Langhedul in Rouen. From 1631 onward Carlier collaborated with Matthijs Langhedul on the organ at St. Jacques de la Boucherie in Paris, which introduced important innovations. The organ builder Wangnon from Liége was one of his disciples. Another pupil was Pierre Thierry (1604-1665) who renovated the organ at Saint-Gervais. Thierry worked with Carlier between 1634 and 1635 at St. Nicholas-des-champs.

== Work ==
- 1600 Rouen Cathedral restoration
- 1603 Rouen St. Michel repair
- 1603 Rouen St. Jean repair
- 1606 Paris St. Antoine construction
- 1607 Poitiers Jacobin convent construction
- 1610-1613 Poitiers Cathedral construction
- 1611 Tours Cathedral enlargement
- 1614 Rouen St. André construction
- 1614 Chartres Cathedral repair
- 1620 Gisors construction
- 1623 Laon Cathedral construction
- St. Gervais construction
- St. Protais rehabilitation of a Barbier organ, destroyed in World War II
- 1629 Rouen St. Ouen construction
- 1631 Paris St. Jacques de la Boucherie construction (with Matthijs Langhedul),
