= Daniel Kern Manufacture d'Orgues =

French organ building company

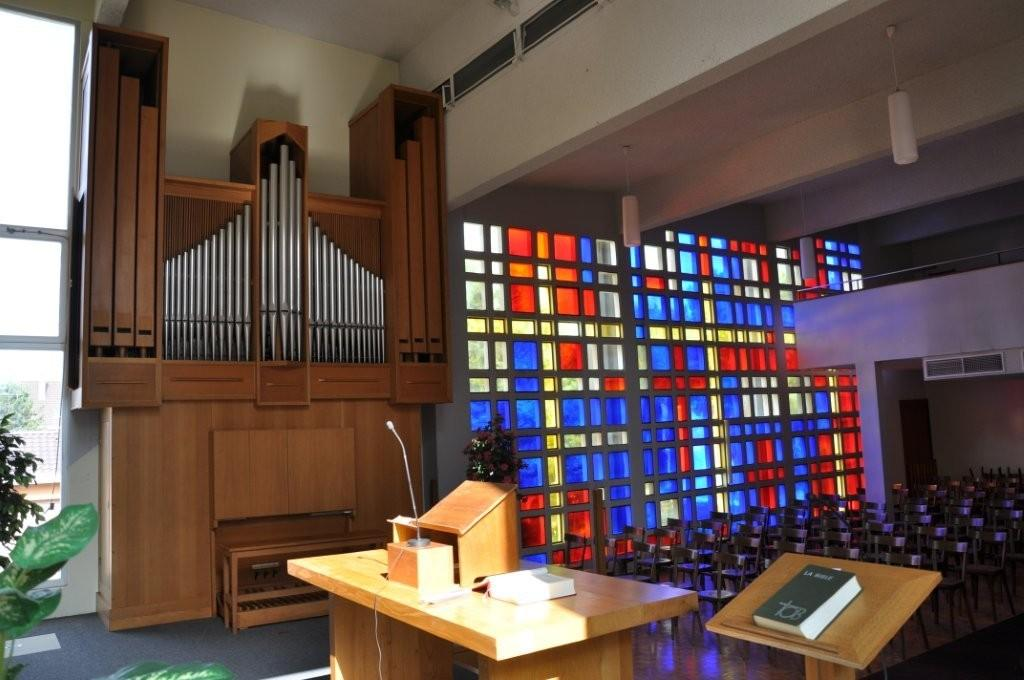
- Saint-Marc's Reformed Chapel (Bourtzwiller, Mulhouse). A Kern organ is visible.
- Industry: Organ building
- Founded: 1953
- Defunct: 2015
- Fate: Dissolved
- Headquarters: Strasbourg, France
- Products: Pipe organs
- Owner: Alfred Kern (1953-1977) Daniel Kern (1977-2018)
- Website: kernpipeorgan.com

Daniel Kern Manufacture d'Orgues (English: Daniel Kern, Organ Manufacturer; formerly Alfred Kern & Fils until 1977) were an organ builder based in Strasbourg, France. Their organs were installed in many churches in France and other countries. In addition, the firm undertook restoration work on historic organs.

== History ==
Jean Alfred Kern (12 February 1910 in Vendenheim - 13 October 1989 in Strasbourg) founded the company in 1953, encouraged by Dr Albert Schweitzer, a Nobel Prize winner and philosopher who was also an organist. Kern made organs using traditional techniques, as well as repairing historically valuable instruments. His son Daniel Pierre Kern (27 March 1950 in Strasbourg - 16 August 2019 in Vervant) then continued the tradition. In 1961 Alfred Kern built the core of the organ in the church of Gunsbach, designed by Albert Schweitzer, who described this as his "last work". In 1977, Daniel took over his father's former position.

The firm were declared bankrupt in 2015 and shut down.

== Installations ==
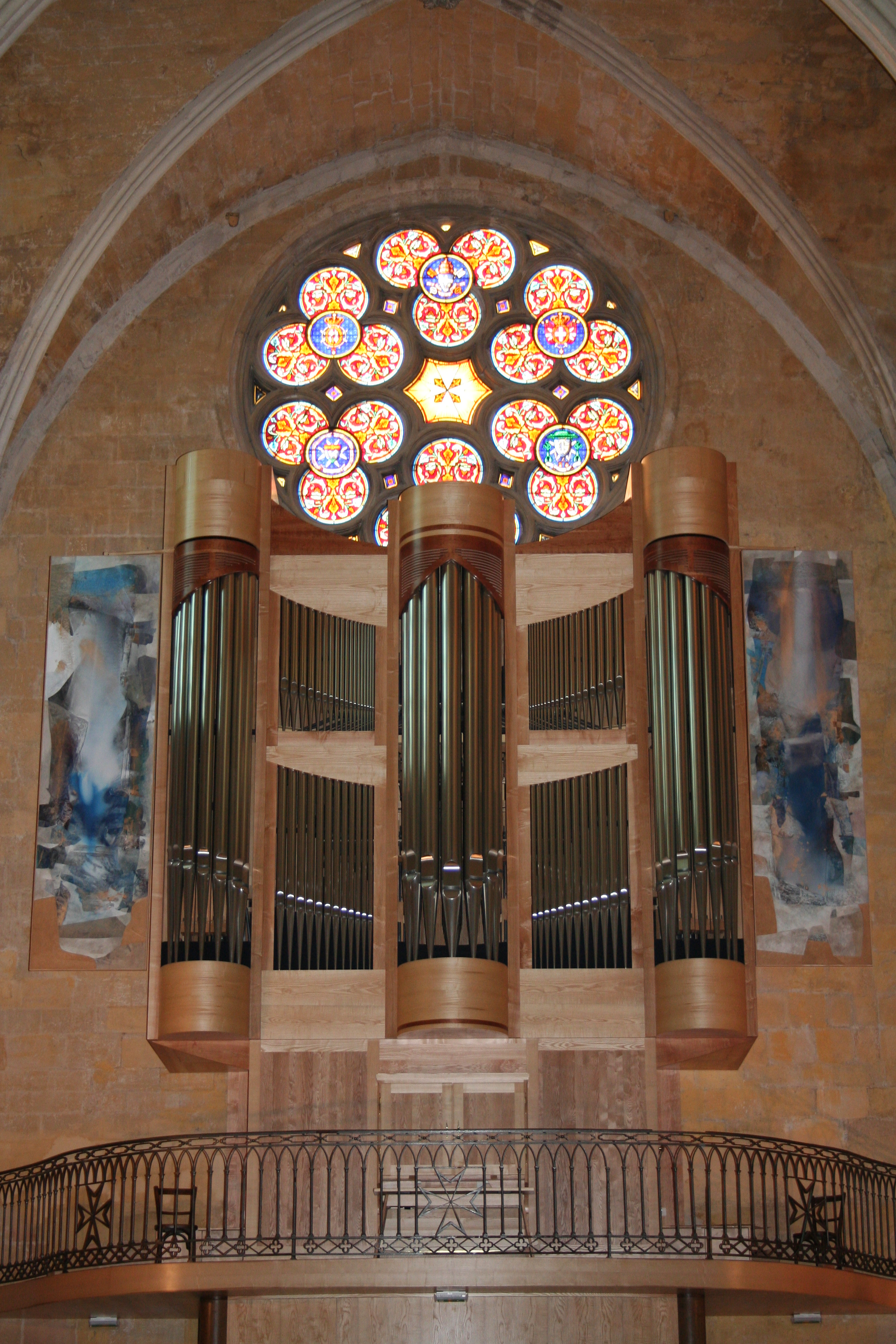
The baroque-style Kern organ (2006) at the west end of the nave in the Church of Saint-Jean-de-Malte, Aix-en-Provence

The company mostly built or repaired church organs, but also built small organs for music schools and associations.

Kern organs can be found in France in several places in Strasbourg, in the church of Saint-Jean-de-Malte in Aix-en-Provence, in the Anglican Church of Sainte-Jeanne-de-Chantal in Paris and in the Church of Saint-Pothin in Lyon.

Other organs are in Japan and Austria. In Germany, Kern organs are found in Hagen, Burg, Dithmarschen, Bremen (Lesum).

The great pipe organ of St. George's Church, Haguenau was built in 1988, installed in a case by Eberhard Friedrich Walcker from 1867. The Sapporo Concert Hall in Japan, completed in 1997, includes a huge 4,976-pipe Kern organ in the main concert hall, which took two years to build. The Dresden Frauenkirche, an eighteenth-century Lutheran Church, was destroyed by fire bombing in February 1945 during World War II. It was rebuilt, with Daniel Kern supplying the organ, completed in April 2005. The new organ is not an exact replica of the original Silbermann organ, a decision that caused some controversy at the time, including some loss of funding.

== Reconstruction projects ==
The company were involved in the restoration of historic organs by builders such as Johann Andreas Silbermann, Robert Clicquot, Aristide Cavaillé-Coll and Joseph Merklin.

A major restoration of the organ in the Église Saint-Jacques-du-Haut-Pas in Paris were undertaken in the 1960s by the Kern firm. This organ was made by Matthijs Langhedul. Part of the wooden case had been made by Claude Delaistre in 1587, so the church has part of the oldest organ case in Paris. The new organ, which retains parts of the old instrument, was inaugurated on 18 May 1971 by Pierre Cochereau. The Organ in St. Thomas, Strasbourg was built by Silbermann between 1737 and 1741. Over the years it went through many changes, but retained many of the original components. The firm then undertook a careful restoration, which was completed in 1979.

In 1981 Alfred Kern & fils undertook a repair of the historical suspended pipe organ on the north side of the central nave in Strasbourg Cathedral. In 2004 Kern began work on repair of the Roethinger organ in Strasbourg's Ste-Madeleine church. An organ built in 1762 by Johann Andreas Silbermann was transferred in 1865 to the St. Moriz Church of the parish of Soultz-les-Bains. There, it was restored to its 1848 condition by Alfred Kern & fils between 2006 and 2008.

== Gallery ==
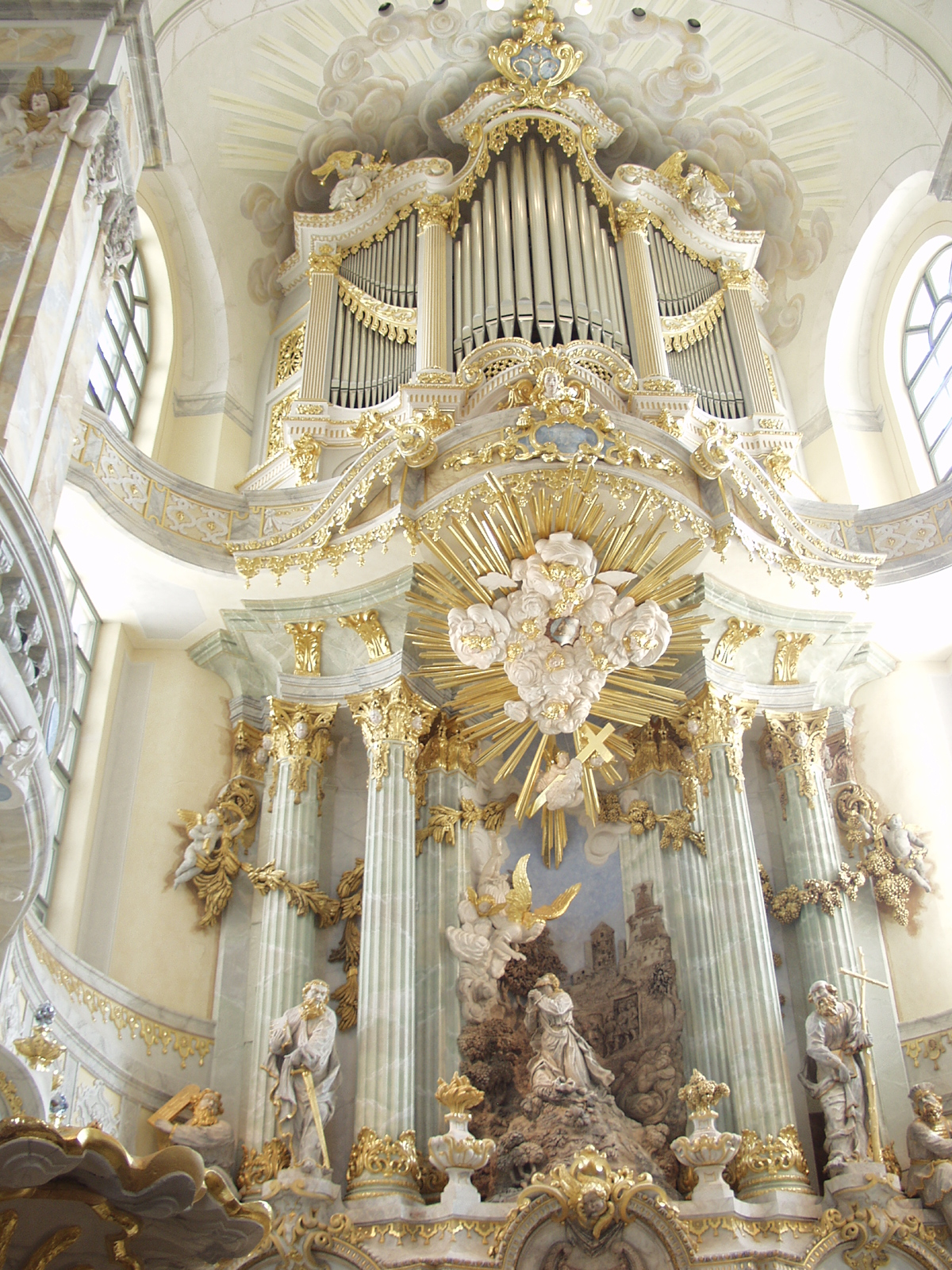
Altar in the Frauenkirche of Dresden

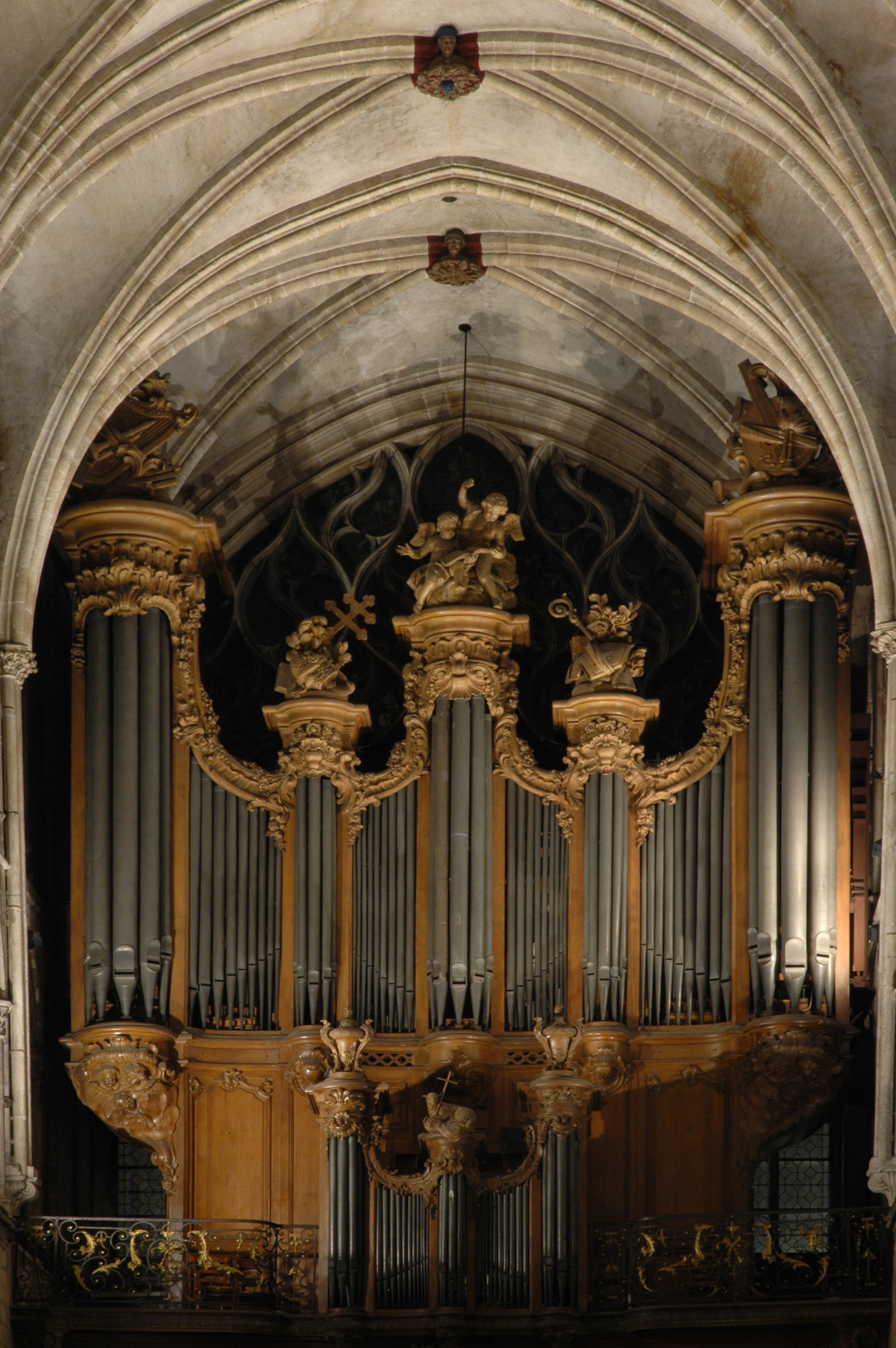
Great organ in the church of Saint-Séverin, Paris

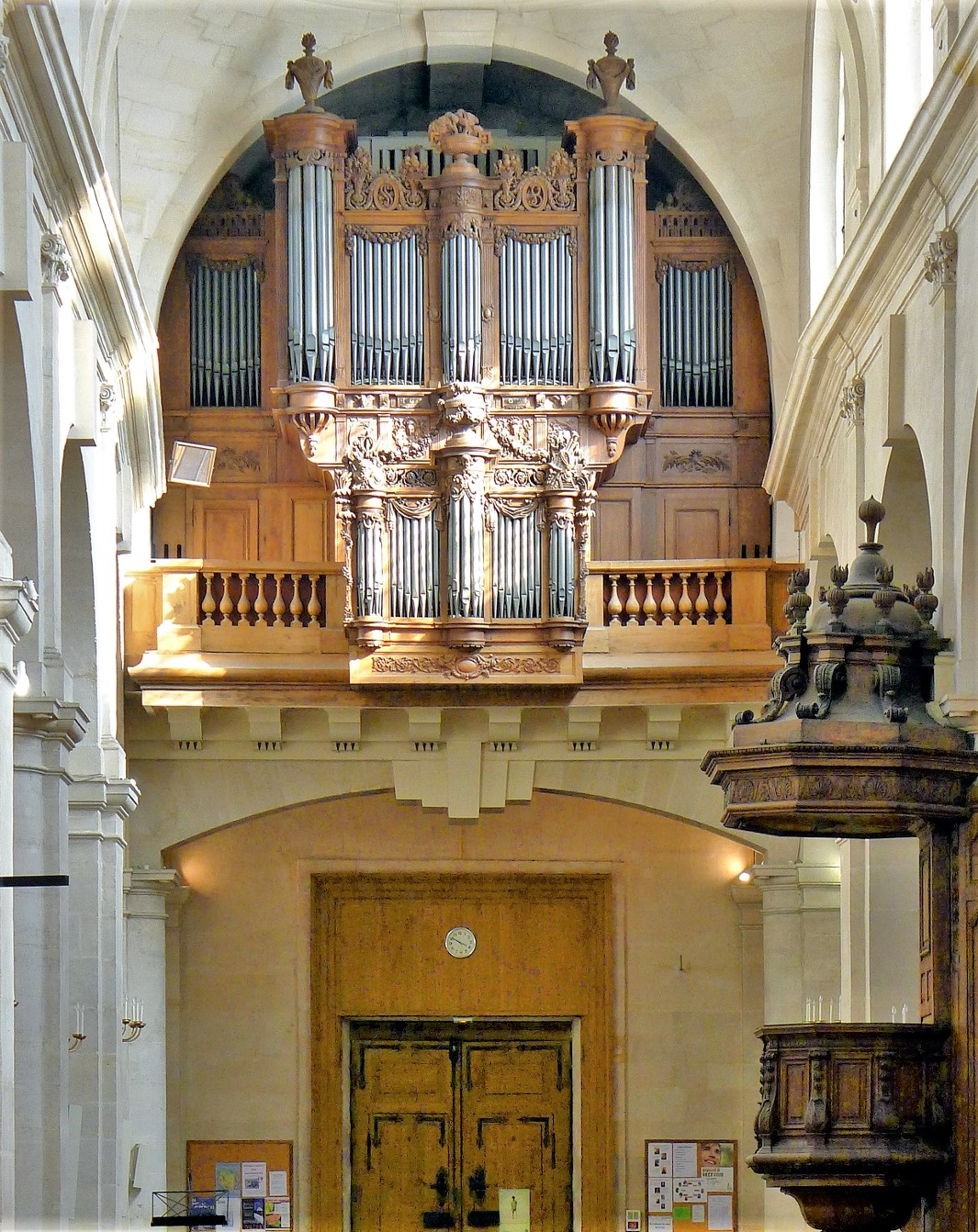
Saint-Jacques-du-Haut-Pas - Paris

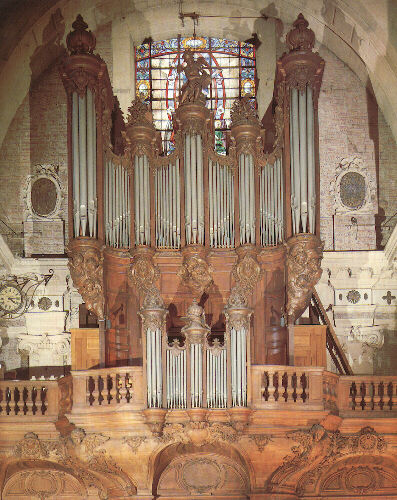
Church of Notre-Dame-des-Victoires. Case from 1739 by Louis Régnier. Instrument by Alfred Kern from 1973.
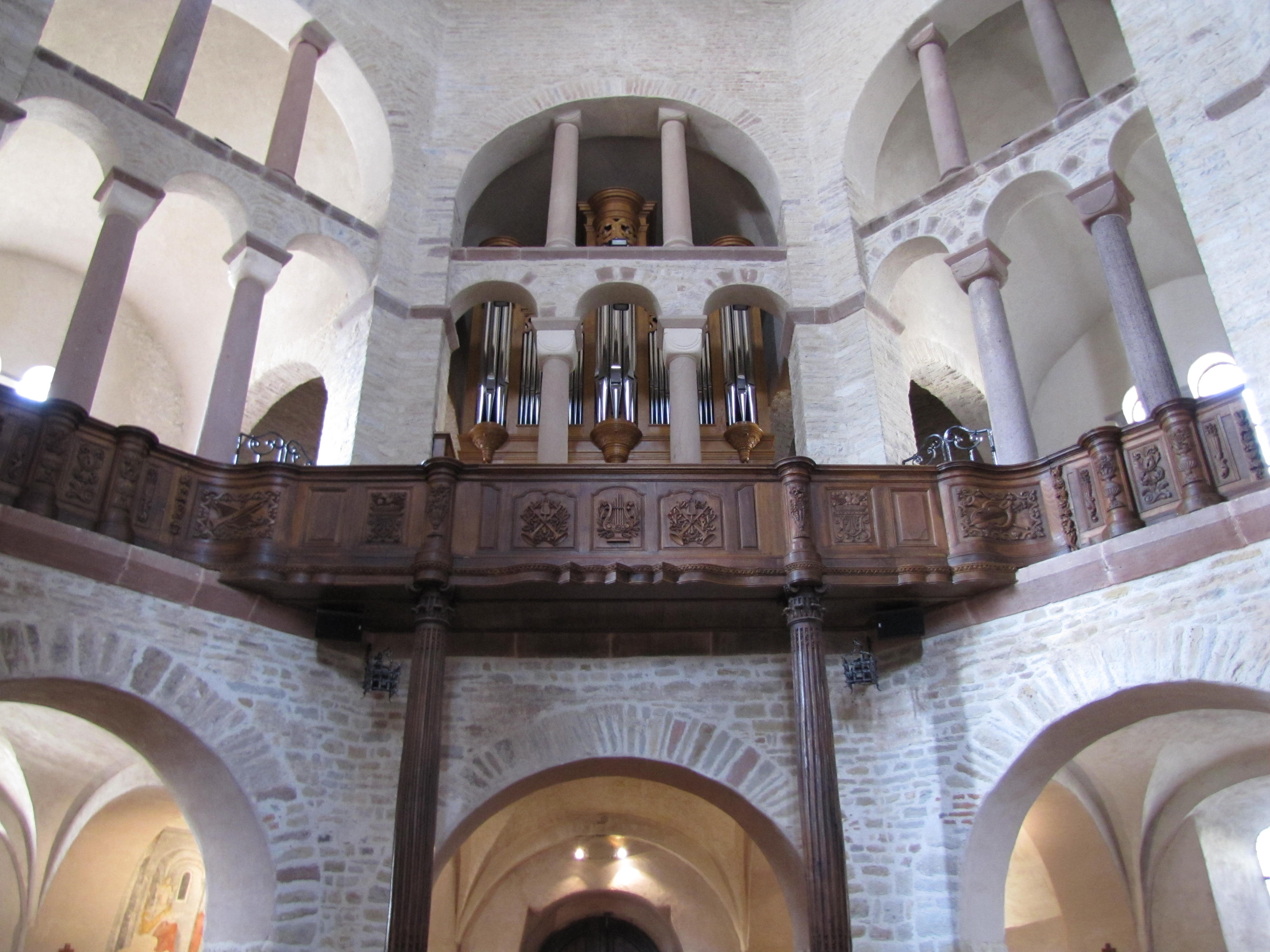
Alsace, Haut-Rhin, Ottmarsheim, Church of Saints-Pierre et Paul

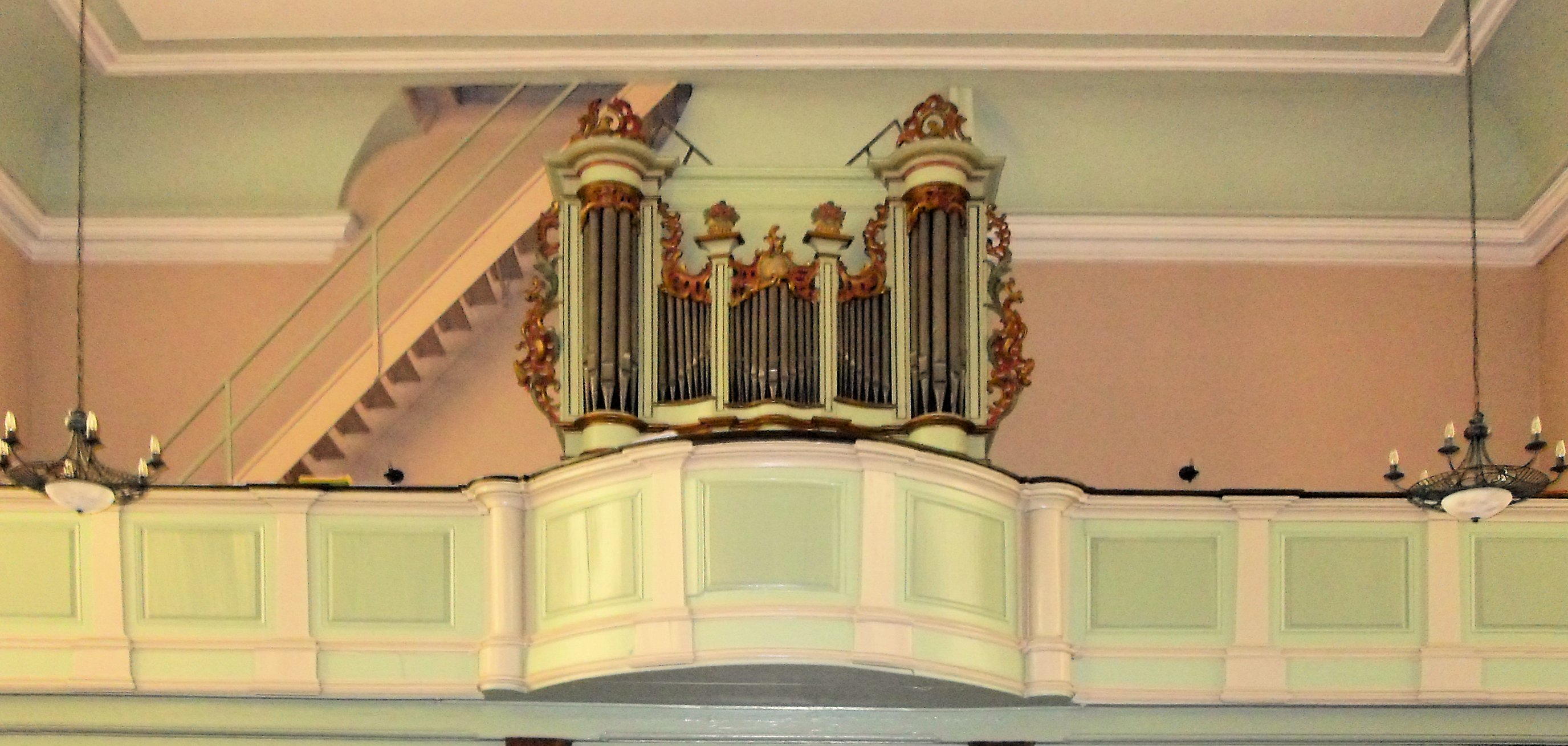
Organ by Louis Dubois c. 1759 in the Church of Saint-Nicolas d'Oberentzen

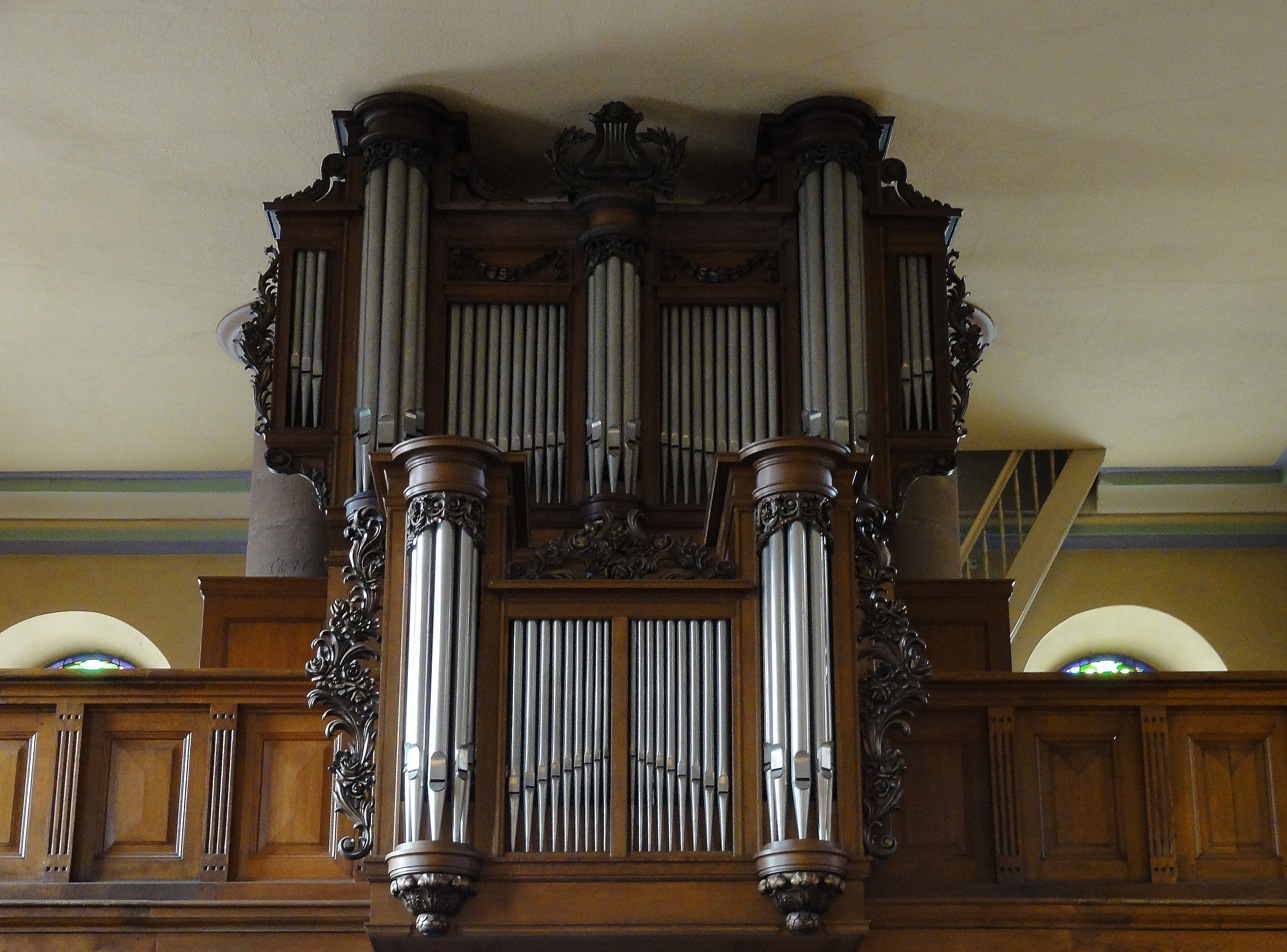
Alsace, Bas-Rhin, Niederbronn-les-Bains, Saint-Jean Protestant Church, Organ Geib-Kern (1807-1069)

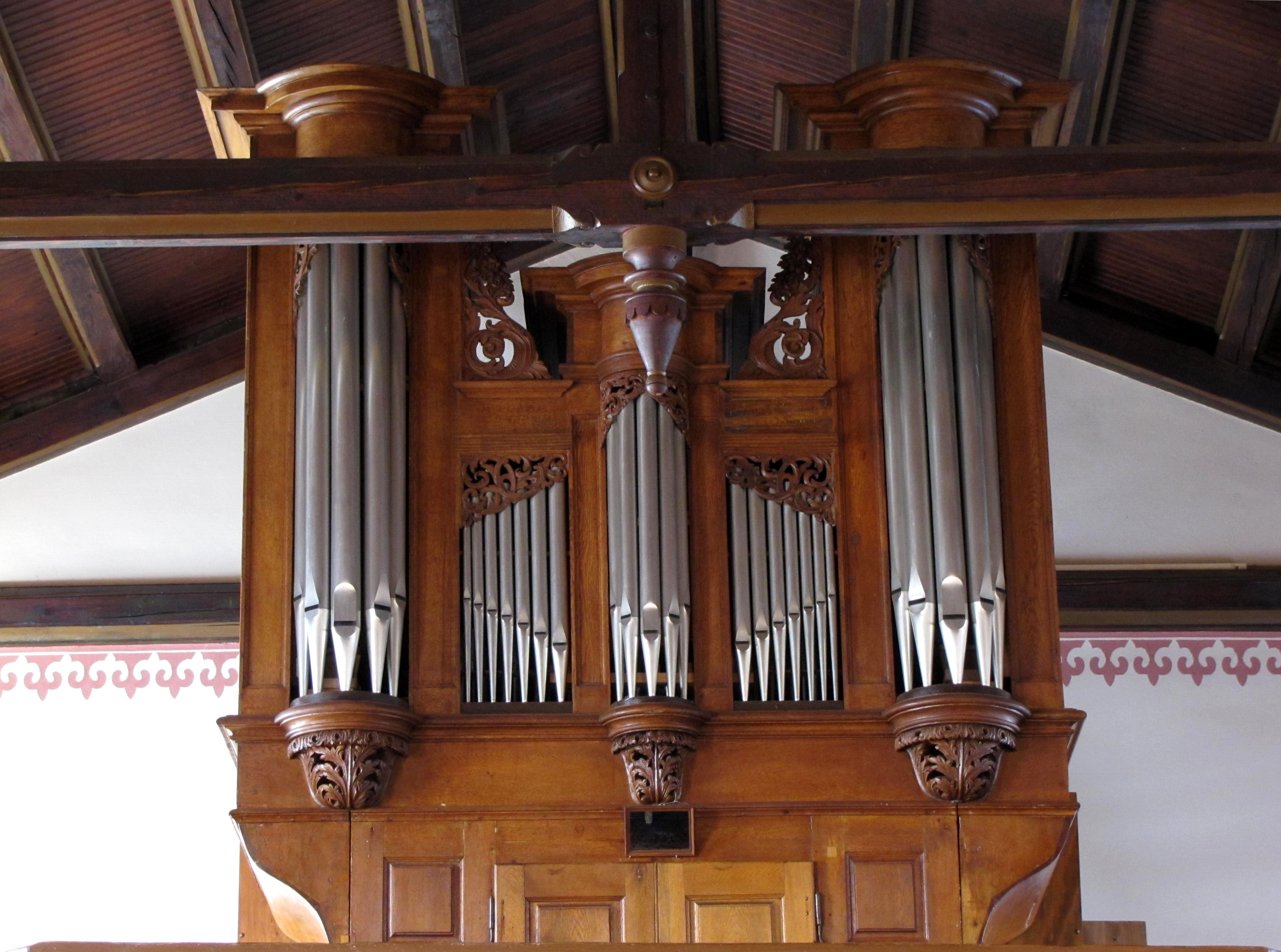
Alsace, Bas-Rhin, Lixhausen, Eglise Saint-Nabor, Merckel organ (eighteenth century)
