= Claude-François Clicquot =

French organ builder (1762–1801)

- Born: 1762; Paris
- Died: 29 March 1801 (aged 38–39); Paris
- Occupation: Organ builder
- Known for: Poitiers Cathedral Organ

Claude-François Clicquot (English: /kliːˈkoʊ/, French: [klod fʁɑ̃swa kliko]; 1762 – 29 March 1801) was a French organ-builder, son of the celebrated François-Henri Clicquot. During and after the French Revolution he saved many organs in Paris and in the provinces.

== Biography ==
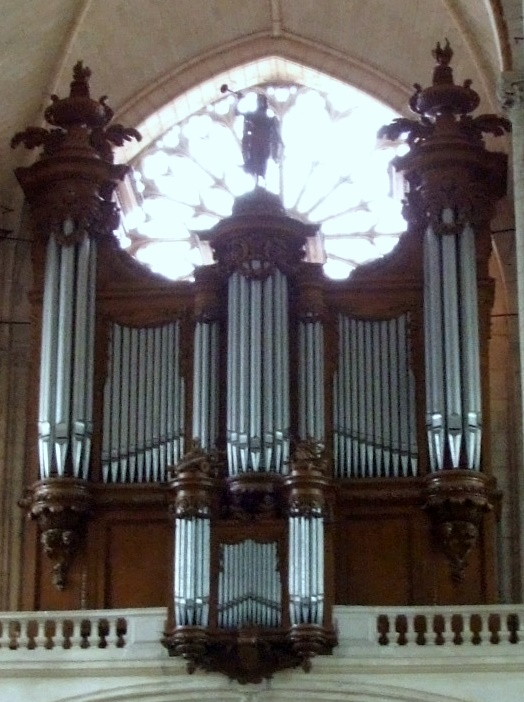
The organ of the Cathédrale Saint-Pierre de Poitiers, which Claude-François Clicquot helped his father to build

Claude-François Clicquot was born in Paris in 1762, son of the organ-builder François-Henri Clicquot (d. 1790) and Antoinette Poinsellier (d. 1796). He worked with his father on new organ construction. After his father's death, he mostly worked on restoring organs that had been damaged during the French Revolution. These included instruments at Saint-Eustache, Saint-Jacques-du-Haut-Pas and Saint-Merri.

Claude-François Clicquot completed a treatise on organ-building, Théorie pratique de la facture d’orgues, that his father had started. The thesis was based on the organ that he and his father built for Poitiers Cathedral, which is still almost intact today. He died in Paris on 29 March 1801.

== Work ==
=== Saint Merri, Paris ===
The organ case at Saint-Merry dates back to 1647, and was built by Germain Pilon. François-Henri and Claude-François Clicquot rebuilt the organ in 1778 and 1782. Claude-François undertook further work in 1791 after the death of his father. During the French Revolution (1789–1799) the church was used as a saltpeter factory, and from 1795 to 1801 was called the "Temple of Commerce". The instrument escaped looting. In 1796 the case was repaired by the organist Desprez, and in 1799 Claude-François restored it to working condition. A major overhaul was later undertaken by Aristide Cavaillé-Coll in 1857, but a large part of the Cliquot pipework remains.

=== Poitiers Cathedral ===
Claude-François Clicquot worked with his father on the organ for Poitiers Cathedral. The previous organ had been destroyed in a fire. François-Henri Clicquot, at that time the leading organ-builder in France, was appointed to create the new one, but died in Pentecost 1790 before completing the work. Claude-François Clicquot finished the job, handing it over for presentation in March 1791. The instrument is a beautiful example of eighteenth century organ design.

=== Saint-Jacques-du-Haut-Pas, Paris ===
The organ for the Saint-Benoît-le-Bétourné Collegiate was the work of Matthijs Langhedul. (Note: Saint-Benoît-le-Bétourné was razed in 1854 to make way for the new Sorbonne.) When that institution was secularized in 1792, its organ was transferred and installed in the Église Saint-Jacques-du-Haut-Pas by Claude-François Clicquot. The church was sacked in 1793, but was allowed to continue to be used as a place of worship. Between 1797 and 1801 the Catholics had to share the building with the Theophilanthropists, who occupied the choir as a "Temple of Benevolence". The organ later suffered from damage and renovations. It underwent extensive restoration by Alfred Kern & fils, completed in 1971.
