= Matthijs Langhedul =

Flemish organ builder

- Born: Flanders
- Died: c. 1636
- Occupation: Organ builder
- Known for: Organ in Saint Gervais, Paris

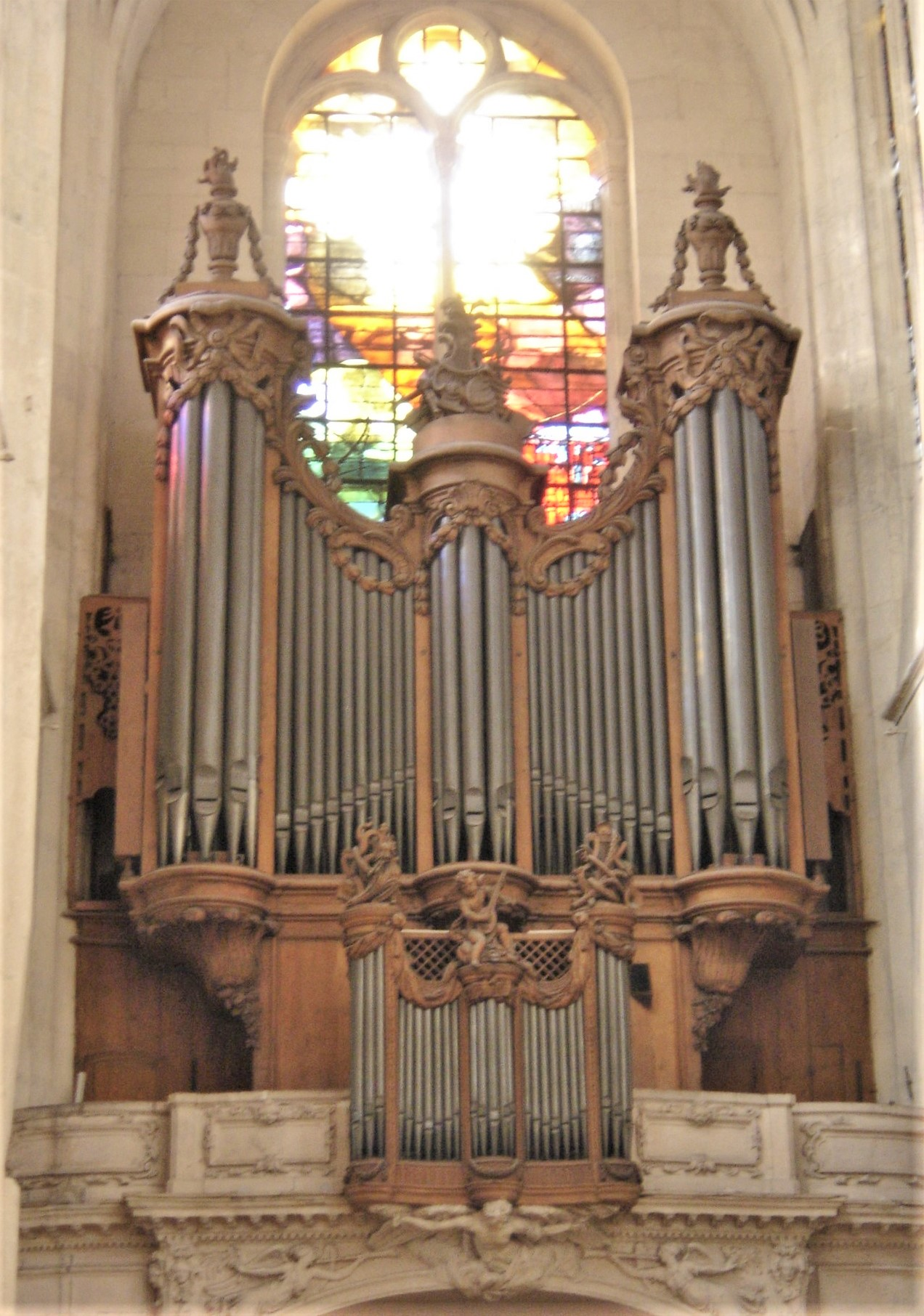
Organ in the Saint Gervais Church in Paris

Matthijs Langhedul (d. around 1636) was a Flemish organ-builder who did important work in Paris. He and Crespin Carlier had great influence on the development of the classical seventeenth century French organ.

== Early years ==
The family of Matthijs Langhedul was from Brabant, an organ-building dynasty founded by Victor Langhedul, who died around 1513. Victor's son Michiel Langhedul I built organs in England around 1530 and later in Flanders, living until at least 1570. Michiel's son Jan (or Jehan) moved to France, first to Lille and then to Paris in 1585 to escape from the ongoing fighting between the Dutch and Spanish. Jan Langhedul was given the title facteur d'orgues de Roy by King Henry III of France for the work he did in restoring the organ of Sainte-Chapelle in 1588.

Matthijs Langhedul was Jan Langhedul's son. (Note: One source say Matthijs was the third son of Michiel I rather than the son of Jan.) They moved to Paris around 1585 and worked on several organs. Jan Langhedul returned to Flanders while in 1592 Matthijs Langhedul obtained a position with the Spanish court. There he was court organist at El Escorial, and maintained four organs that had been built by his compatriot Jean Brebos. He held this position until 1599, when he returned to Paris. Before he left Madrid, the Archduke Albert made him a present of a large clavichord to which he had made various improvements.

== Paris ==
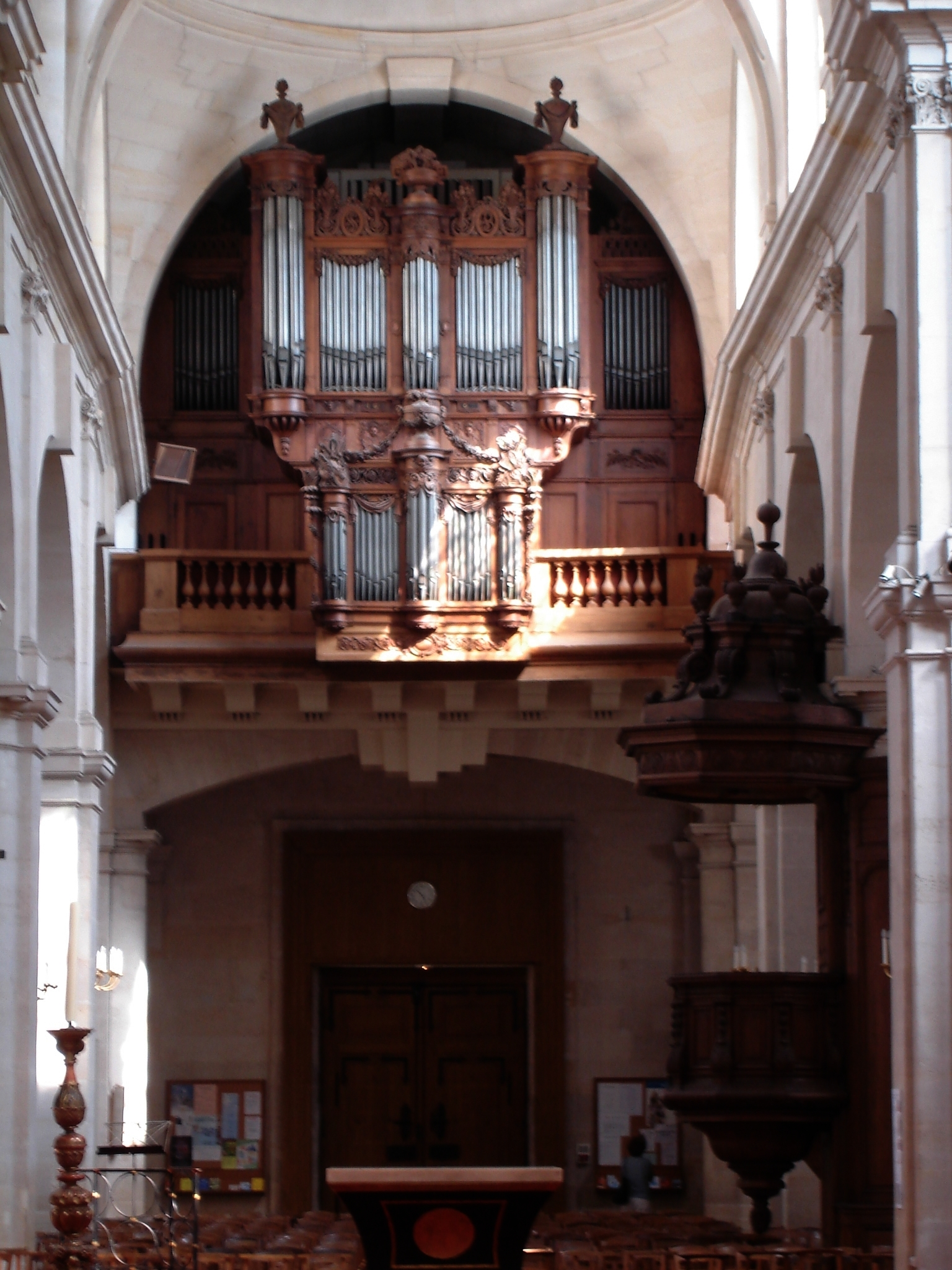
Main organ in the Église Saint-Jacques-du-Haut-Pas

Matthijs Langhedul was in demand in Paris to maintain the organs that he and his father had built or repaired. He restored the organs at Saint-Jean-en-Grève and Saint Benoit, where he replaced his father's spring-chest with a slider-chest to make repair easier. With an established reputation, he was asked to build or repair organs for the churches of Saints-Innocents and St Jacques-la-Boucherie. His most notable organ is the one built between 1599 and 1601 for Saint Gervais Church. Many of the original stops are still working. Some of the pipes are signed "Langhedul 1600". He made the organ for the Saint-Benoît-le-Bétourné Collegiate. (Note: Saint-Benoît-le-Bétourné was razed in 1854 to make way for the new Sorbonne.) When that institution was secularized in 1792, its organ was transferred and installed in the Église Saint-Jacques-du-Haut-Pas by Claude-François Clicquot. This organ underwent extensive restoration by Alfred Kern & fils, completed in 1971.

== Later work ==
Matthijs Langhedul was in Ypres in 1608. He made the organ of the collegiate church of Sainte Walburga in Veurne in 1611. It was rebuilt in 1859 by the Neuville de Rexpoëde brothers within Langhedul's original case, one of the oldest in Flanders. The rest of the instrument has almost all been lost.

In 1613 he was in Brussels, the official organ builder of Albert VII, Archduke of Austria and his consort Isabella Clara Eugenia. While in Brussels he worked on organs at Saint Gudula (1614), Begijnhof (1617), Hofkapel (1624–1625) and at the Notre Dame Cathedral in Saint-Omer. He built new instruments for the court in Madrid, for Anderlecht (from 1621) and for the Cathedral of Our Lady (Antwerp) (1618–1636). A design for an organ at the St. John's in 's-Hertogenbosch has been preserved. In 1624 Peter Philips joined him in Mechelen to help him repair the organ there. Matthijs worked with the English composer and organist John Bull in Antwerp between 1626 and 1627, where they built a ten-stop organ for the cathedral. The organ included Nasard, Tierce, Cornet and Trumpet stops.

There are no records of Matthijs Langhedul from 1636 onward. A stone from the Dominican church at Ghent mentions the burial in 1639 of a "M. Langhedal". Jan Langhedul had previously been buried there, so this may refer to Matthijs Langhedul.
