= Poitiers Cathedral =

- Poitiers Cathedral
- French: Cathédrale Saint-Pierre de Poitiers
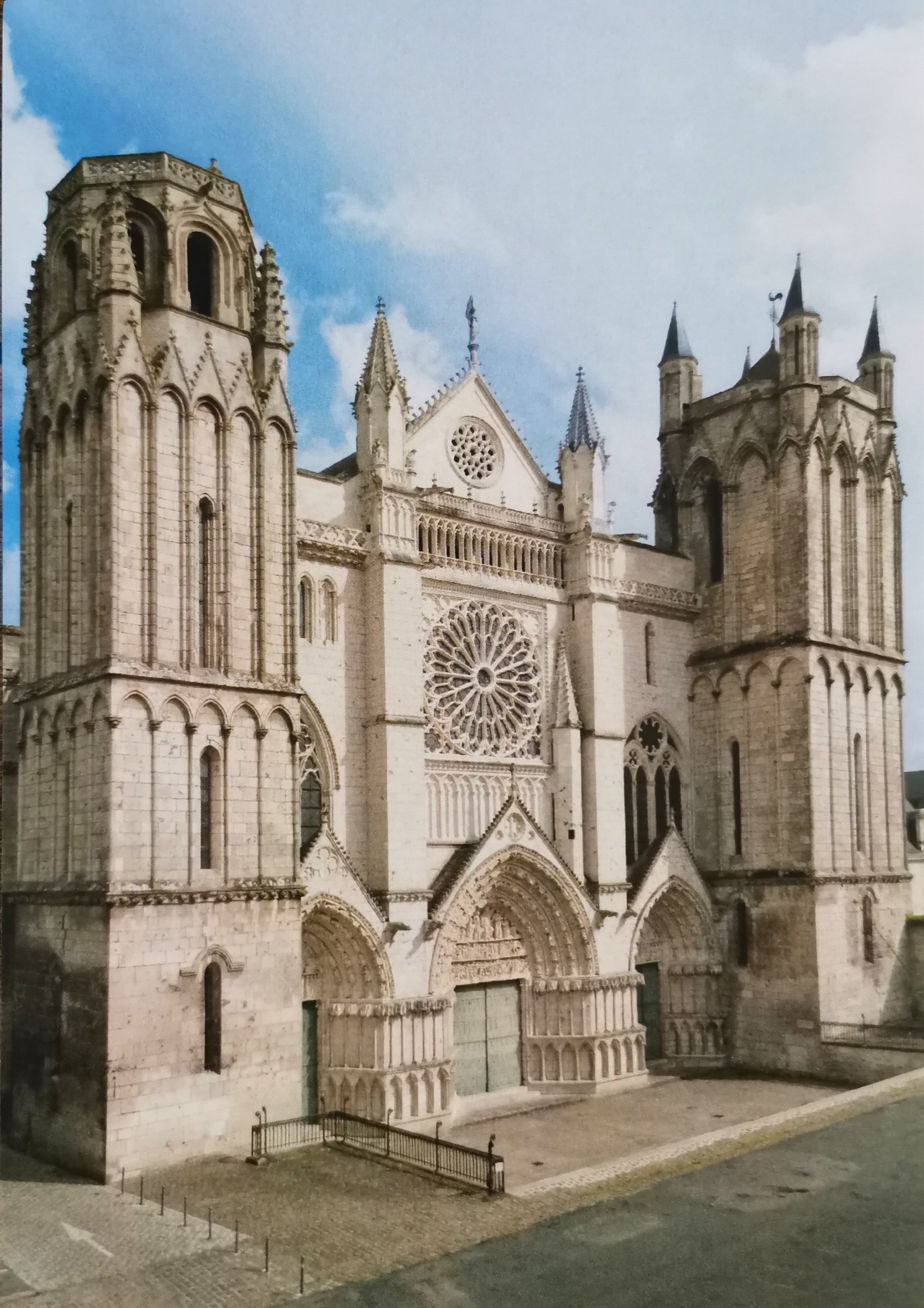
- Cathedral of St Peter in Poitiers
- Poitiers Cathedral
- 46.5803°N 0.3493°E
- Country: France
- Denomination: Roman Catholic

History
- Status: Cathedral

Architecture
- Functional status: Active

Administration
- Diocese: Poitiers

Clergy
- Archbishop: Jérôme Daniel Beau

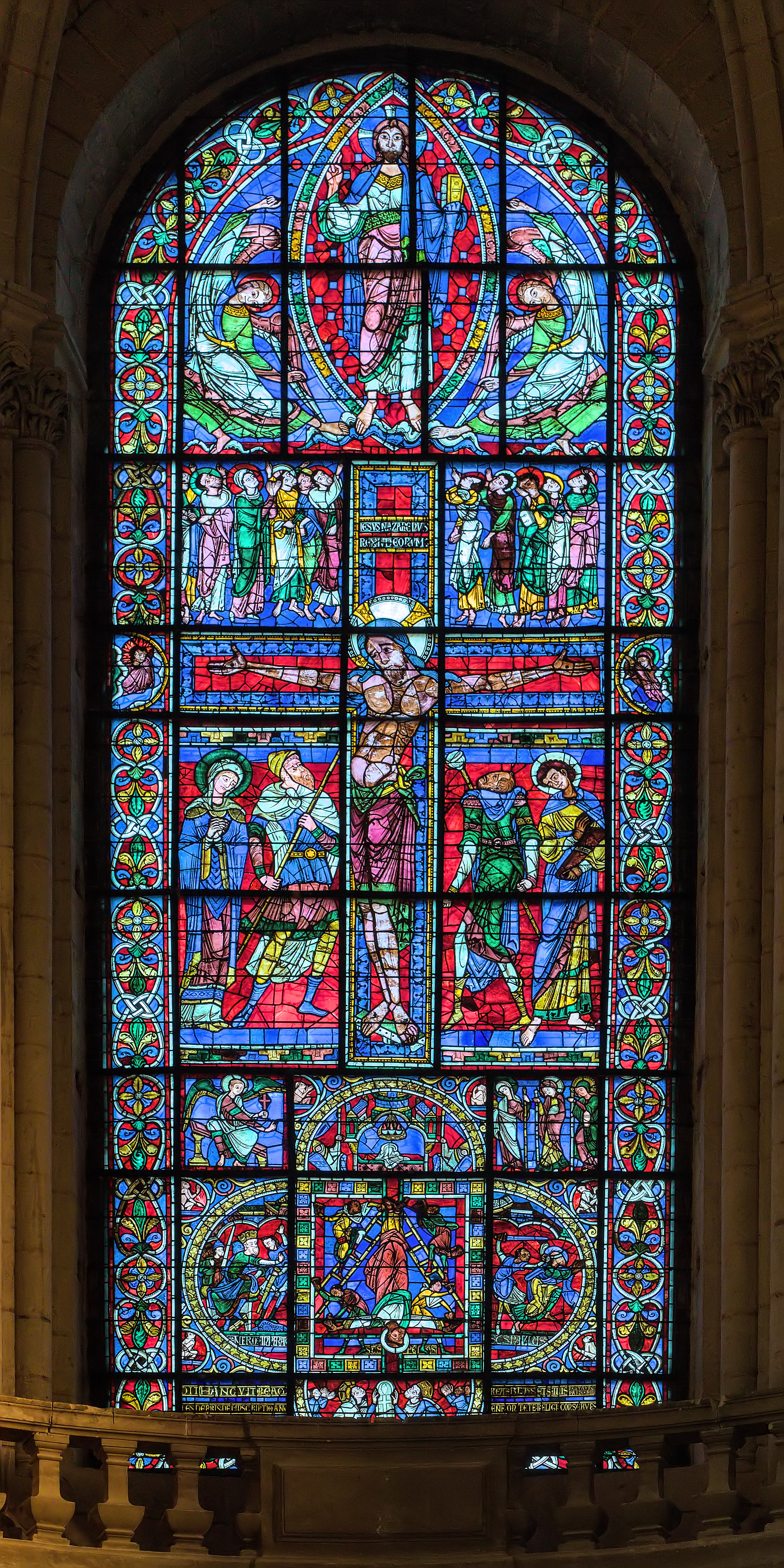
Crucifixion Window, Poitiers Cathedral, stained glass, 12th century. Given by Henry II and Queen Eleanor.

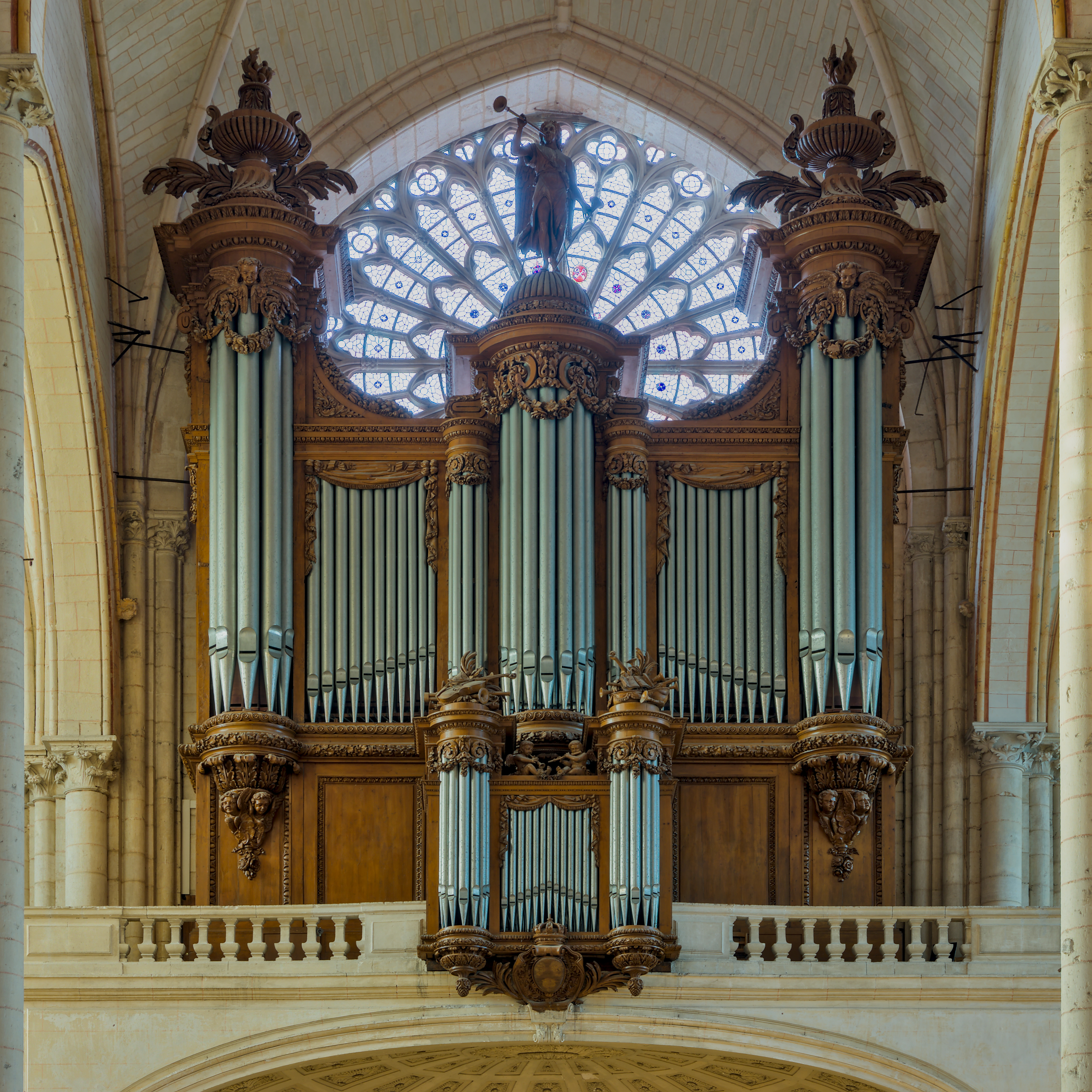
The organ of the Cathédrale Saint-Pierre de Poitiers, built by François-Henri Clicquot and Claude-François Clicquot

Poitiers Cathedral (French: Cathédrale Saint-Pierre de Poitiers) is a Roman Catholic church in Poitiers, France. It is the seat of the Archbishop of Poitiers. It is famous because of the romanesque Crucifixion Window, one of the earliest examples of stained glass in Europe, marked by its beautiful Chartres Blue elements.

== History ==
Its construction began in 1162 by Henry II of England and Eleanor of Aquitaine on the ruins of a Roman basilica, and work was well advanced by the end of the 12th century. It is the largest medieval monument in the city of Poitiers.

== Architecture ==
It is the best known example of a hall church of the Angevin Gothic style. It consists of a nave flanked on either side by an aisle. The nave and aisles are almost equal in height and width, all three of which decrease towards the west, thus enhancing the perspective. Its length is 308 feet (94 m), and the keystone of the central vaulted roof is 89 feet (27 m) above the pavement. The exterior generally has a heavy appearance. The facade, which is broad relative to its height, has unfinished side-towers 105 feet (32 m) and 110 feet (34 m) tall, begun in the 13th century. an Most of the windows of the choir and the transepts preserve their stained glass of the 12th and 13th centuries; the end window, the Crucifixion Window contains the figures of Henry II and Eleanor. It was completed in about 1165, making it one of the earliest stained-glass cathedral windows in France. The choir stalls, carved between 1235 and 1257, are also among the oldest in France.

The Crucifixion Window at Poitiers Cathedral depicts three stories in three registers of the lancet window. At the top of the window, in the lunette section, is a portrayal of the Ascension of Christ. Here, a bearded Christ appears in a mandorla with a cruciform halo, clothed in a white tunic with wine colored robes with a green border and a blue cloak. In his left hand he holds a yellow book and the right hand is upraised in benediction. On either side of the mandorla is an angel. Each angel raises one of their arms and contorts their bodies to fit and conform around the shape of the mandorla. Below the Ascension panel, but still included in the Ascension scene, are Christ's Apostles craning their necks to look upwards at the Ascension. In the middle section of the window is the Crucifixion panel. In this panel, an abstract, almost nude body of Christ appears nailed to a ruby red cross with a blue border. This representation of the Cross with a leaf border symbolizes the Tree of Paradise. Below the left arm of the cross on the outside appears the Virgin Mary. Here, she is dressed in blue and rose colored robes with her hands clasped at her breast and an expression of compassion on her face. Next to Mary is Longinus, a bearded Roman soldier dressed in a yellow cap and blue clothes. He hold a spear to Christ ready to plunge it into his side. Under the right arm of the cross, on the outer part of the window, appears St. John dressed in yellow clothes and a blue cloak carrying a jeweled book. Next to John is Sephaton, another Roman soldier ready to thrust upward a pole with a sponge. To the right and left of the arms of the Cross in the border appear figures of the sun with a halo of flames and the moon appearing out of green clouds holding a crescent moon in his hands. There is a use of a hierarchal scale in this window. Christ, being the most important figure is the largest, and in diminishing degrees of size and importance appear the Virgin, the Apostles, the centurion, and the sponge-bearer. The bottom register of the window includes a quatrefoil design with the crucifixion of Peter at the center. Here, Peter is being crucified upside down with Roman soldiers on ladders on either side of him. Peter asked to be crucified in this manner, as he did not feel worthy to die the same way as Christ. In the upper right panel outside of the quatrefoil are the three Marys coming with staffs and flacons of perfume. On the left upper panel is the Angel of Resurrection seated on a stone bench. In the lobes of the quatrefoil are scenes of Adam and Eve, Nero being crowned, Saint Paul about to be decapitated, and the bottom lobe, being the donor's lobe, shows King Henry II and Queen Eleanor of Aquitaine. Henry II and Queen Eleanor hold a model of the window. They look upwards to present the window to those that rank above them. The section that the royal couple holds is a 19th-century restoration. The quatrefoil panel as a whole represents the idea that Abbot Suger created at St. Denis. This bottom panel represents a link between the Crucifixion and the Ascension. There are stylistic identifications with the Ascension panel at Le Mans, the paintings at the Baptistry of St. Jean, and the remaining windows at the cathedral.

== Organ ==
On the night of 25 December 1681,← the organ was destroyed by fire. It was not until 1770-78 that a campaign was launched to build a replacement. François-Henri Clicquot, at that time the leading organ-builder in France, was appointed to undertake the work but died on Pentecost 1790 before completing the work. His son, Claude-François Clicquot, finished the job, handing it over for presentation in March 1791. The instrument is a beautiful example of eighteenth-century organ design, and is still largely intact.

== See also ==
- List of Gothic Cathedrals in Europe
