= Robert Clicquot =

French organ builder (1645–1719)

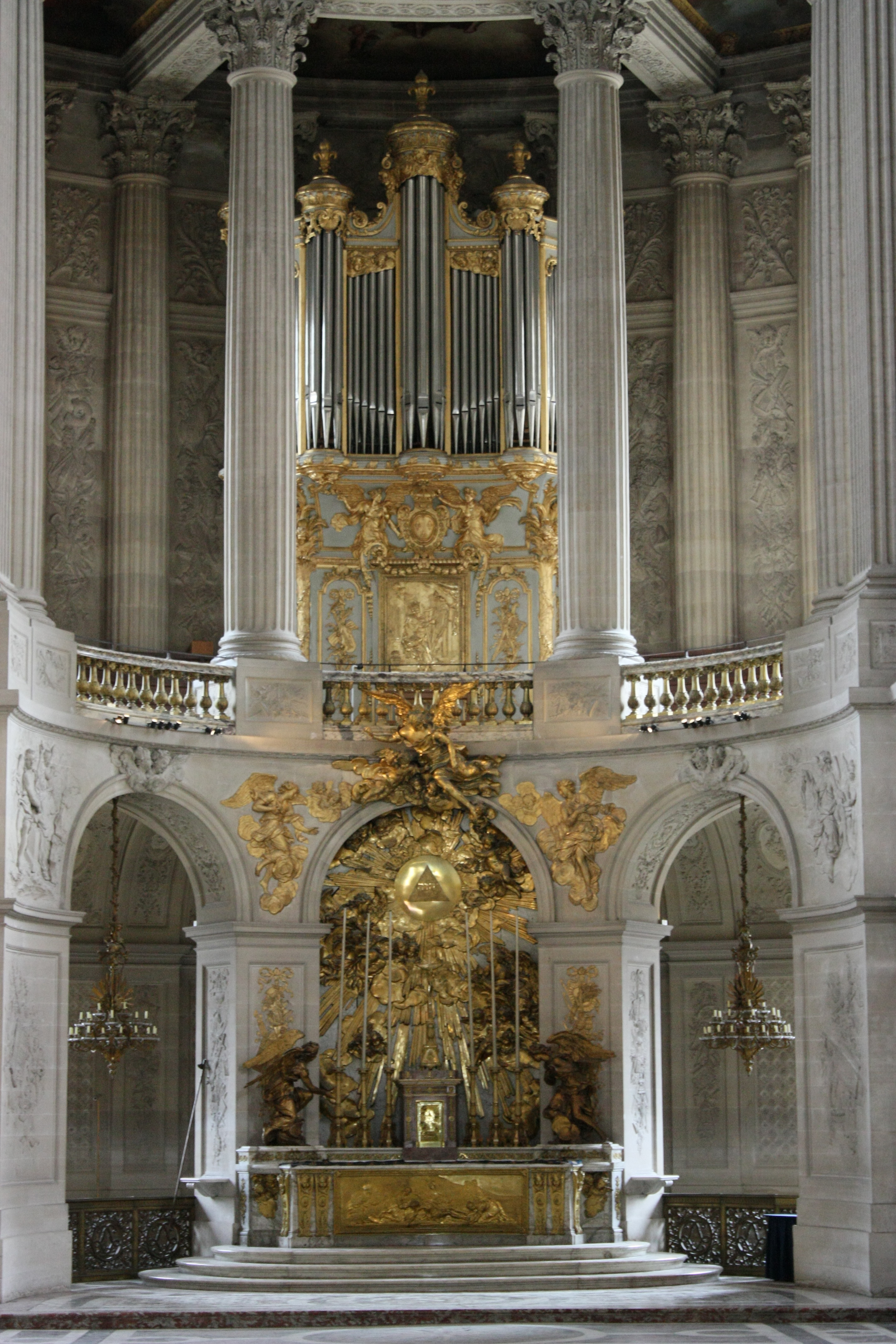
The notable Clicquot organ of the Versailles Chapel

Robert Clicquot (English: /kliːˈkoʊ/, French: [ʁɔbɛʁ kliko]; 1645–1719) was a French organ builder from Paris. His most notable organs are in the Chapel of the Palace of Versailles, the churches of Saint-Quentin and Saint-Louis des Invalides in Paris and Rouen Cathedral.

Clicquot's descendants continued in the family business. His son Louis-Alexandre built the organ of Rozay-en-Brie and in 1734 that of the Church of Saint-Jacques de Saint-Christopher Houdan which is the oldest organ in the Île-de-France still in operation. François-Henri Clicquot (1732–1790), Robert's grandson, built the monumental organ of Saint-Sulpice as well as those in Souvigny (1782) and in Poitiers Cathedral. His great-grandson Claude-François Clicquot (1762 - 1801) saved many organs during the French Revolution.
