= Pierre Thierry (organ builder) =

French organ builder (1604–1665)

- Born: 1604; Paris, France
- Died: 1665 (aged 60–61)
- Occupation: Organ builder

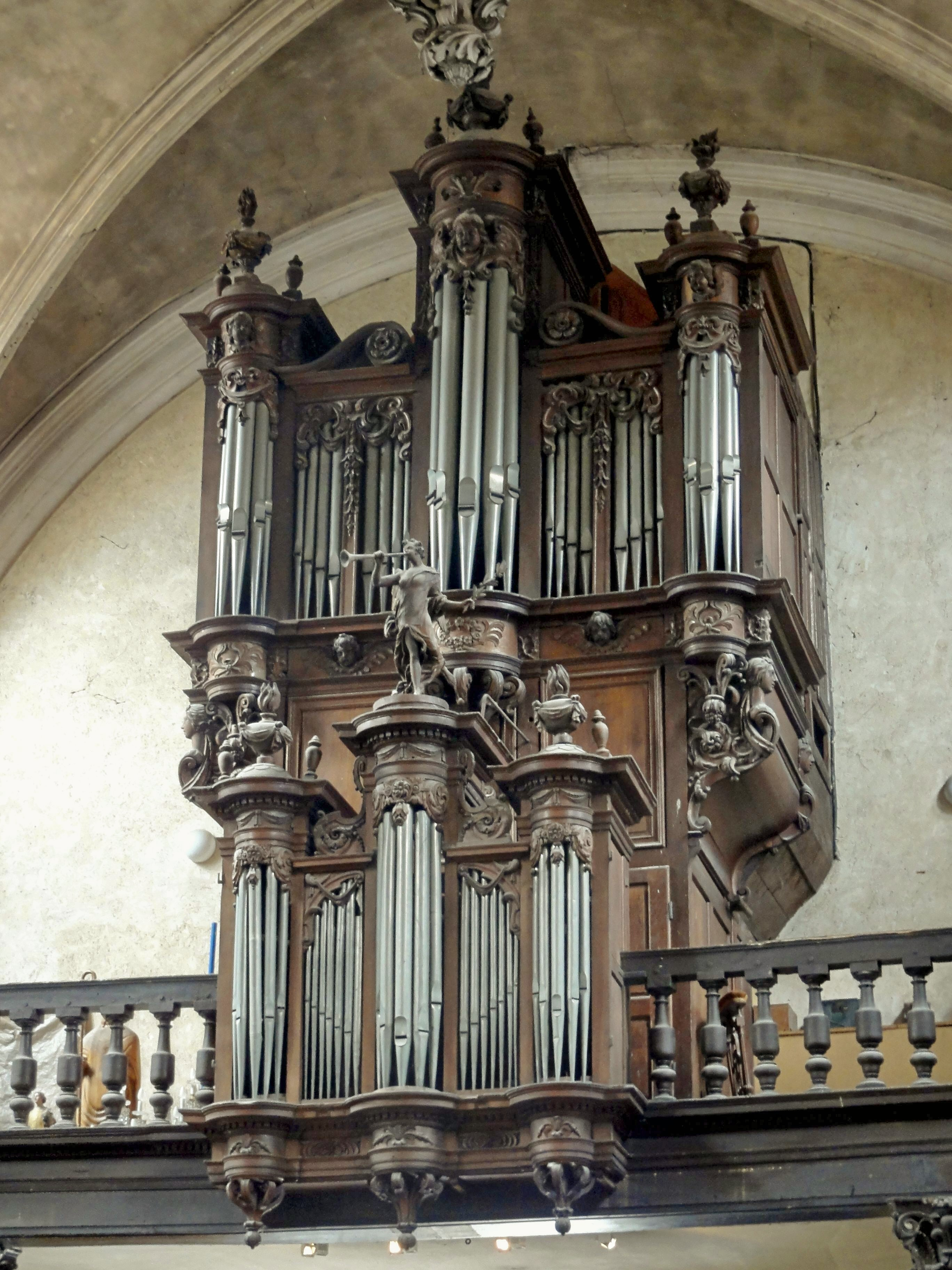
Grandstand organ from 1639, from the Hôtel-Dieu de Pontoise and originally built by Pierre Thierry.

Pierre Thierry (French pronunciation: [pjɛʁ tjɛʁi]; 1604–1665) was the founder of the Thierry dynasty of organ builders of Paris, France.

== Biography ==
Thierry was born in Paris. He was the son of a cobbler. At the age of seventeen he became a servant of the organist Florent Bienvenu. He apprenticed with the best known organists at that time, first Valéran de Héman and then Crespin Carlier, with whom he became a partner for a while. He assisted Carlier at Saint-Nicolas-des-Champs between 1634 and 1635, when he branched out on his own. In 1636 he married Marguerite Leclerc, sister of the organist at the Grands Augustins church. She gave him a son in 1642 who was named Charles in honor of his godfather, Charles Racquet, the famous organist of Notre Dame de Paris.

With the successive deaths or retirement of Crespin Carlier, Pierre Le Pescheur (1636) and Valéran de Héman (1641) Pierre Thierry became able to dominate the Parisian market. He worked in Paris at Notre Dame, Saint-Jean and Saint-Gervais, where he upgraded the organ in 1649 and again in 1661. His organ at Saint-Paul in Paris (1644-1646) combined the Flemish style that had become popular in northern France with the more modern French style. For almost forty years as a restorer, builder or expert, he fertilized organ building in Paris, earning the title of organ-builder to the king. He launched the organ-building careers of his sons Charles, Jean (who made pipes in their workshop), and especially Alexandre Thierry, the most gifted and best able to take over direction of the family firm after the death of their father. The dynasty would continue into a third generation with François Thierry, son of Jean.

== Works ==
Works that have been identified as his include the organs at:

- Saint-Jacques de la Boucherie, Paris
- Notre Dame de Paris in 1636 and 1648
- Saint-Germain l'Auxerrois in 1638
- St-Martin-des-Champs Priory in 1642
- Paroisse royale Saint-Paul-des-Champs (destroyed in 1796) between 1644 and 1645
- Saint-Jacques-de-l’Hôpital-des-Pélerins
- Saint-Séverin, Paris
- Saint-Jean-en-Grève (destroyed in 1797)
- Saint-Germain-le-Vieil (destroyed in the French Revolution)
- Saint-Nicholas-des-Champs, Paris
- St-Gervais-et-St-Protais in 1649 and 1659
- Les Mathurins (destroyed in the Révolution)
- Saint-André-des-Arts (destroyed in 1808)
- Saint-Sulpice, Paris in 1662
- Pontoise Hôtel-Dieu (destroyed during the Second World War) in 1637, 1640, 1654
- Rouen Cathedral in 1657 in association with Pierre Desenclos

His masterpiece was the organ at the Abbey of Saint-Germain-des-Prés, undertaken between 1661 and 1664. He had to leave it to his sons, Jean and Alexandre, to finish this project.
