= François-Henri Clicquot =

French organ builder (1732–1790)

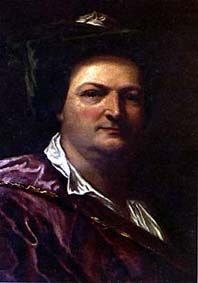
François-Henry Clicquot.

François-Henri (also Henry) Clicquot (English: /kliːˈkoʊ/, French: [fʁɑ̃swa ɑ̃ʁi kliko]; 1732 – 24 May 1790) was a French organ builder and was the grandson of Robert Clicquot and son of Louis-Alexandre Cliquot, who were also noted organ builders.

Clicquot was born in Paris, where he later died.

The Clicquot firm installed the first noteworthy organ in the cathedral of Notre-Dame de Paris. Though extensively rebuilt and expanded in the nineteenth century by Aristide Cavaillé-Coll, some of the original Clicquot pipework was reused, notably in the pedal division of that instrument, where it continues to be heard today. Upon the death of Louis-Alexandre, François-Henri inherited his father's workshop.

Other Clicquot organs survive in Saint-Gervais-Saint-Protais, St. Sulpice (rebuilt by Aristide Cavaille-Coll), St. Nicolas-des-Champs, Souvigny Priory, and the Palace of Fontainebleau.

Clicquot died during the construction of organs in Poitiers Cathedral and the church of Saint-Germain l'Auxerrois, both of which were completed by his son Claude-François Clicquot.
