= Results of the 2024 French legislative election in Vosges =

Following the first round of the 2024 French legislative election on 30 June 2024, runoff elections in each constituency where no candidate received a vote share greater than 50 percent were scheduled for 7 July. Candidates permitted to stand in the runoff elections needed to either come in first or second place in the first round or achieve more than 12.5 percent of the votes of the entire electorate (as opposed to 12.5 percent of the vote share due to low turnout).

== Vosges ==
=== 1st constituency ===
Candidate	Party or alliance		First round		Second round	
Candidate	Party or alliance		Votes	%	Votes	%
Stéphane Viry	Miscellaneous right	The Republicans	21,200	42.85	29,263	58.73
Pierre François	National Rally		18,886	38.17	20,567	41.27
Dominique Perrin	New Popular Front	La France Insoumise	8,655	17.49		
Evelyne Abbot	Far-left	Lutte Ouvrière	737	1.49		
Total			49,478	100.00	49,830	100.00
Valid votes			49,478	97.50	49,830	96.93
Invalid votes			508	1.00	473	0.92
Blank votes			761	1.50	1,105	2.15
Total votes			50,747	100.00	51,408	100.00
Registered voters/turnout			75,984	66.79	75,983	67.66

=== 2nd constituency ===
Candidate	Party or alliance		First round		Second round	
Candidate	Party or alliance		Votes	%	Votes	%
Gaëtan Dussausaye	National Rally		22,788	48.16	25,048	52.77
David Valence	Ensemble	Radical Party	14,592	30.84	22,422	47.23
Julie Xicola	New Popular Front	La France Insoumise	7,312	15.45		
Emma Gateau	The Republicans		1,202	2.54		
Emmanuel Thiébaut	Miscellaneous centre	Independent	925	1.95		
Jeanne-Françoise Langlade	Far-left	Lutte Ouvrière	486	1.03		
Lionel Chambrot	Ecologists	Independent	10	0.02		
Total			47,315	100.00	47,470	100.00
Valid votes			47,315	97.31	47,470	95.65
Invalid votes			458	0.94	664	1.34
Blank votes			850	1.75	1,494	3.01
Total votes			48,623	100.00	49,628	100.00
Registered voters/turnout			71,896	67.63	71,910	69.01

=== 3rd constituency ===
Candidate	Party or alliance		First round		Second round	
Candidate	Party or alliance		Votes	%	Votes	%
Christophe Naegelen	Miscellaneous right	Union of Democrats and Independents	20,652	48.33	27,341	64.67
Pauline Fresse	National Rally		14,287	33.43	14,934	35.33
Etienne Bachelart	New Popular Front	Socialist Party	7,283	17.04		
Stéphanie Bailly	Far-left	Lutte Ouvrière	511	1.20		
Total			42,733	100.00	42,275	100.00
Valid votes			42,733	98.14	42,275	97.14
Invalid votes			267	0.61	388	0.89
Blank votes			543	1.25	858	1.97
Total votes			43,543	100.00	43,521	100.00
Registered voters/turnout			63,350	68.73	63,361	68.69

=== 4th constituency ===
Candidate	Party or alliance		First round		Second round	
Candidate	Party or alliance		Votes	%	Votes	%
Sébastien Humbert	National Rally		20,529	48.02	22,797	53.18
Jean-Jacques Gaultier	The Republicans		13,644	31.91	20,073	46.82
François-Xavier Wein	New Popular Front	La France Insoumise	6,851	16.02		
Camille Bailly	Far-left	Lutte Ouvrière	674	1.58		
Caroline Hubert	Reconquête		538	1.26		
Marie Beni	Miscellaneous centre	Union of Democrats and Independents	519	1.21		
Total			42,755	100.00	42,870	100.00
Valid votes			42,755	96.63	42,870	95.20
Invalid votes			471	1.06	687	1.53
Blank votes			1,019	2.30	1,475	3.28
Total votes			44,245	100.00	45,032	100.00
Registered voters/turnout			64,121	69.00	64,121	70.23
