= Vosges's 3rd constituency =

Constituency of the National Assembly of France

3rd constituency of the Vosges
- inline Constituency of the National Assembly of France

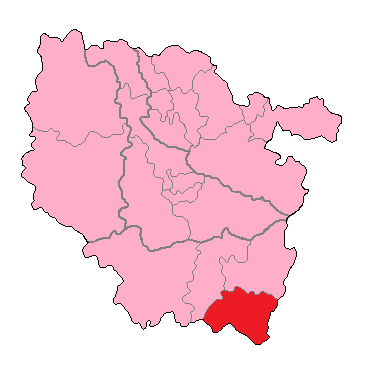
- Vosges' 3rd Constituency shown within Lorraine
- Deputy: Christophe Naegelen; UDI
- Department: Vosges
- Cantons: Gérardmer, Plombières-les-Bains, Remiremont, Saulxures-sur-Moselotte, Le Thillot.
- Registered voters: 66,793

The 3rd constituency of the Vosges is a French legislative constituency in the Vosges département.

== Description ==
The 3rd constituency of Vosges covers the south-eastern section of the Department, bordering Alsace to the east and Franche-Comté to the south. It includes the western Vosges mountains and a number of small towns and villages including Remiremont.

It has elected members of the National Assembly from the Gaullist right throughout the Fifth Republic apart from in the Socialist landslide of 1981.

== Historic representation ==
Election	Member	Party
1958	Jean-Marie Grenier	UNR
1962	Christian Poncelet	UNR
1967	Christian Poncelet	UDR
1968	Christian Poncelet	UDR
1973	Christian Poncelet	UDR
1978	Gérard Braun	RPR
1981	Jean Valroff	PS
1986	Proportional representation – no election by constituency	
1988	Christian Spiller	DVD
1993	François Vannson	RPR
1997	François Vannson	RPR
2002	François Vannson	UMP
2007	François Vannson	UMP
2012	François Vannson	UMP
2017	Christophe Naegelen	DVD
2022	Christophe Naegelen	UDI

== Election results ==
=== 2024 ===
-->

Legislative Election 2024: Vosges's 3rd constituency
Party	Candidate	Votes	%	±%
LO	Stéphanie Bailly	511	1.20	n/a
UDI	Christophe Naegelen	20,652	48.33	+1.13
PS (NFP)	Etienne Bachelart	7,283	17.04	n/a
RN	Pauline Fresse	14,287	33.43	+15.33
Turnout		42,733	98.14	+47.17
Registered electors		63,350		
2nd round result
UDI	Christophe Naegelen	27,341	64.67	−9.60
RN	Pauline Fresse	14,934	35.33	+9.60
Turnout		42,275	97.14	+50.66
Registered electors		63,361		
UDI hold				

=== 2022 ===
Legislative Election 2022: Vosges's 3rd constituency
Party	Candidate	Votes	%	±%
UDI (UDC)	Christophe Naegelen	15,135	47.20	+18.15
RN	Pierre François	5,805	18.10	+4.02
EELV (NUPÉS)	Béatrice Pierrat	5,669	17.68	−5.59
LREM (Ensemble)	Stéphanie Villemin	3,758	11.72	−15.25
REC	Anne-Caroline Erb	721	2.25	N/A
Others	N/A	975	-	−
Turnout		32,063	50.97	+1.04
2nd round result
UDI (UDC)	Christophe Naegelen	21,035	74.27	+13.56
RN	Pierre François	7,288	25.73	N/A
Turnout		28,323	46.48	+4.97
UDI hold				

=== 2017 ===
Legislative Election 2017: Vosges's 3rd constituency
Party	Candidate	Votes	%	±%
DVD	Christophe Naegelen	9,521	29.05	
LREM	Claude Thirard	8,841	26.97	
FN	Marina Do Santos	4,617	14.08	
PS	Stessy Speissmann	4,300	13.12	
LFI	Christine Bourbon-Schmitt	2,864	8.74	
DLF	Léa Grunenwald	922	2.81	
Others	N/A	1,715		
Turnout		32,780	49.93	
2nd round result
DVD	Christophe Naegelen	16,547	60.71	
LREM	Claude Thirard	10,707	39.29	
Turnout		27,254	41.51	
DVD gain from LR				

=== 2012 ===
Legislative Election 2012: Vosges's 3rd constituency
Party	Candidate	Votes	%	±%
UMP	François Vannson	16,408	40.63	
PS	Elise Calais	13,943	34.52	
FN	Rachel Sembach	5,785	14.32	
FG	Dominique Cholez	1,294	3.20	
Others	N/A	2,956		
Turnout		40,386	60.46	
2nd round result
UMP	François Vannson	20,742	52.69	
PS	Elise Calais	18,622	47.31	
Turnout		39,364	58.93	
UMP hold				

=== 2007 ===
Legislative Election 2007: Vosges's 3rd constituency
Party	Candidate	Votes	%	±%
UMP	François Vannson	21,930	53.70	
PS	Jacqueline Bedez-Stouvenel	6,607	16.18	
DVG	Gilbert Poirot	2,695	6.60	
MoDem	Gerard Michel	2,414	5.91	
FN	Chantal Ferry-Vuillemin	2,263	5.54	
LV	Jean-François Fleck	1,944	4.76	
Far left	Eric Defranould	1,625	3.98	
Others	N/A	1,360		
Turnout		41,802	61.94	
UMP hold				

=== 2002 ===
Legislative Election 2002: Vosges's 3rd constituency
Party	Candidate	Votes	%	±%
DVD	François Vannson	16,032	37.22	
PS	Guy Vaxelaire	12,641	29.35	
UMP	Jean Paul Didier	6,375	14.80	
FN	Madeleine Mathieu	4,602	10.68	
LCR	Eric Defranould	1,104	2.56	
Others	N/A	2,320		
Turnout		44,096	66.64	
2nd round result
DVD	François Vannson	23,815	58.98	
PS	Guy Vaxelaire	16,560	41.02	
Turnout		41,742	63.08	
DVD gain from RPR				

=== 1997 ===
Legislative Election 1997: Vosges's 3rd constituency
Party	Candidate	Votes	%	±%
RPR	François Vannson	14,316	33.72	
PS	Guy Vaxelaire	12,607	29.70	
FN	Jean-Yves Douissard	7,866	18.53	
LV	Jean-François Fleck	1,776	4.18	
DVD	Bernard Mire	1,620	3.82	
PCF	Serge Ragot	1,576	3.71	
LCR	Eric Defranould	1,385	3.26	
DVE	Madeleine Pinot	1,054	2.48	
Others	N/A	252		
Turnout		45,611	70.86	
2nd round result
RPR	François Vannson	22,799	50.86	
PS	Guy Vaxelaire	22,028	49.14	
Turnout		48,068	74.68	
RPR hold				

== Sources ==
Official results of French elections from 2002: "Résultats électoraux officiels en France" (in French).
