= Gérard Cherpion =

French politician

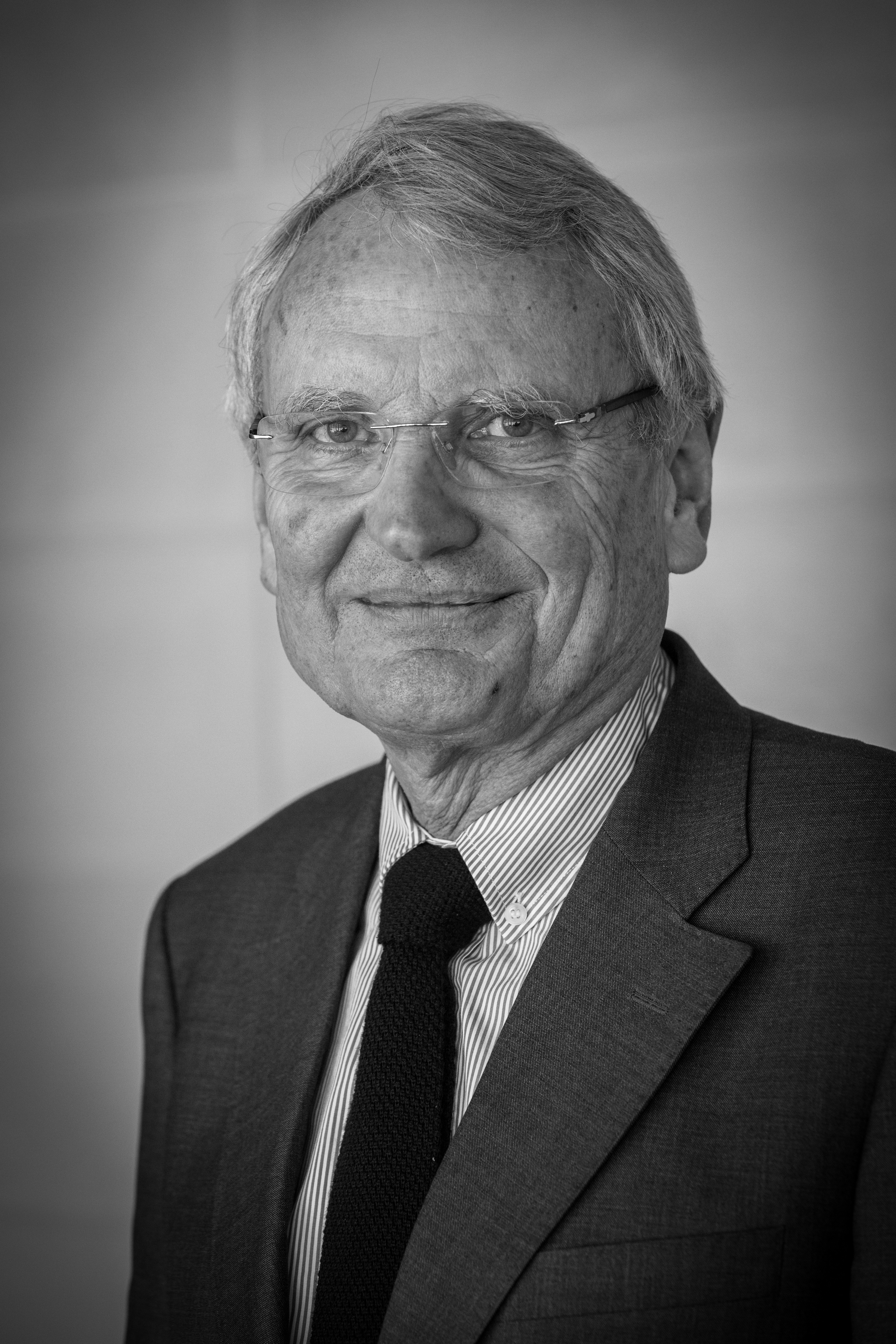
- Gérard Cherpion in 2016

Member of the National Assembly for Vosges's 2nd constituency
- In office 19 June 2002 – 21 June 2022
- Preceded by: Claude Jacquot
- Succeeded by: David Valence

Personal details
- Born: 15 March 1948 (age 78) Dombasle-sur-Meurthe, France
- Party: UMP; The Republicans
- Education: Nancy University
- Profession: Pharmacist

Gérard Cherpion (French pronunciation: [ʒeʁaʁ ʃɛʁpjɔ̃]; born 15 March 1948) is a member of the National Assembly of France. He represents the Vosges's 2nd constituency, and is a member of the Republicans.

On 24 February 2022, he announced he would stand down at the 2022 French legislative election.
