= Vosges's 1st constituency =

Constituency of the National Assembly of France

1st constituency of the Vosges
- inline Constituency of the National Assembly of France

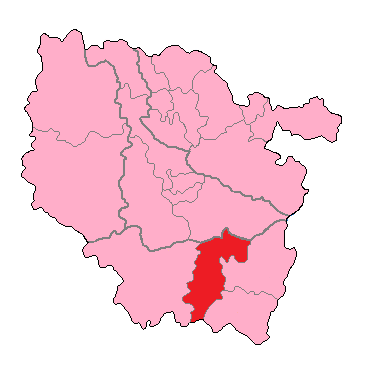
- Vosges' 1st Constituency shown within Lorraine
- Deputy: Stéphane Viry; LR
- Department: Vosges
- Cantons: Châtel-sur-Moselle, Épinal-Est, Épinal-Ouest, Rambervillers, Xertigny
- Registered voters: 76,604

The 1st constituency of the Vosges is a French legislative constituency in the Vosges département.

== Description ==
The 1st Constituency of Vosges forms a band of territory running through the centre of the Department from north to south. It includes the Department's Prefecture and largest town Épinal.

Politically the constituency has been dominated by Gaullist parties since the beginning of the Fifth Republic. Michel Heinrich, the Mayor of Épinal, held the seat between 2002 and 2017 on behalf of the UMP.

== Historic representation ==
| Election | Member | Party |
|---|---|---|
| 1958 | Charles Guthmuller | PR |
| 1962 | Marcel Hoffer | UNR |
| 1967 | Marcel Hoffer | UDR |
| 1968 | Marcel Hoffer | UDR |
| 1973 | Marcel Hoffer | UDR |
| 1978 | Philippe Séguin | RPR |
| 1981 | Philippe Séguin | RPR |
| 1986 | Proportional representation – no election by constituency | |
| 1988 | Philippe Séguin | RPR |
| 1993 | Philippe Séguin | RPR |
| 1997 | Philippe Séguin | RPR |
| 2002 | Michel Heinrich | UMP |
| 2007 | Michel Heinrich | UMP |
| 2012 | Michel Heinrich | UMP |
| 2017 | Stéphane Viry | LR |
| 2022 | Stéphane Viry | LR |

== Election results ==
=== 2024 ===
Legislative Election 2024: Vosges's 1st constituency
| Party | Candidate | Votes | % | ±% |
|---|---|---|---|---|
| LFI (NFP) | Dominique Perrin | 8,655 | 17.49 | −1.13 |
| RN | Pierre François | 18,886 | 38.17 | +17.66 |
| LR | Stéphane Viry | 21,200 | 42.85 | +5.64 |
| LO | Evelyne Abbot | 737 | 1.49 | n/a |
| Turnout | | 49,478 | 97.50 | +50.00 |
| Registered electors | | 75,984 | | |
2nd round result
| LR | Stéphane Viry | 29,263 | 58.73 | −8.50 |
| RN | Pierre François | 20,567 | 41.27 | +8.50 |
| Turnout | | 49,830 | 96.93 | +52.76 |
| Registered electors | | 75,983 | | |
| LR hold | | | | |

=== 2022 ===
Legislative Election 2022: Vosges's 1st constituency
| Party | Candidate | Votes | % | ±% |
|---|---|---|---|---|
| LR (UDC) | Stéphane Viry | 13,275 | 37.21 | +11.17 |
| RN | Emmie Moons | 7,316 | 20.51 | +6.03 |
| LFI (NUPÉS) | Jules Fetet | 6,643 | 18.62 | +0.65 |
| LREM (Ensemble) | Anne-Sophie Monange | 5,439 | 15.24 | −16.69 |
| REC | Stéphane Perry | 1,205 | 3.38 | N/A |
| Others | N/A | 1,801 | - | − |
| Turnout | | 35,679 | 47.50 | −0.57 |
2nd round result
| LR (UDC) | Stéphane Viry | 21,445 | 67.23 | +14.11 |
| RN | Emmie Moons | 10,453 | 32.77 | N/A |
| Turnout | | 31,898 | 44.17 | +4.26 |
| LR hold | | | | |

=== 2017 ===
Legislative Election 2017: Vosges's 1st constituency
| Party | Candidate | Votes | % | ±% |
|---|---|---|---|---|
| LREM | Alisson Hamelin | 11,826 | 31.93 | |
| LR | Stéphane Viry | 9,646 | 26.04 | |
| FN | Sébastien Humbert | 5,362 | 14.48 | |
| LFI | Fabrice Pisias | 4,110 | 11.10 | |
| PS | Martine Fancois | 1,376 | 3.72 | |
| DLF | Pierre-Jean Robinot | 1,363 | 3.68 | |
| EELV | Lou Noirclere | 871 | 2.35 | |
| Others | N/A | 2,483 | | |
| Turnout | | 37,037 | 48.07 | |
2nd round result
| LR | Stéphane Viry | 16,340 | 53.12 | |
| LREM | Alisson Hamelin | 14,423 | 46.88 | |
| Turnout | | 30,763 | 39.91 | |
| LR hold | | | | |

=== 2012 ===
Legislative Election 2012: Vosges's 1st constituency
| Party | Candidate | Votes | % | ±% |
|---|---|---|---|---|
| UMP | Michel Heinrich | 18,276 | 41.51 | |
| DVG | François-Xavier Huguenot | 8,948 | 20.32 | |
| FN | Jordan Grosse-Cruciani | 6,709 | 15.24 | |
| EELV | Gilles Bilot | 6,024 | 13.68 | |
| FG | Vincent Gehin | 2,069 | 4.70 | |
| Others | N/A | 2,007 | | |
| Turnout | | 44,033 | 57.48 | |
2nd round result
| UMP | Michel Heinrich | 23,246 | 56.74 | |
| DVG | François-Xavier Huguenot | 17,720 | 43.26 | |
| Turnout | | 40,966 | 53.48 | |
| UMP hold | | | | |

=== 2007 ===
Legislative Election 2007: Vosges's 1st constituency
| Party | Candidate | Votes | % | ±% |
|---|---|---|---|---|
| UMP | Michel Heinrich | 23,344 | 53.15 | |
| PS | Marie-France Glaudel | 10,075 | 22.94 | |
| MoDem | Nathalie Mercier | 3,685 | 8.39 | |
| FN | François Ferrier | 2,838 | 6.46 | |
| Far left | Raphaël Pecheur | 1,427 | 3.25 | |
| Others | N/A | 2,551 | | |
| Turnout | | 45,037 | 58.54 | |
| UMP hold | | | | |

=== 2002 ===
Legislative Election 2002: Vosges's 1st constituency
| Party | Candidate | Votes | % | ±% |
|---|---|---|---|---|
| UMP | Michel Heinrich | 22,099 | 48.58 | |
| PS | Gérard Welzer | 11,728 | 25.78 | |
| FN | Christine Marthelot | 4,935 | 10.85 | |
| LV | Odile Delhaye-Marche | 1,407 | 3.09 | |
| PR | Serge Thibers | 1,102 | 2.42 | |
| Others | N/A | 4,222 | | |
| Turnout | | 46,835 | 62.08 | |
2nd round result
| UMP | Michel Heinrich | 25,628 | 61.81 | |
| PS | Gérard Welzer | 15,835 | 38.19 | |
| Turnout | | 43,549 | 57.74 | |
| UMP hold | | | | |

=== 1997 ===
Legislative Election 1997: Vosges's 1st constituency
| Party | Candidate | Votes | % | ±% |
|---|---|---|---|---|
| RPR | Philippe Séguin | 21,603 | 44.59 | |
| PS | Gérard Welzer | 11,744 | 24.24 | |
| FN | Bernard Freppel | 7,393 | 15.26 | |
| LV | Jean-Paul Deltour | 2,557 | 5.28 | |
| PCF | Odile Martin | 1,852 | 3.82 | |
| LO | Jeanne Poissenot | 1,310 | 2.70 | |
| DVD | Jean-Claude Weber | 1,021 | 2.11 | |
| Others | N/A | 969 | | |
| Turnout | | 51,126 | 70.58 | |
2nd round result
| RPR | Philippe Séguin | 28,101 | 56.44 | |
| PS | Gérard Welzer | 21,687 | 43.56 | |
| Turnout | | 53,007 | 73.18 | |
| RPR hold | | | | |

== Sources ==
Official results of French elections from 2002: "Résultats électoraux officiels en France" (in French).
