= Vosges's 4th constituency =

Constituency of the National Assembly of France

4th constituency of the Vosges
- inline Constituency of the National Assembly of France

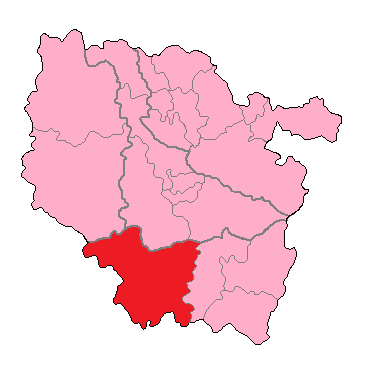
- Vosges' 4th Constituency shown within Lorraine
- Deputy: Sébastien Humbert; RN
- Department: Vosges
- Cantons: Bains-les-Bains, Bulgnéville, Charmes, Châtenois, Coussey, Darney, Dompaire, Lamarche, Mirecourt, Monthureux-sur-Saône, Neufchâteau, Vittel
- Registered voters: 67,893

The 4th constituency of the Vosges is a French legislative constituency in the Vosges département.

== Description ==
Vosges' 4th Constituency covers the western portion of the Department. It has the town of Neufchâteau at its north western corner and stretches as far as the village Bains-les-Bains close to Épinal in the centre of the Department.

Politically the seat has historically swung between the left, right and centre. The PS captured the seat with the slender margin of only 276 votes at the 2012 election. This result made it the only Socialist held seat in Vosges, before the seat was recaptured by Jean-Jacques Gaultier in 2017.

In 2024, after the dissolution of the National Assembly proclaimed by Emmanuel Macron, the National Rally becomes the first far-right party to win the seat in that constituency, after falling less than 2 points short in 2022.

== Historic Representation ==
Election	Member	Party
1958	Albert Voilquin	DVG
1962	Albert Voilquin	RI
1967	Albert Voilquin	RI
1968	Albert Voilquin	RI
1973	Albert Voilquin	RI
1978	Hubert Voilquin	UDF
1981	Serge Beltrame	PS
1986	Proportional representation - no election by constituency	
1988	Serge Beltrame	PS
1993	Jean-Pierre Thomas	UDF
1997	Christian Franqueville	DVG
2002	Jean-Jacques Gaultier	UMP
2007	Jean-Jacques Gaultier	UMP
2012	Christian Franqueville	PS
2017	Jean-Jacques Gaultier	LR
2022	Jean-Jacques Gaultier	LR
2024	Sébastien Humbert	RN

== Election results ==
=== 2024 ===
Legislative Election 2024: Vosges's 4th constituency
Party	Candidate	Votes	%	±%
RN	Sébastien Humbert	20,529	48.02	+21.92
LR	Jean-Jacques Gaultier	13,644	31.91	+10.41
LFI (NFP)	François-Xavier Wein	6,851	16.02	+0.05
LO	Camille Bailly	674	1.58	+0.65
REC	Caroline Hubert	538	1.26	−1.09
Turnout		44,247	69.01	+17.73
2nd round result
RN	Sébastien Humbert	22,797	53.18	+5.09
LR	Jean-Jacques Gaultier	20,073	46.82	−5.09
Turnout		45,032	70.23	+20.53
RN gain from LR				

=== 2022 ===
Legislative Election 2022: Vosges's 4th constituency
Party	Candidate	Votes	%	±%
RN	Sébastien Humbert	8,530	26.10	+8.87
LR (UDC)	Jean-Jacques Gaultier	7,028	21.50	-0.59
LFI (NUPÉS)	François-Xavier Wein	5,220	15.97	−17.53
LREM (Ensemble)	Christophe Laurent	4,490	13.74	−3.60
PS	Christian Franqueville*	4,049	12.39	N/A
DVG	Joris Huriot	1,905	5.83	N/A
REC	Jocelyne Jabrin	769	2.35	N/A
PA	Thierry Morales	389	1.19	N/A
LO	Camille Bailly	305	0.93	+0.31
Turnout		32,685	51.28	−0.38
2nd round result
LR (UDC)	Jean-Jacques Gaultier	15,441	51.91	-1.56
RN	Sébastien Humbert	14,302	48.09	N/A
Turnout		29,743	49.70	+8.01
LR hold				

* Dissident PS member, not supported by the party or NUPES alliance.

=== 2017 ===
Legislative Election 2017: Vosges's 4th constituency
Party	Candidate	Votes	%	±%
LR	Jean-Jacques Gaultier	7,601	22.09	
PS	Christian Franqueville	6,366	18.50	
MoDem	Raynald Magnien-Coeurdacier	5,964	17.34	
FN	Jordan Grosse-Cruciani	5,926	17.23	
LFI	Renée-Lise Rothiot	3,387	9.85	
DVD	Jocelyne Allane-Voilquin	1,837	5.34	
EELV	Florence Lamaze	1,365	3.97	
Others	N/A	1,956		
Turnout		34,402	51.66	
2nd round result
LR	Jean-Jacques Gaultier	14,836	53.47	
PS	Christian Franqueville	12,909	46.53	
Turnout		27,745	41.69	
LR gain from PS				

=== 2012 ===
Legislative Election 2012: Vosges's 4th constituency
Party	Candidate	Votes	%	±%
PS	Christian Franqueville	15,311	36.99	
UMP	Jean-Jacques Gaultier	14,787	35.72	
FN	Louise Buchmann	6,260	15.12	
FG	Audrey Voyen	1,545	3.73	
EELV	Florence Lamaze	1,279	3.09	
NM	Jocelyne Allane	931	2.25	
Others	N/A	1,280		
Turnout		41,393	60.96	
2nd round result
PS	Christian Franqueville	20,699	50.37	
UMP	Jean-Jacques Gaultier	20,393	49.63	
Turnout		41,092	60.52	
PS gain from UMP				

=== 2007 ===
Legislative Election 2007: Vosges's 4th constituency
Party	Candidate	Votes	%	±%
UMP	Jean-Jacques Gaultier	20,710	49.13	
PS	Christian Franqueville	13,219	31.36	
MoDem	Maryse Ohnenstetter	2,174	5.16	
FN	Bernard Bazin	2,075	4.92	
Far left	Gery Barbot	1,493	3.54	
Others	N/A	2,482		
Turnout		43,119	62.11	
2nd round result
UMP	Jean-Jacques Gaultier	23,347	55.72	
PS	Christian Franqueville	18,555	44.28	
Turnout		43,336	62.44	
UMP hold				

=== 2002 ===
Legislative Election 2002: Vosges's 4th constituency
Party	Candidate	Votes	%	±%
DVG	Christian Franqueville	15,041	34.25	
UMP	Jean-Jacques Gaultier	12,157	27.68	
DVD	Serge Essermeant	6,739	15.35	
FN	Georges Faivre	4,624	10.53	
DIV	François Grossi	907	2.07	
Others	N/A	4,444		
Turnout		45,277	65.86	
2nd round result
UMP	Jean-Jacques Gaultier	21,590	50.77	
DVG	Christian Franqueville	20,939	49.23	
Turnout		44,389	64.48	
UMP gain from DVG				

=== 1997 ===
Legislative Election 1997: Vosges's 4th constituency
Party	Candidate	Votes	%	±%
UDF	Jean-Pierre Thomas	16,409	36.09	
DVG	Christian Franqueville	11,973	26.33	
FN	François Flamerion	7,657	16.84	
LV	Marie-Paule Boyer	4,091	9.00	
DIV	Marcel Bernard	2,920	6.42	
PCF	Michel Gerard	2,418	5.32	
Turnout		48,672	71.79	
2nd round result
DVG	Christian Franqueville	23,983	50.55	
UDF	Jean-Pierre Thomas	23,458	49.45	
Turnout		50,826	74.98	
DVG gain from UDF				

== Sources ==
Official results of French elections from 2002: "Résultats électoraux officiels en France" (in French).
