= Vosges's 2nd constituency =

Constituency of the National Assembly of France

2nd constituency of the Vosges
- inline Constituency of the National Assembly of France

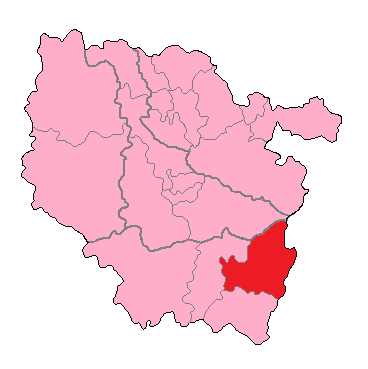
- Vosges' 2nd Constituency shown within Lorraine
- Deputy: David Valence; PRV
- Department: Vosges
- Cantons: Brouvelieures, Bruyères, Corcieux, Fraize, Provenchères-sur-Fave, Raon-l'Étape, Saint-Dié-des-Vosges-Est, Saint-Dié-des-Vosges-Ouest, Senones
- Registered voters: 74,263

The 2nd constituency of the Vosges is a French legislative constituency in the Vosges département.

== Description ==
Vosges' 2nd Constituency consists of the north-eastern corner of Vosges and includes the town of Saint-Dié-des-Vosges as well the surrounding countryside and small villages.

The constituency has historically been a marginal one with the Socialist Party winning in 1978, 1981 and 1997. The constituency, has however, now been represented by the conservative UMP party since 2002.

Notably the defeated PS candidate at the 2012 election was the former Education and Culture minister Jack Lang.

== Historic Representation ==
Election	Member	Party
1958	Maurice Lemaire	UNR
1962	Maurice Lemaire	UNR
1967	Maurice Lemaire	UDR
1968	Maurice Lemaire	UDR
1973	Maurice Lemaire	UDR
1978	Christian Pierret	PS
1981	Christian Pierret	PS
1986	Proportional representation - no election by constituency	
1988	Christian Pierret	PS
1993	Gérard Cherpion	RPR
1997	Claude Jacquot	PS
2002	Gérard Cherpion	UMP
2007	Gérard Cherpion	UMP
2012	Gérard Cherpion	UMP
2017	Gérard Cherpion	LR
2022	David Valence	PRV

== Election results ==
=== 2024 ===
Legislative Election 2024: Vosges's 2nd constituency
Party	Candidate	Votes	%	±%
RN	Gaëtan Dussausaye	22,788	48.16	+19.43
LR	Emma Gateau	1,202	2.54	−9.30
DVE	Lionel Chambrot	10	0.02	n/a
LFI (NFP)	Julie Xicola	7,312	15.45	−2.39
LO	Jeanne-Françoise Langlade	486	1.03	n/a
PRV (Ensemble)	David Valence	14,592	30.84	+0.72
DVC	Emmanuel Thiébaut	925	1.95	−0.24
Turnout		47,315	97.31	+49.25
Registered electors		71,896		
2nd round result
RN	Gaëtan Dussausaye	25,048	52.77	+2.22
PRV	David Valence	22,422	47.23	−2.22
Turnout		47,470	95.65	+48.84
Registered electors		71,910		
RN gain from PRV				

=== 2022 ===
Legislative Election 2022: Vosges's 2nd constituency
Party	Candidate	Votes	%	±%
PRV (Ensemble)	David Valence	10,233	30.12	+1.90
RN	Gaëtan Dussausaye	9,762	28.73	+9.32
LFI (NUPÉS)	Charlotte Moreau	6,061	17.84	+0.07
LR (UDC)	Caroline Privat Mattioni	4,024	11.84	−17.33
DLF (UPF)	Pierre-Jean Robinot	1,573	4.63	+3.32
DVE	Emmanuel Thiebaut	745	2.19	+1.85
Others	N/A	1,580	-	−
Turnout		33,978	48.06	+1.06
2nd round result
PRV (Ensemble)	David Valence	15,823	50.55	+5.96
RN	Gaëtan Dussausaye	15,481	49.45	N/A
Turnout		31,304	46.81	+6.62
PRV gain from LR				

=== 2017 ===
Legislative Election 2017: Vosges's 2nd constituency
Party	Candidate	Votes	%	±%
LR	Gérard Cherpion	10,044	29.17	
LREM	Christine Urbes	9,716	28.22	
FN	Isabelle Gerard	6,683	19.41	
LFI	Sylvain Calbrix	3,704	10.76	
EELV	Christine L'Heureux	1,606	4.66	
PCF	Sandra Blaise	808	2.35	
Others	N/A	1,873		
Turnout		34,434	47.00	
2nd round result
LR	Gérard Cherpion	15,501	55.41	
LREM	Christine Urbes	12,474	44.59	
Turnout		27,975	38.19	
LR hold				

=== 2012 ===
Legislative Election 2012: Vosges's 2nd constituency
Party	Candidate	Votes	%	±%
PS	Jack Lang	16,515	37.50	
UMP	Gérard Cherpion	15,567	35.35	
FN	Jean-François Jalkh	7,679	17.44	
FG	Sandra Blaise	1,780	4.04	
Others	N/A	2,497		
Turnout		44,038	59.30	
2nd round result
UMP	Gérard Cherpion	22,257	50.89	
PS	Jack Lang	21,480	49.11	
Turnout		43,737	58.89	
UMP hold				

=== 2007 ===
Legislative Election 2007: Vosges's 2nd constituency
Party	Candidate	Votes	%	±%
UMP	Gérard Cherpion	18,469	43.92	
PS	Christian Pierret	12,090	28.75	
FN	Chantal Odile	3,221	7.66	
MoDem	Pascal Thomas	3,187	7.58	
PCF	Sandra Blaise	1,403	3.34	
Far left	Catherine Calais	1,241	2.95	
DVE	Catherine Bitterlin	1,110	2.64	
Others	N/A	1,327		
Turnout		43,279	57.19	
2nd round result
UMP	Gérard Cherpion	22,685	54.99	
PS	Christian Pierret	18,566	45.01	
Turnout		43,588	57.60	
UMP hold				

=== 2002 ===
Legislative Election 2002: Vosges's 2nd constituency
Party	Candidate	Votes	%	±%
UMP	Gérard Cherpion	16,700	38.64	
PS	Claude Jacquot	13,390	30.98	
FN	Georg Kuhn	6,221	14.39	
UDF	Marc Parmentelot	1,777	4.11	
PCF	Françoise George	1,160	2.68	
Others	N/A	3,971		
Turnout		44,760	61.01	
2nd round result
UMP	Gérard Cherpion	21,538	52.53	
PS	Claude Jacquot	19,460	47.47	
Turnout		43,286	59.00	
UMP gain from PS				

=== 1997 ===
Legislative Election 1997: Vosges's 2nd constituency
Party	Candidate	Votes	%	±%
PS	Christian Pierret	19,146	40.91	
RPR	Gérard Cherpion	13,606	29.07	
FN	Suzette Cassin	6,998	14.95	
PCF	Christian Staphe	2,709	5.79	
DIV	Dominique Marin	1,792	3.83	
Others	N/A	2,549		
Turnout		49,698	69.95	
2nd round result
PS	Christian Pierret	28,574	58.38	
RPR	Gérard Cherpion	20,374	41.62	
Turnout		52,538	73.96	
PS gain from RPR				

== Sources ==
Official results of French elections from 2002: "Résultats électoraux officiels en France" (in French).
