= Arrondissements of the Vosges department =

Administrative divisions of Vosges, France

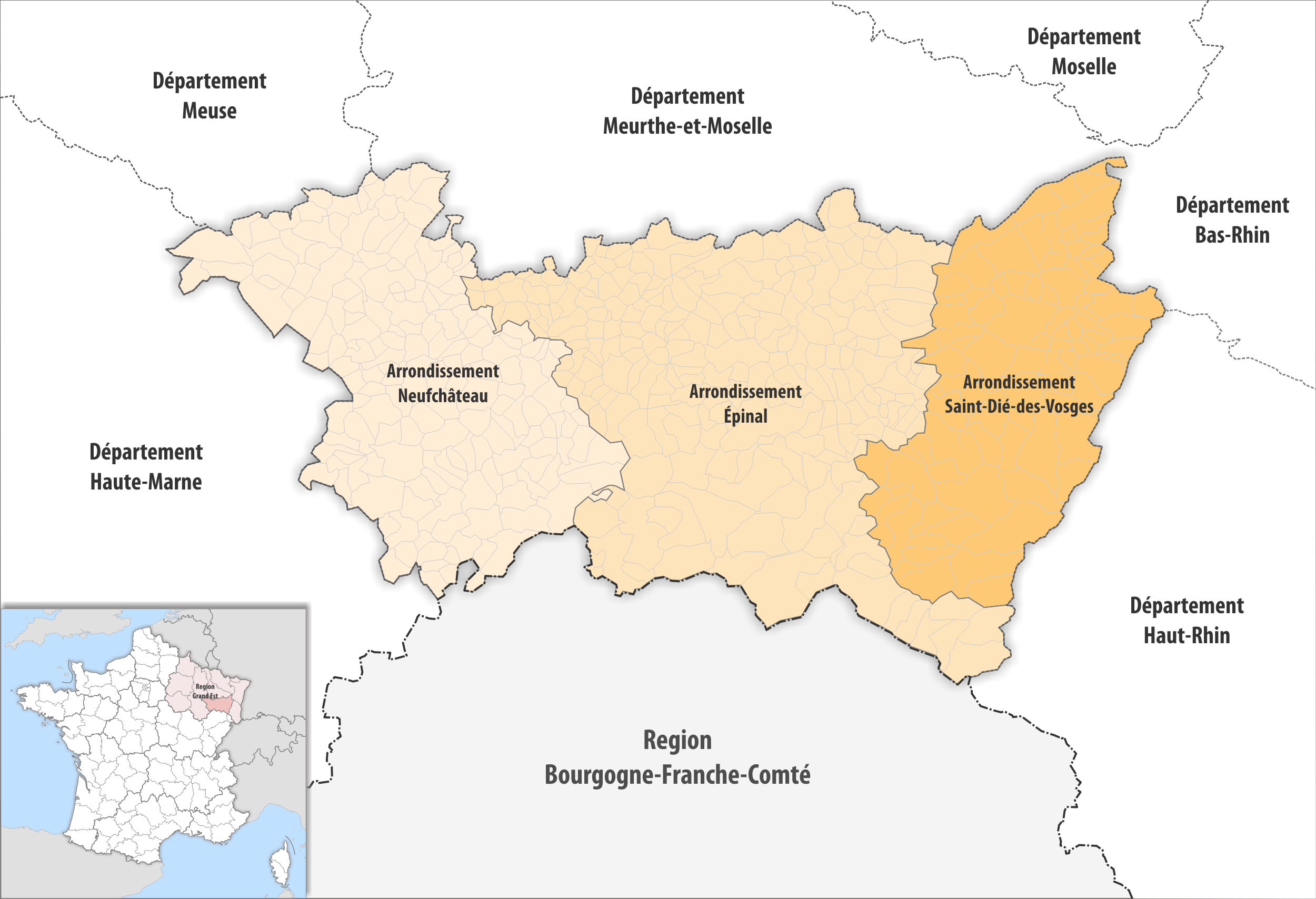
Map of arrondissements of the Vosges department between 2017 and 2024.

The 3 arrondissements of the Vosges department are:

1. Arrondissement of Épinal, (prefecture of the Vosges department: Épinal) with 140 communes. The population of the arrondissement was 187,993 in 2021.
2. Arrondissement of Neufchâteau, (subprefecture: Neufchâteau) with 251 communes. The population of the arrondissement was 70,442 in 2021.
3. Arrondissement of Saint-Dié-des-Vosges, (subprefecture: Saint-Dié-des-Vosges) with 116 communes. The population of the arrondissement was 102,238 in 2021.

== History ==
In 1800 the arrondissements of Épinal, Mirecourt, Neufchâteau, Remiremont and Saint-Dié were established. The arrondissements of Mirecourt and Remiremont were disbanded in 1926. In January 2013 the two cantons of Darney and Monthureux-sur-Saône passed from the arrondissement of Épinal to the arrondissement of Neufchâteau.

The borders of the arrondissements of Vosges were modified in January 2019:

- two communes from the arrondissement of Épinal to the arrondissement of Neufchâteau
- 15 communes from the arrondissement of Épinal to the arrondissement of Saint-Dié-des-Vosges
- 32 communes from the arrondissement of Neufchâteau to the arrondissement of Épinal
- seven communes from the arrondissement of Saint-Dié-des-Vosges to the arrondissement of Épinal

The borders of the arrondissements of Vosges were again modified in January 2024:

- 14 communes from the arrondissement of Saint-Dié-des-Vosges to the arrondissement of Épinal
- 76 communes from the arrondissement of Épinal to the arrondissement of Neufchâteau
- 34 communes from the arrondissement of Épinal to the arrondissement of Saint-Dié-des-Vosges
