= Gaëtan Dussausaye =

French politician (born 1994)

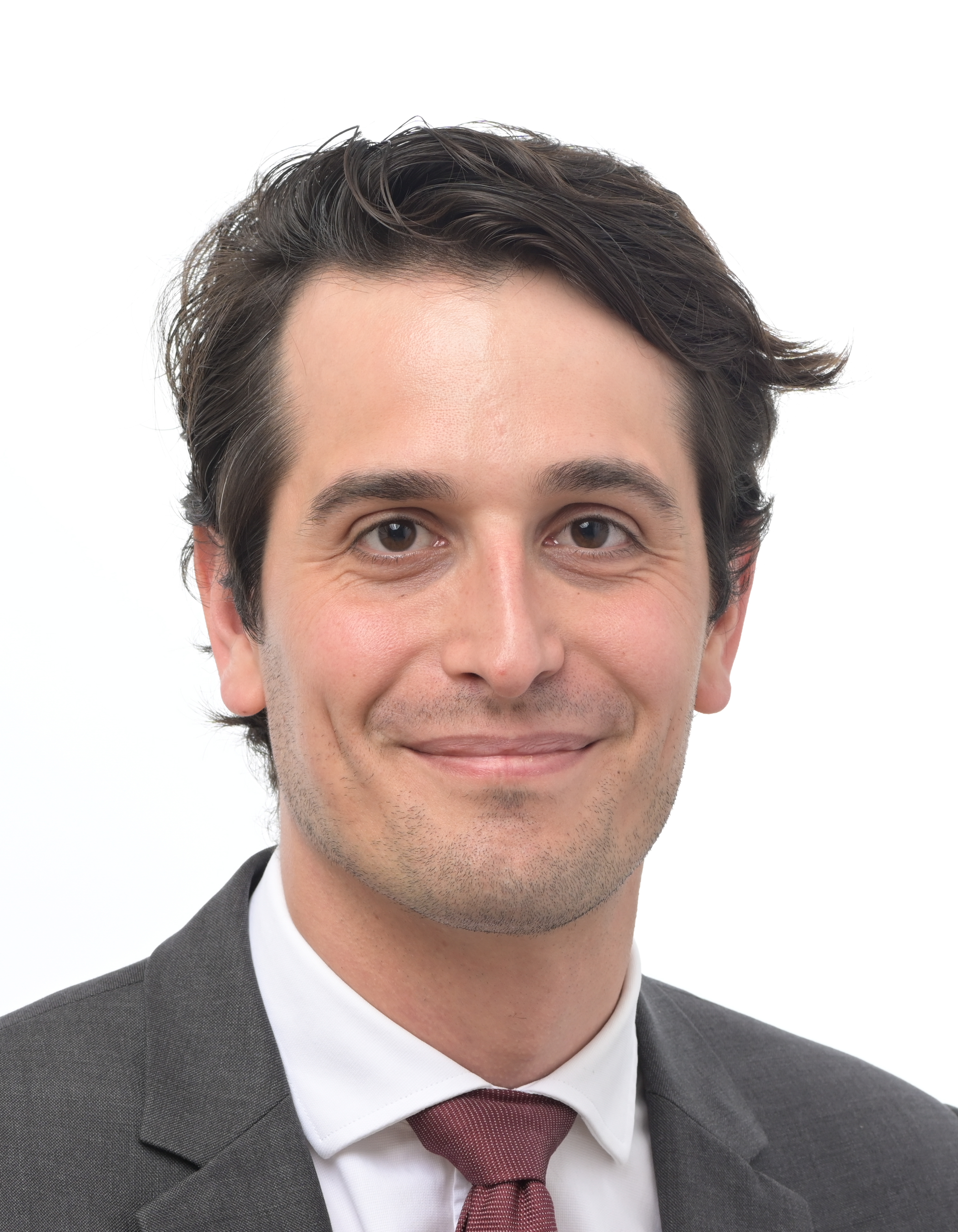

Member of the National Assembly for Vosges's 2nd constituency
- Incumbent
- Assumed office 8 July 2024
- Preceded by: David Valence

Member of the European Parliament
- In office 16 July 2024 – 26 September 2024
- Constituency: France

Member of the Regional Council of Île-de-France
- In office 27 June 2021 – 8 July 2024

President of the National Youth Front
- In office 8 October 2014 – 12 March 2018
- President: Marine Le Pen
- Preceded by: Julien Rochedy
- Succeeded by: Jordan Bardella

Personal details
- Born: 5 April 1994 (age 32) Brétigny-sur-Orge, France
- Party: National Rally
- Education: University of Paris 1 Panthéon-Sorbonne

Gaëtan Dussausaye (French pronunciation: [ɡaɛtɑ̃ dysozɛ]; born 5 April 1994) is a French politician who has represented the 2nd constituency of Vosges in the National Assembly since 2024. He is a member of the National Rally (RN, formerly National Front).

From 2014 to 2018, he presided over the National Front's youth wing, the National Youth Front (FNJ). In 2021 he was elected to the Regional Council of Île-de-France.

In the 2024 European Parliament election in France, he was elected a Member of the European Parliament (MEP), but quickly resigned his seat following his election to the National Assembly.

== Biography ==
Dussausaye was born in the Parisian suburb of Brétigny-sur-Orge. He grew up in neighbouring Le Plessis-Pâté, with a mother who worked as a nurse, a father who was marketing director for a large French company, two brothers and one sister. His parents were not political and had never voted for the National Front.

He obtained a baccalauréat littéraire, graded 'Bien', in 2011. During his years at school, he ran a metal band, the Bursting Creepy. He started to become interested in politics after observing discrimination between the students at school.

He studied at the University of Paris 1 Panthéon-Sorbonne, where he obtained a bachelor's degree in philosophy and modern literature. After starting a master's degree in philosophy, he abandoned his studies following his accession to the presidency of the FNJ.

=== In the National Front ===
After a brief involvement with a group dedicated to the memory of Charles de Gaulle, Dussausaye joined the National Front in 2011. His mother encouraged him to campaign in Paris, which was far away from his family's hometown. He began his political career as an activist during the 2012 presidential campaign of Marine Le Pen. He was successively deputy Head of the FNJ in Paris and departmental secretary for Youth in Paris.

On 8 October 2014, Le Pen named him FNJ President. He benefited from the support of local figure Wallerand de Saint-Just, and succeeded Julien Rochedy, who "struggled to come to a consensus." At the FN conference in November 2014, he joined the central committee (nominated by Le Pen) and the political office. He was a permanent employee of the National Front's Nanterre branch, where the headquarters were located.

In 2018, he was appointed the National Rally's co-representative for research and communications.

=== Early electoral campaigns ===
In 2014, Dussausaye was a candidate in the municipal election in the 11th arrondissement of Paris, where he earned 5.5% of the vote. In 2015, he was a candidate in the Essonne departmental election in the canton of Brétigny-sur-Orge, earning 25.3% of the first-round vote.

In 2017, Dussausaye was a candidate in the legislative election in Oise's 2nd constituency, advancing to the second round, where he was defeated with 45.3% of the vote by Agnès Thill of La République En Marche! (LREM). In a 2020 by-election he contested Val-de-Marne's 9th constituency, earning 9% of the first-round vote.

In 2021 he was elected to the Regional Council of Île-de-France.

=== In the National Assembly ===
In the 2022 legislative election, Dussausaye was narrowly defeated in Vosges's 2nd constituency by David Valence of the Radical Party with 49.5% of the second-round vote.

In the 2024 European Parliament election, he was 29th on the National Rally list led by Jordan Bardella and thus elected a Member of the European Parliament. After President Emmanuel Macron called a snap legislative election, Dussausaye contested Vosges's 2nd constituency again; and this time won with 52.7% of the second-round vote against Valence. He quickly resigned his seat in the European Parliament following his election to the National Assembly.

== Political beliefs ==
Dussausaye is seen as an important figure in the de-demonisation of the National Rally. While he does not label himself a Gaullist, he is an admirer of Charles de Gaulle. He describes himself as a "patriot and sovereignist". Although he is sometimes presented as being politically close with Florian Philippot, Le Figaro places him within the party alongside "the non-aligned, because of their long-term commitment to the Front, their personal closeness with [Le Pen], and the cautious neutrality they have observed in the recent conflicts."

In an interview soon after he became FNJ President, he was asked about the Great Replacement theory. In response he stated that he "does not see a replacement of people", but "above all a replacement of culture, at the base of Renaud Camus's theory there is a racialist foundation that we do not consider." This statement attracted many hostile responses from within the party.

Between 2014 and 2015, Dussausaye said that he was inspired by Aristotle, Rousseau, Spinoza, Vian, Orwell and Marx – in regards to the latter he said: "not out of adhesion, but to have an argument against the left."

After the 2017 presidential election, he denied "without question" that the FN was in favour of leaving the eurozone.
