= Sébastien Humbert =

French politician (born 1990)

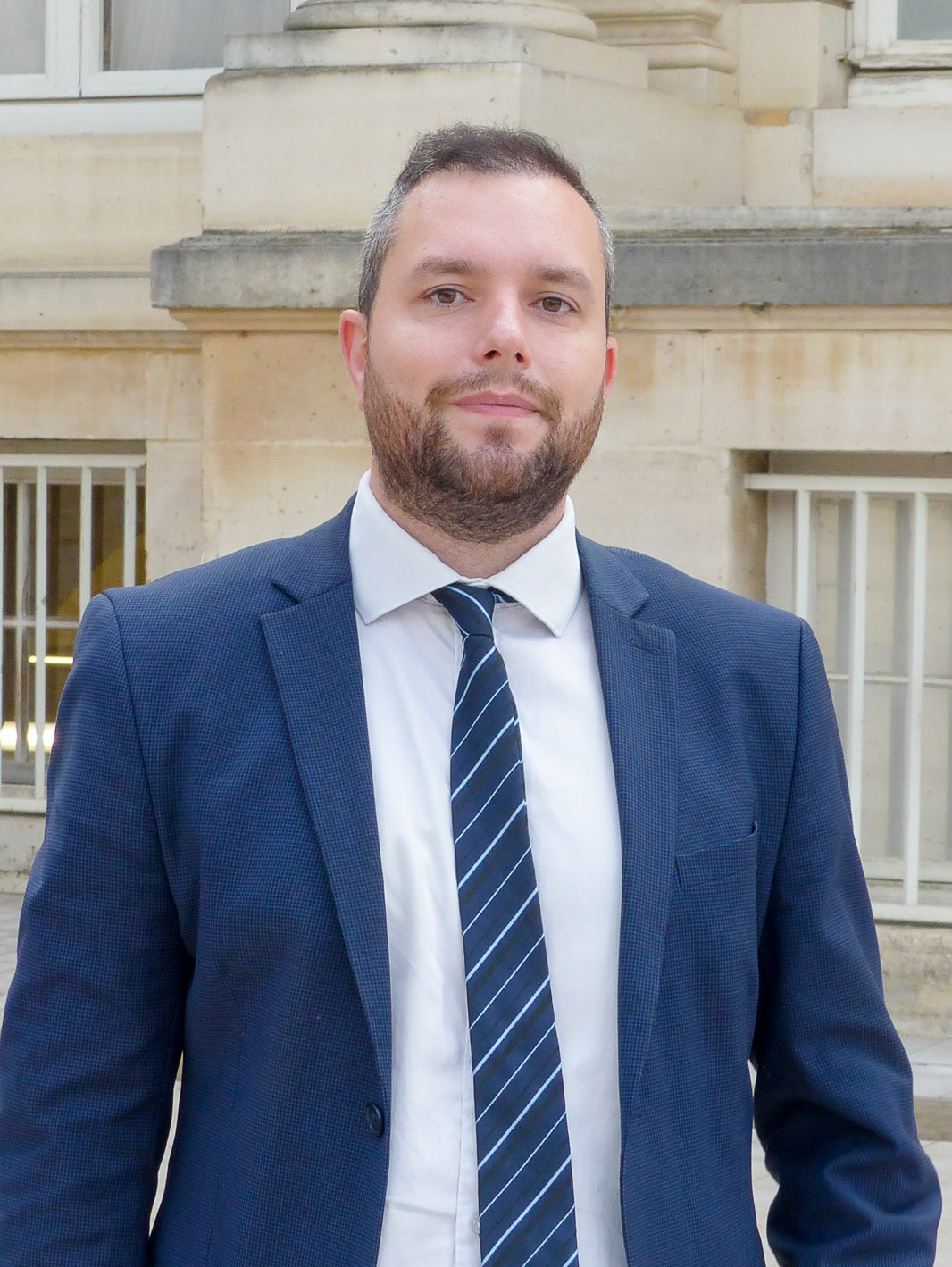
- Humbert in 2024

Member of the National Assembly for Vosges's 4th constituency
- Incumbent
- Assumed office 8 July 2024
- Preceded by: Jean-Jacques Gaultier

Personal details
- Born: 10 July 1990 (age 35) Épinal, France
- Party: National Rally

Sébastien Humbert (French pronunciation: [sebastjɛ̃ ɛ̃bɛʁ]; born 10 July 1990) is a French politician who has represented the 4th constituency of the Vosges department in the National Assembly since 2024. He is a member of the National Rally (RN).

== Early life and career ==
Humbert was born in Épinal in 1990, to a father who worked in silviculture and a mother who worked as caregiver in residential care. His grandparents were farmers in La Chapelle-aux-Bois, leading him to join the National Rally at the age of 21 over rurality concerns. He studied electronics in Mirecourt and IT in Nancy, and worked at the Chamber of Agriculture in Nancy from 2011 to 2012 and the Ministry of Justice from 2012 to 2015.

In the 2015 departmental elections he was a candidate in the canton of Le Val-d'Ajol, and in the 2017 legislative election he was a candidate for Vosges's 1st constituency. He served as departmental secretary of the Rassemblement national de la jeunesse and as leader of the National Rally in the canton of Le Val-d'Ajol, and in 2018 was named departmental delegate of the party. He was also a candidate for the 2020 municipal elections, the 2020 senate election, and the 2021 departmental elections. In the 2022 legislative election, he was a candidate for Vosges's 4th constituency.
