= Cantons of the Vosges department =

The following is a list of the 17 cantons of the Vosges department, in France, following the French canton reorganisation which came into effect in March 2015:

- La Bresse
- Bruyères
- Charmes
- Darney
- Épinal-1
- Épinal-2
- Gérardmer
- Golbey
- Mirecourt
- Neufchâteau
- Raon-l'Étape
- Remiremont
- Saint-Dié-des-Vosges-1
- Saint-Dié-des-Vosges-2
- Le Thillot
- Le Val-d'Ajol
- Vittel
