= Stéphane Viry =

French politician

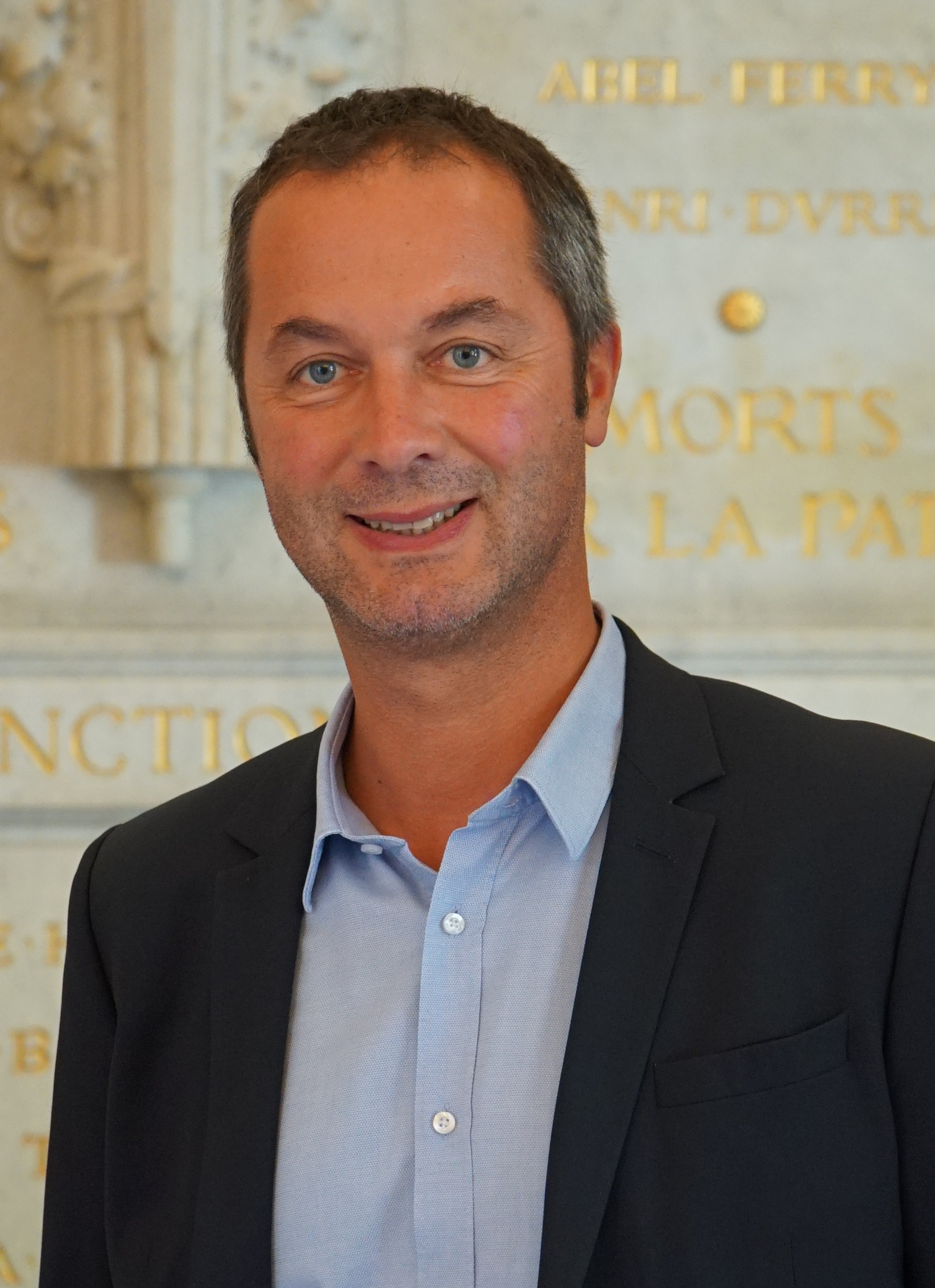

Member of the National Assembly for Vosges's 1st constituency
- Incumbent
- Assumed office 21 June 2017
- Preceded by: Michel Heinrich

Personal details
- Born: 14 October 1969 (age 56) Épinal, Vosges, France
- Party: Republican
- Education: Nancy 2 University

Stéphane Viry (born 14 October 1969) is a French Republican politician who has represented Vosges's 1st constituency in the National Assembly since 2017. Ahead of the Republicans’ 2022 convention, Viry endorsed Aurélien Pradié as the party’s chairman.

== Biography ==
Stéphane Viry was elected to the Épinal town council in 1989, at the age of 19, on Philippe Séguin's list. He became deputy finance minister after the 1995 elections, then first deputy when Michel Heinrich became mayor of the town in 1997. He left politics in 2001 to devote himself to his career as a lawyer. From 2007 to 2013, he was also president of the Stade athlétique spinalien.

He returned to politics for the 2014 municipal elections. He was elected municipal and community councillor on Michel Heinrich's list. On January 1, 2017, he became vice-president of the Épinal agglomeration community.

In the 2017 legislative elections, he was elected deputy in the Vosges' first constituency with 53.12% of the vote against Alisson Hamelin, a La République en marche candidate.

He was the LR group's referent on the pension reform project, and has since worked on employment and social protection issues: in particular, he chairs the joint information mission on the conditionality of public aid.

For the 2022 presidential election, he supports Xavier Bertrand, whom he met through Julien Dive.

In the 2022 legislative elections, he was re-elected deputy with 67.23% of the vote against Emmie Moons, the Rassemblement National candidate.

For the 2022 Republican Congress, he supports Aurélien Pradié.

At the National Assembly, he is in charge of the LR text for the pension reform bill, in tandem with Thibault Bazin.

In 2023, along with other LR MPs, he published an article in Le Figaro calling on LR and the Renaissance presidential party to form a government coalition.
