= Jean-Jacques Gaultier =

French politician

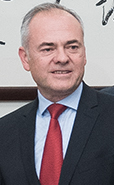
- Jean-Jacques Gaultier in 2017

Member of the National Assembly for Vosges's 4th constituency
- Incumbent
- Assumed office 21 June 2017
- Preceded by: Christian Franqueville

Mayor of Vittel
- In office 4 April 2014 – 17 July 2017
- Preceded by: Jean-Claude Millot
- Succeeded by: Franck Perry

Personal details
- Born: 13 July 1963 (age 62) Épinal, France
- Party: The Republicans
- Profession: Physician

Jean-Jacques Gaultier (born 13 July 1963) is a French politician of the Republicans (LR) who has been serving as a member of the National Assembly of France, representing the Vosges department. He was the deputy for Vosges's 4th constituency from 2002 to 2012 and again from 2017 onwards.

== Political career ==
In parliament, Gaultier has been serving on the Committee on Cultural and Education Affairs (2002–2012, since 2017).

In addition to his committee assignments, Gaultier has been a member of the French delegation to the Franco-German Parliamentary Assembly since 2019.

In the run-up to the Republicans’ 2022 convention, Gaultier endorsed Éric Ciotti as the party's chairman.
