= Vosges (department) =

Department of Grand Est, France

- Department of France
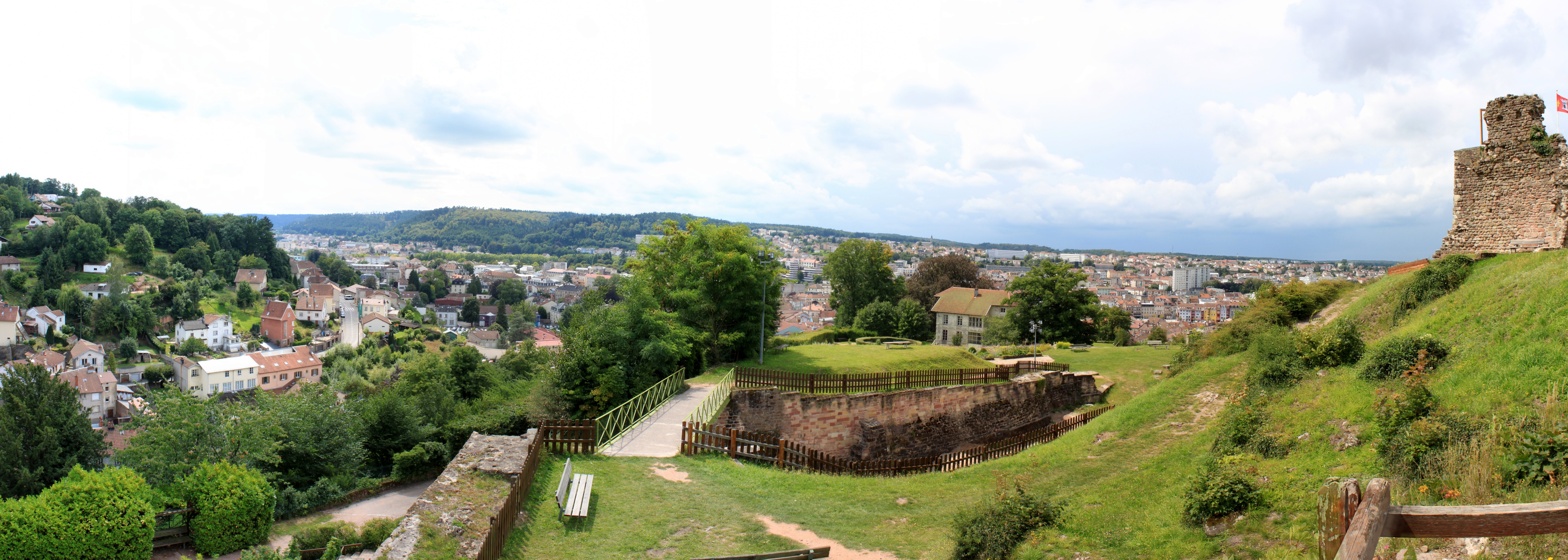
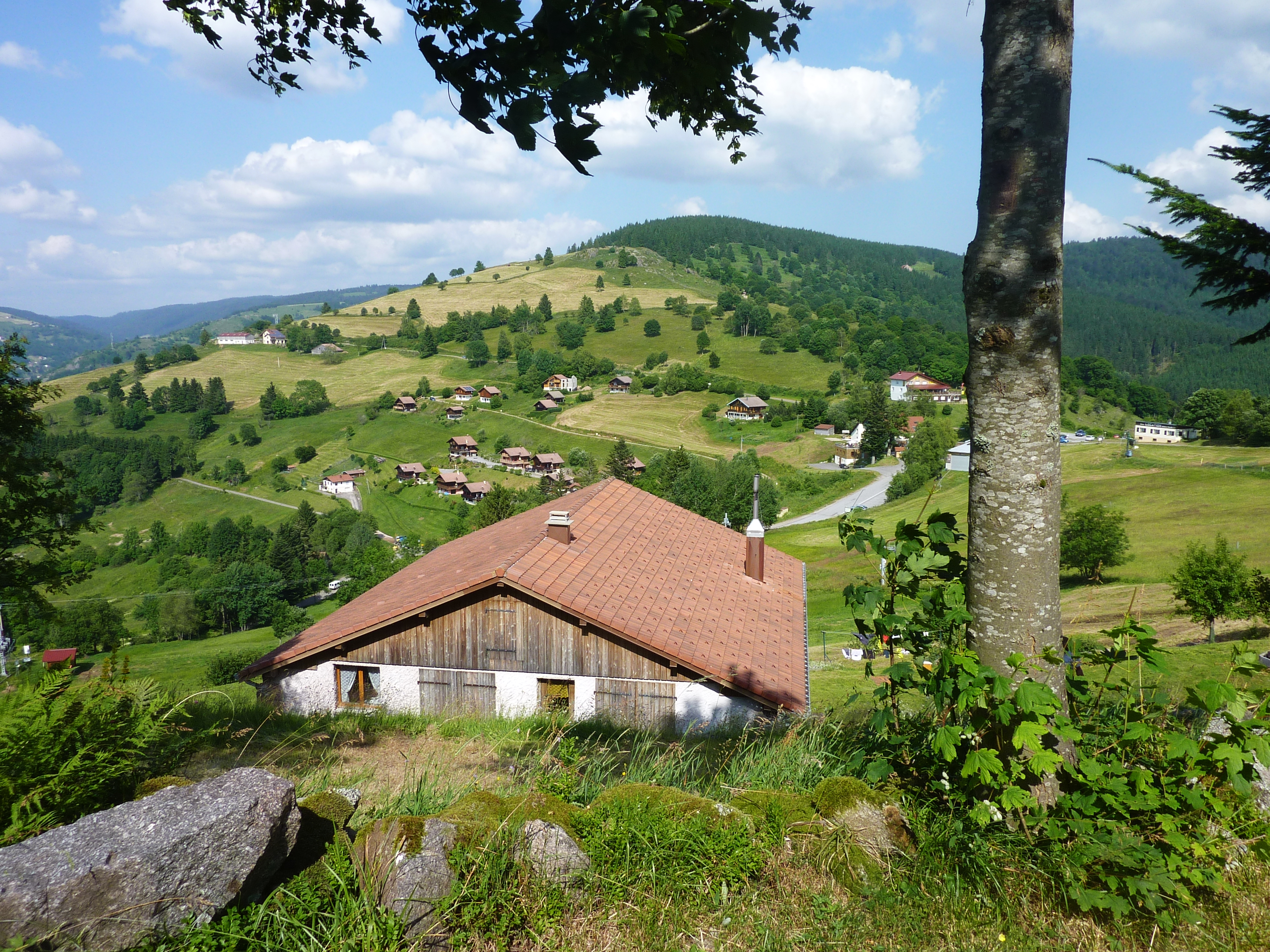
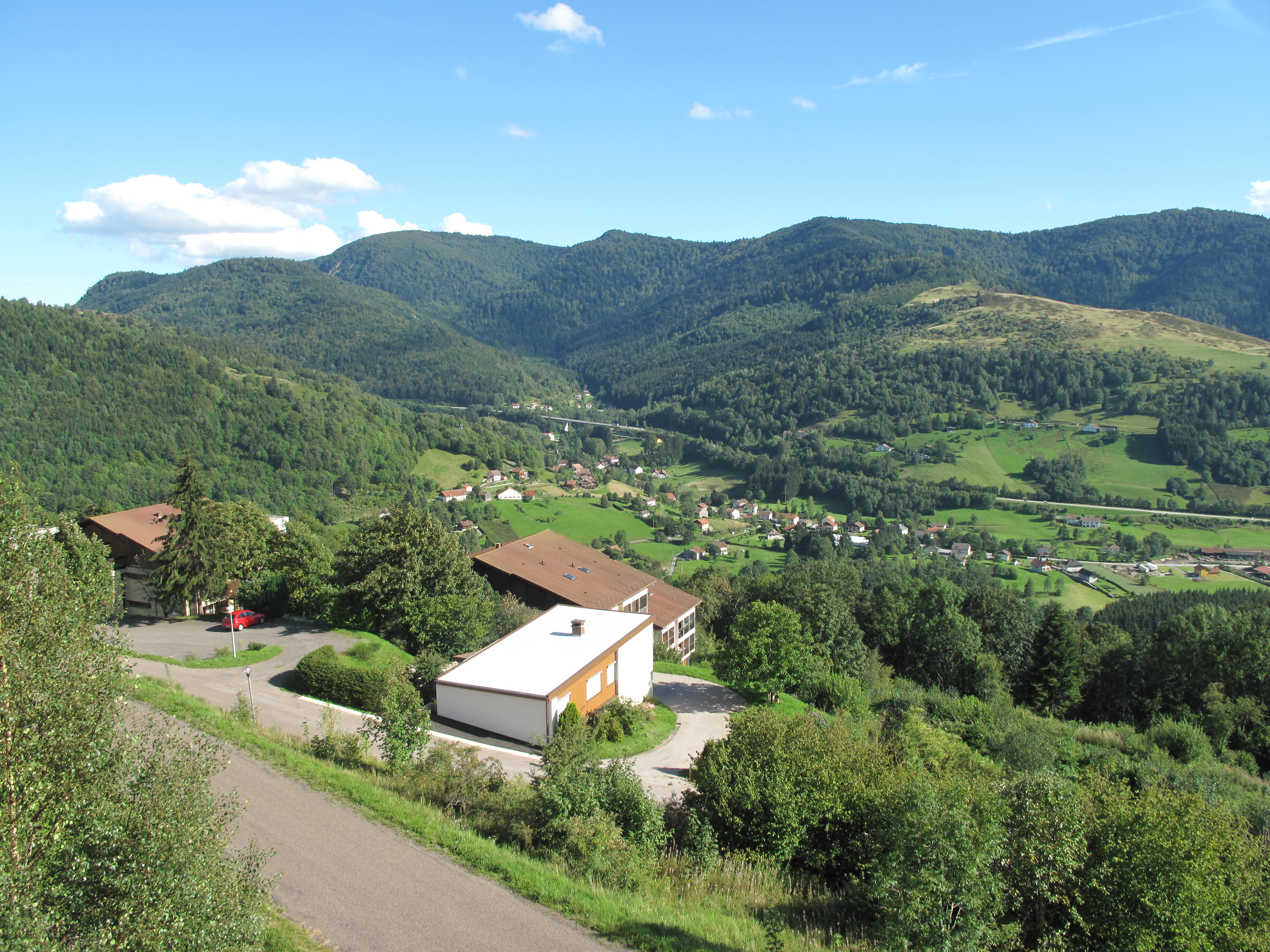
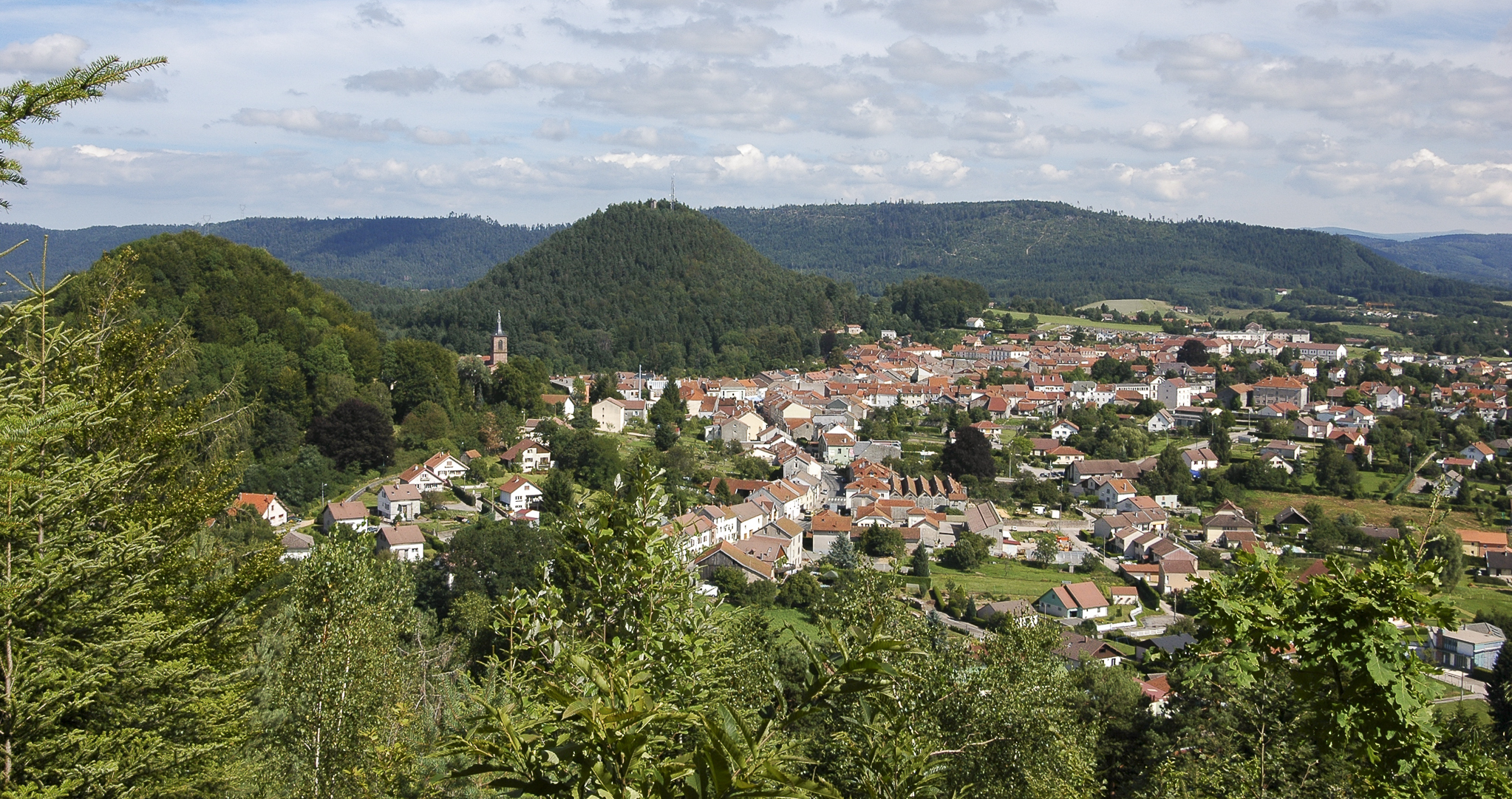
- Clockwise from top: Épinal seen from the castle ruins, Bussang, Bruyères with Mont Avison in the background, La Bresse

- Flag Coat of arms

- Location of Vosges in France
- Coordinates: 48°10′N 06°25′E
- Country: France
- Region: Grand Est
- Prefecture: Épinal
- Subprefectures: Neufchâteau; Saint-Dié-des-Vosges

Government
  - President of the Departmental Council: François Vannson (LR)

Area^{1}
  - Total: 5,874 km^{2} (2,268 sq mi)

Population (2023)
  - Total: 357,248
  - Rank: 67th
  - Density: 60.82/km^{2} (157.5/sq mi)
- Time zone: UTC+1 (CET)
  - Summer (DST): UTC+2 (CEST)
- Department number: 88
- Arrondissements: 3
- Cantons: 17
- Communes: 506
- ^1 French Land Register data, which exclude estuaries and lakes, ponds and glaciers larger than 1 km^{2}

Vosges (French pronunciation: [voʒ]) is a department in the Grand Est region of northeastern France. It covers part of the Vosges mountain range, after which it is named. Vosges consists of three arrondissements, 17 cantons, and 506 communes, including Domrémy-la-Pucelle, where Joan of Arc was born. In 2023, it had a population of 357,248 with an area of 5,874 km^{2} (2,268 sq mi); its prefecture is Épinal.

== History ==
=== Hundred Years' War ===
Joan of Arc was born in the village of Domrémy, then in the French part of the Duchy of Bar, or Barrois mouvant, located west of the Meuse. The part of the duchy lying east of the Meuse was part of the Holy Roman Empire. The Duchy of Bar later became part of the province of Lorraine. The village of Domrémy was renamed Domrémy-la-Pucelle in honour of Joan.

=== French Revolution ===
The Vosges department is one of the original 83 departments of France, created on 4 March 1790 during the French Revolution. It was made of territories that had been part of the government of Lorraine and Barrois. In German it is referred to as Vogesen.

In 1793, the independent Principality of Salm-Salm (town of Senones and its surroundings), enclosed inside the Vosges department, was annexed to France and incorporated into Vosges. In 1795, the area of Schirmeck was detached from the Bas-Rhin department and incorporated into the Vosges department. The Vosges department then had an area of 6,127 km^{2} (2,366 sq mi), which it kept until 1871.

In 1794, Vosges was near the site of the Battle of Trippstadt, a major battle between the forces of Revolutionary France and the Allied Coalition. The oldest square in Paris, Place Royale, was renamed Place des Vosges in 1800 when the department became the first to pay the new revolutionary taxes.

=== Franco-Prussian War ===
After the French defeat in the Franco-Prussian War of 1870–1871, 4% of the Vosges department in the extreme northeast of the department was annexed to the German Empire by the Treaty of Frankfurt on the ground that the people there spoke German dialects. The area annexed on 18 May 1871 corresponded to the canton of Schirmeck and the northern half of the canton of Saales. Schirmeck and Saales had been historically part of Alsace. These territories, along with the rest of Alsace and the annexed territories of Lorraine, became part of the Reichsland of Alsace-Lorraine (Elsaß-Lothringen). The area of the Vosges department was thus reduced to its current 5,874 km^{2} (2,268 sq mi).

=== First and Second World Wars ===
In 1919, with the allied victory in the World War I, Alsace-Lorraine was returned to France by Germany at the Treaty of Versailles. However, Schirmeck and Saales were not returned to the Vosges department, but instead were incorporated into the recreated Bas-Rhin department.

An ill-fated Special Air Service (SAS) mission called Operation Loyton took place in the Vosges forests in 1944.

Various military cemeteries are located in the department, the largest of which is the Epinal American Cemetery and Memorial in Dinozé, near Épinal. It was built by the American 45th Infantry Division in September 1944 and completed in 1959. 5,253 soldiers killed in action during fighting in France, the Vosges, the Rhine valley and Germany are interred there.

== Geography ==
While the west part of the Vosges is flat sedimentary land (well suited for mineral waters), the east is dominated by the Vosges Mountain range and the Ballons des Vosges Nature Park. The Hohneck at 1363m is the highest peak of the Vosges department. The Monts Faucilles traverse the south of the department in a broad curve declining on the north into elevated plateaus, on the south encircling the upper basin of the River Saône. This chain, dividing the basins of the Rhône and the Rhine, forms part of the European watershed between the basins of the Mediterranean and Atlantic. 48% of the department is covered by woodlands and forests (the third highest in France), while 45% of land is in agricultural use.

The Saône (named after the Celtic goddess Sagona) rises at Vioménil, in the Vosges. The Anger river also passes through it.

=== Principal towns ===
The most populated commune is Épinal, the prefecture. As of 2023, there are 9 communes with more than 5,000 inhabitants:

| Commune | Population (2023) |
|---|---|
| Épinal | 32,251 |
| Saint-Dié-des-Vosges | 19,251 |
| Golbey | 8,832 |
| Thaon-les-Vosges | 8,547 |
| Gérardmer | 7,581 |
| Remiremont | 7,388 |
| Neufchâteau | 6,732 |
| Raon-l'Étape | 5,886 |
| Rambervillers | 5,018 |

== Demographics ==
Population development since 1801:

Historical population

| Year | Pop. | ±% p.a. |
|---|---|---|
| 1801 | 308,920 | — |
| 1806 | 334,169 | +1.58% |
| 1831 | 397,987 | +0.70% |
| 1841 | 419,992 | +0.54% |
| 1851 | 427,409 | +0.18% |
| 1861 | 415,485 | −0.28% |
| 1872 | 392,988 | −0.50% |
| 1881 | 406,862 | +0.39% |
| 1891 | 410,196 | +0.08% |
| 1901 | 421,104 | +0.26% |
| 1911 | 433,914 | +0.30% |
| 1921 | 383,684 | −1.22% |
| 1931 | 377,980 | −0.15% |

| Year | Pop. | ±% p.a. |
|---|---|---|
| 1936 | 376,926 | −0.06% |
| 1946 | 342,315 | −0.96% |
| 1954 | 372,523 | +1.06% |
| 1962 | 380,676 | +0.27% |
| 1968 | 388,201 | +0.33% |
| 1975 | 397,957 | +0.36% |
| 1982 | 395,769 | −0.08% |
| 1990 | 386,258 | −0.30% |
| 1999 | 380,952 | −0.15% |
| 2007 | 380,304 | −0.02% |
| 2012 | 377,282 | −0.16% |
| 2017 | 367,673 | −0.51% |
| 2023 | 357,248 | −0.48% |

== Culture ==
The Roman fortified town of Grand, located 30 km from Toul, has an amphitheatre and a temple to the Cult of Apollo. At La Bure, located a few kilometres from Saint-Dié-des-Vosges, archaeologists have found evidence for human habitation going back to around 2000 BC.

=== Séré de Rivières forts ===
As a border area, the Vosges region was a route for possible invasion. As such four important forts were constructed in the department: Bourlémont Fort in Mont-les-Neufchâteau (built between 1878 and 1881); Uxegney Fort (built between 1882 and 1884); Bois l'Abbé Fort (built in 1884 and 1885); and the Le Parmont Fort in Remiremont (built between 1874 and 1876).

== Politics ==
The president of the Departmental Council is François Vannson, first elected in 2015.

=== Presidential elections 2nd round ===
| Election | Winning candidate | Party | % | 2nd place candidate | Party | % |
|---|---|---|---|---|---|---|
| 2022 | Emmanuel Macron | LREM | 47.59 | Marine Le Pen | RN | 52.41 |
| 2017 | Emmanuel Macron | LREM | 55.26 | Marine Le Pen | FN | 44.74 |
| 2012 | Nicolas Sarkozy | UMP | 50.94 | François Hollande | PS | 49.06 |
| 2007 | Nicolas Sarkozy | UMP | 54.72 | Ségolène Royal | PS | 45.28 |
| 2002 | Jacques Chirac | RPR | 78.81 | Jean-Marie Le Pen | FN | 21.19 |
| 1995 | Jacques Chirac | RPR | 51.44 | Lionel Jospin | PS | 48.56 |

=== Current National Assembly Representatives ===
| Constituency | Member | Party |
|---|---|---|
| Vosges's 1st constituency | Stéphane Viry | The Republicans |
| Vosges's 2nd constituency | Gaëtan Dussausaye | National Rally |
| Vosges's 3rd constituency | Christophe Naegelen | Union of Democrats and Independents |
| Vosges's 4th constituency | Sébastien Humbert | National Rally |

== Transport ==
For national and international flights, the nearest airports are Strasbourg Airport, EuroAirport Basel Mulhouse Freiburg, and Metz–Nancy–Lorraine Airport are located within a rather short distance.

== Tourism ==
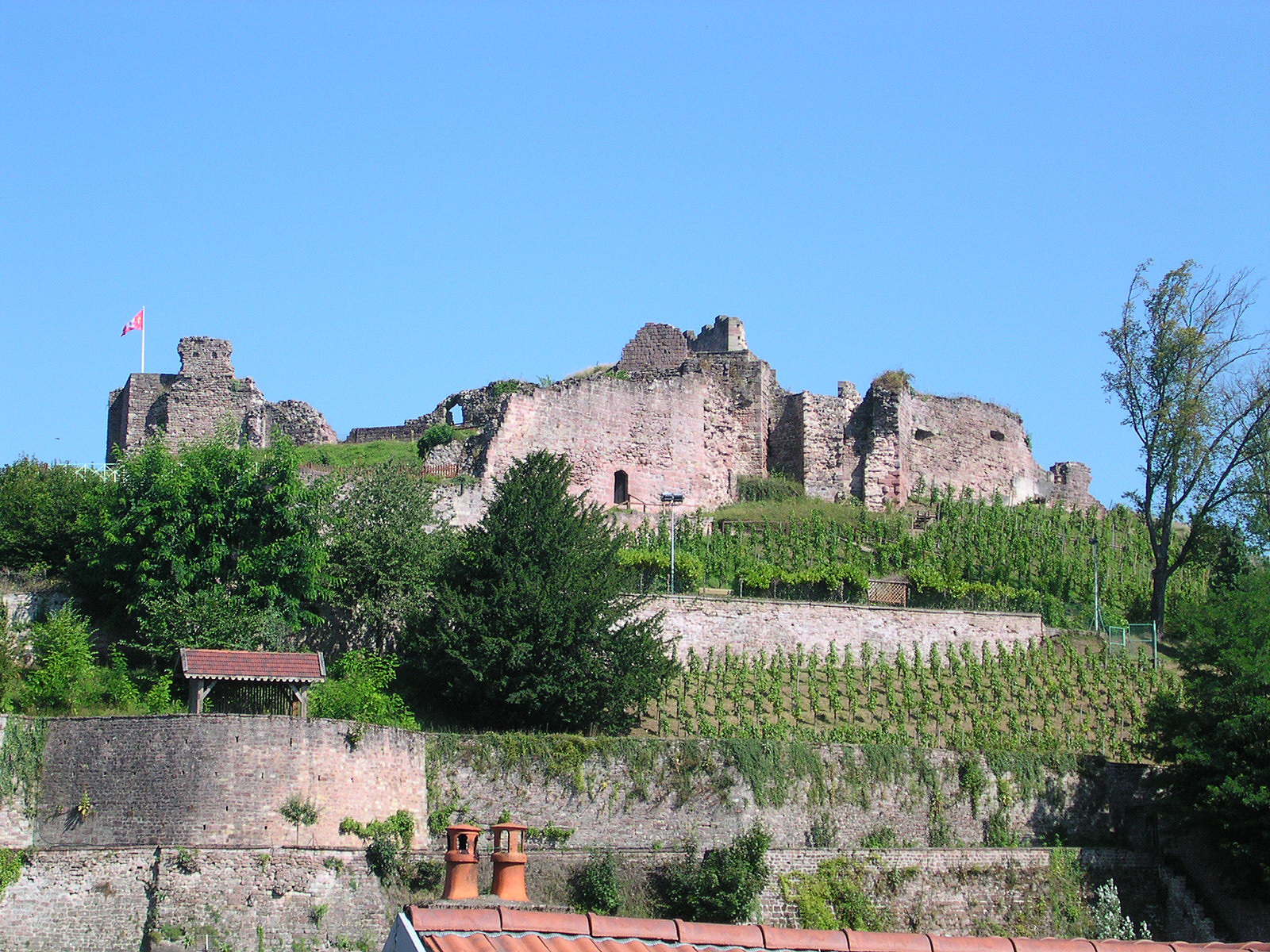
Fort of Épinal

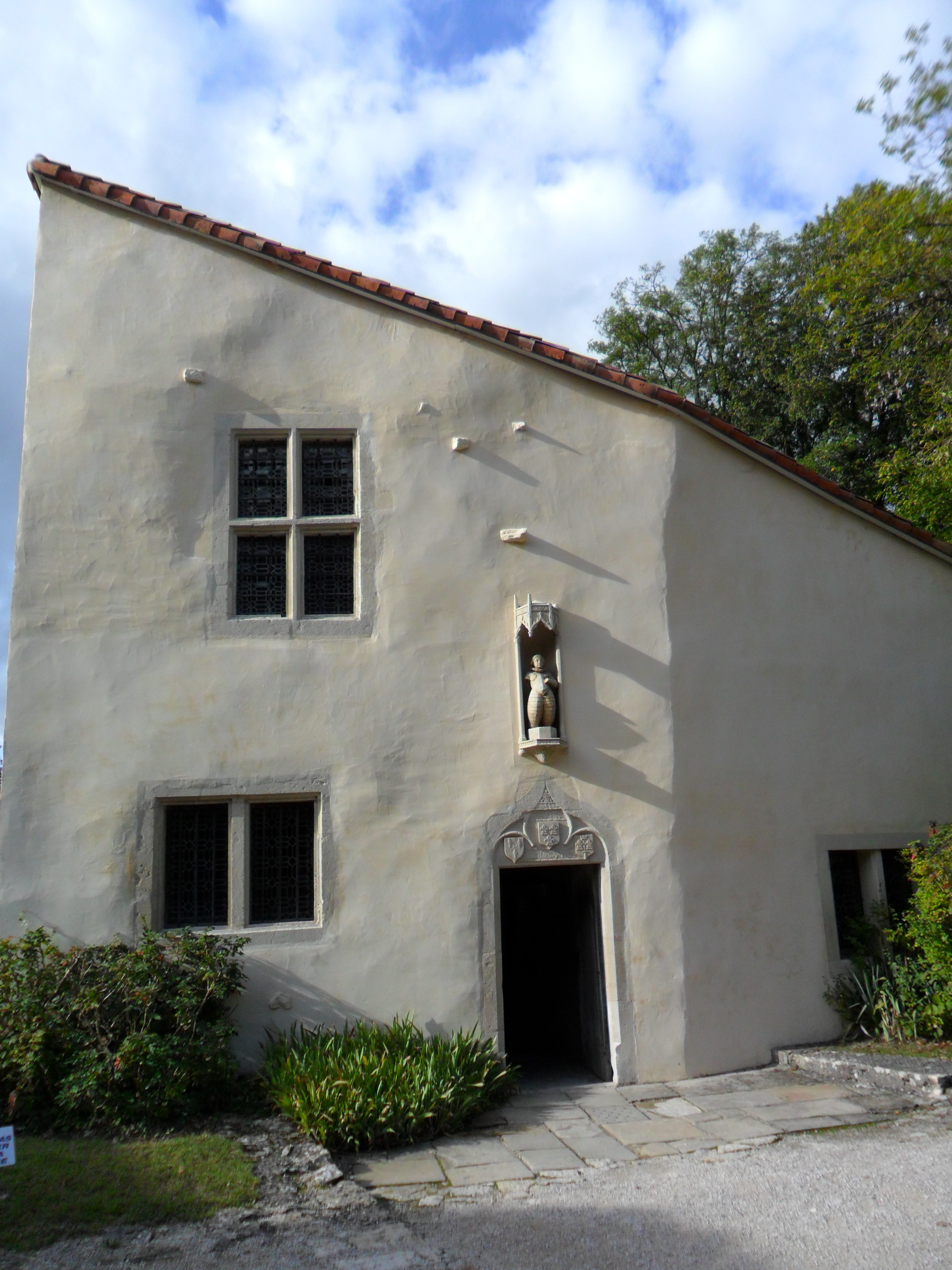
Birth house of Joan of Arc in Domrémy-la-Pucelle

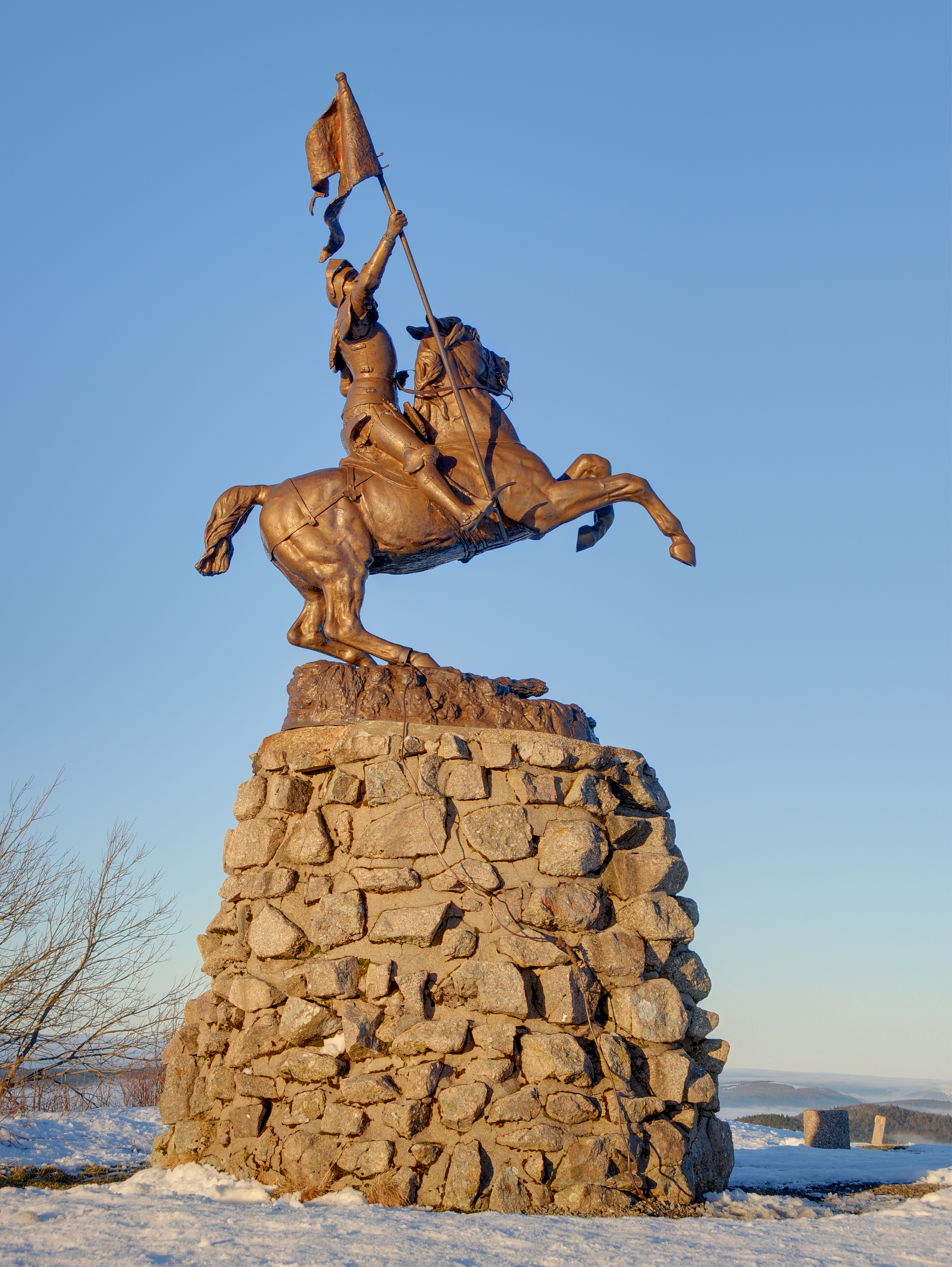
Statue of Joan of Arc erected in 1909 at the former border with Alsace-Lorraine

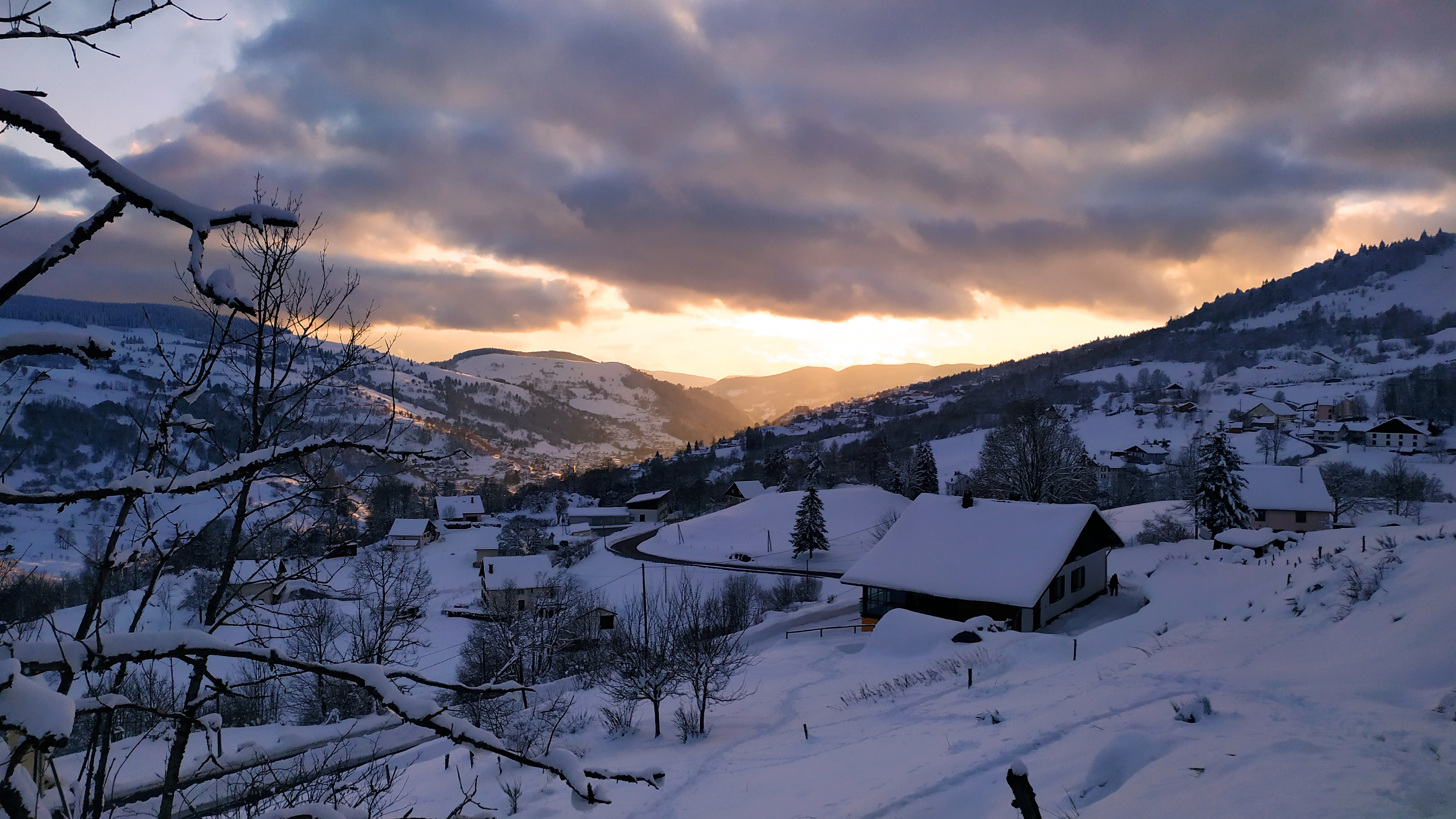
The Vosges mountain range in La Bresse

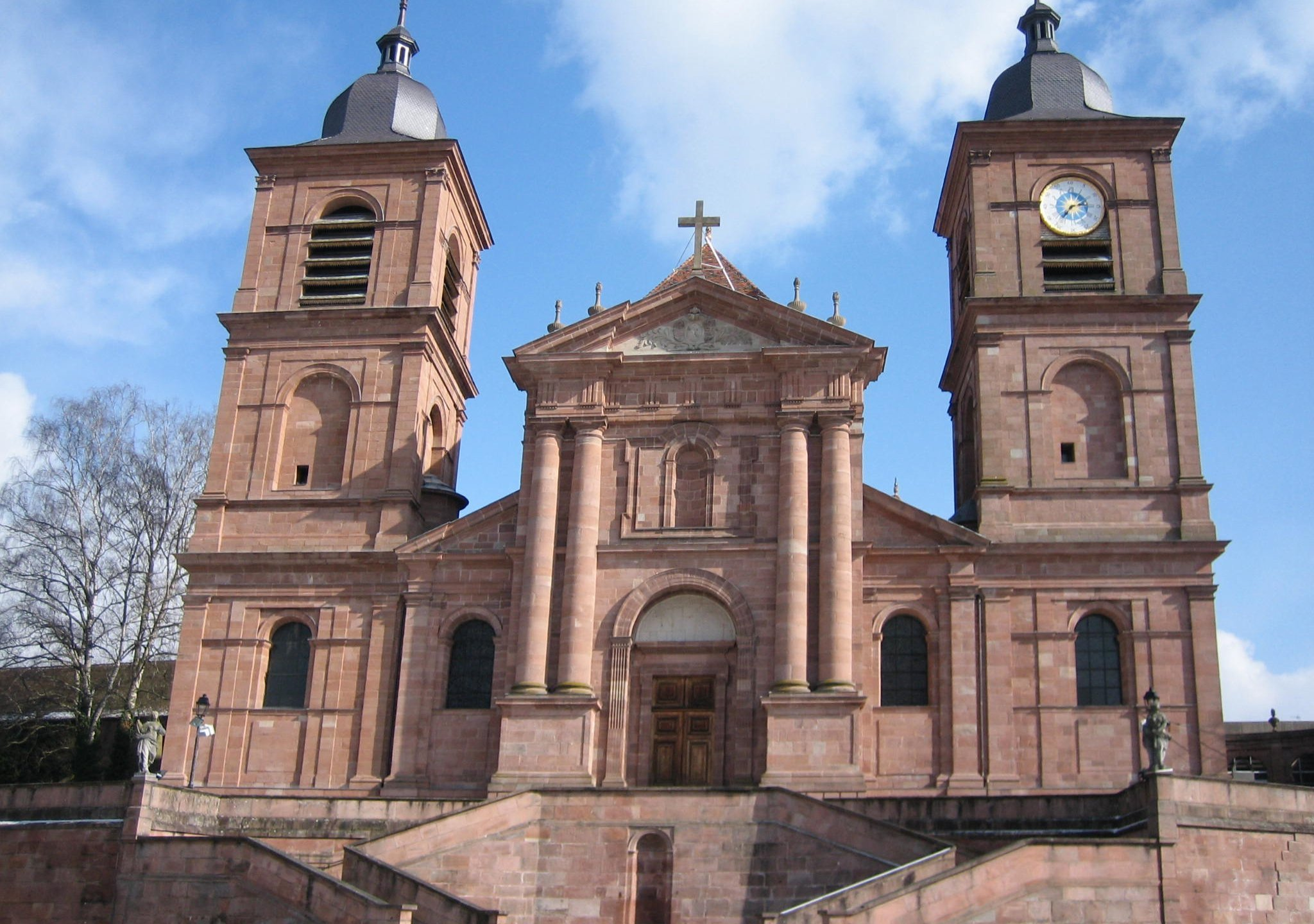
Saint-Dié Cathedral

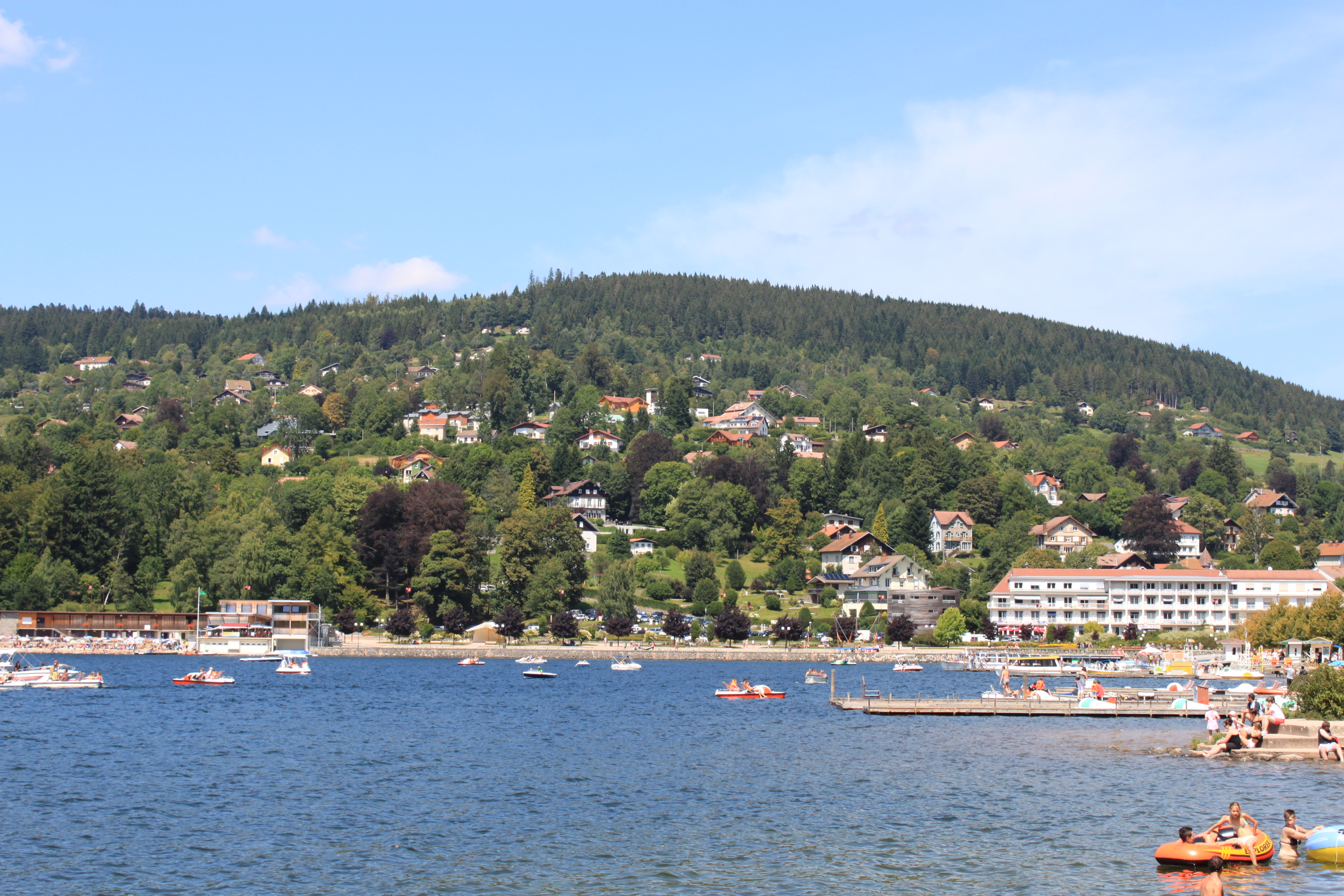
Lac de Gérardmer

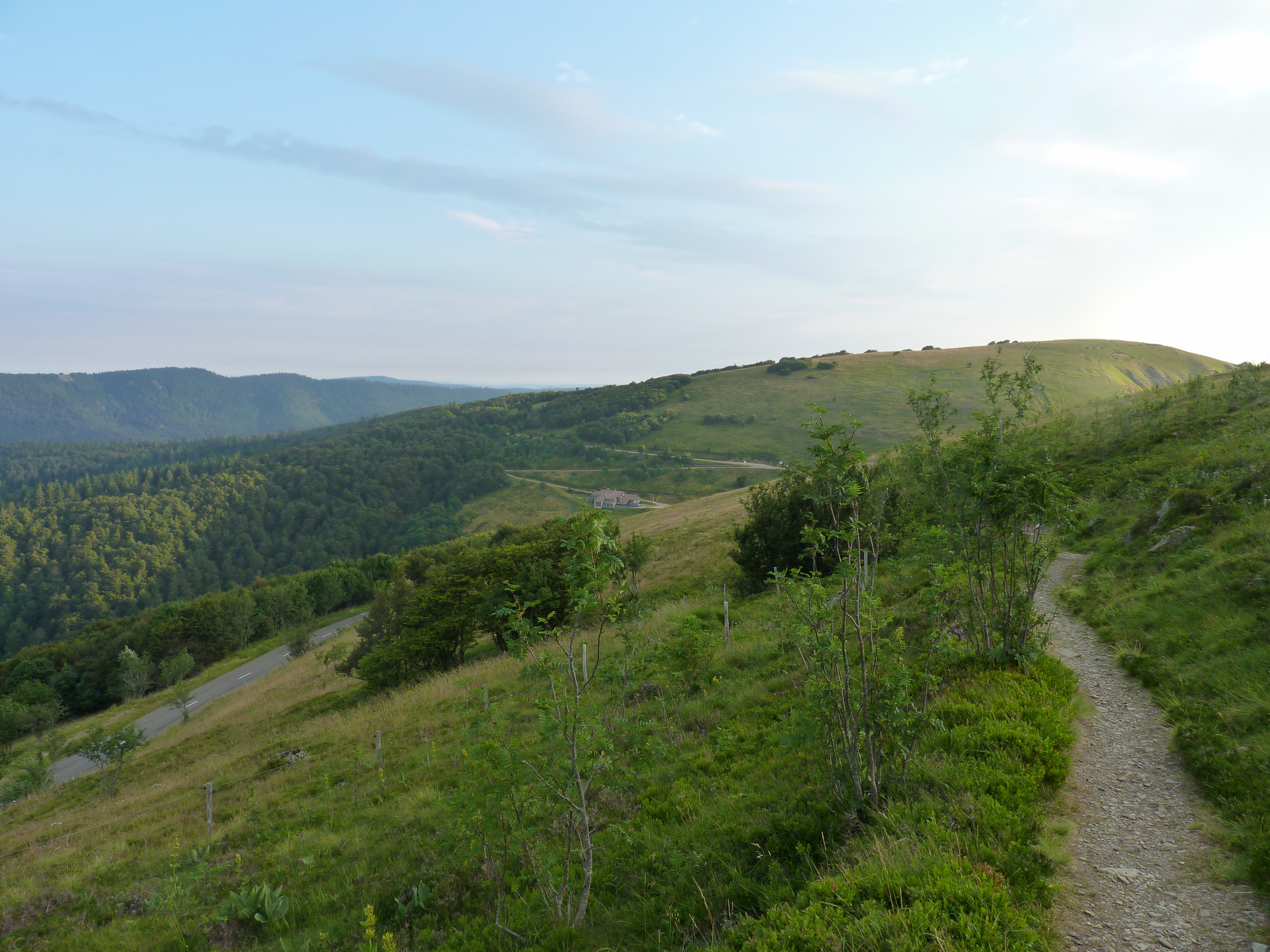
Rainkopf

== See also ==
- Cantons of the Vosges department
- Communes of the Vosges department
- Arrondissements of the Vosges department
