= Michel Heinrich =

French politician

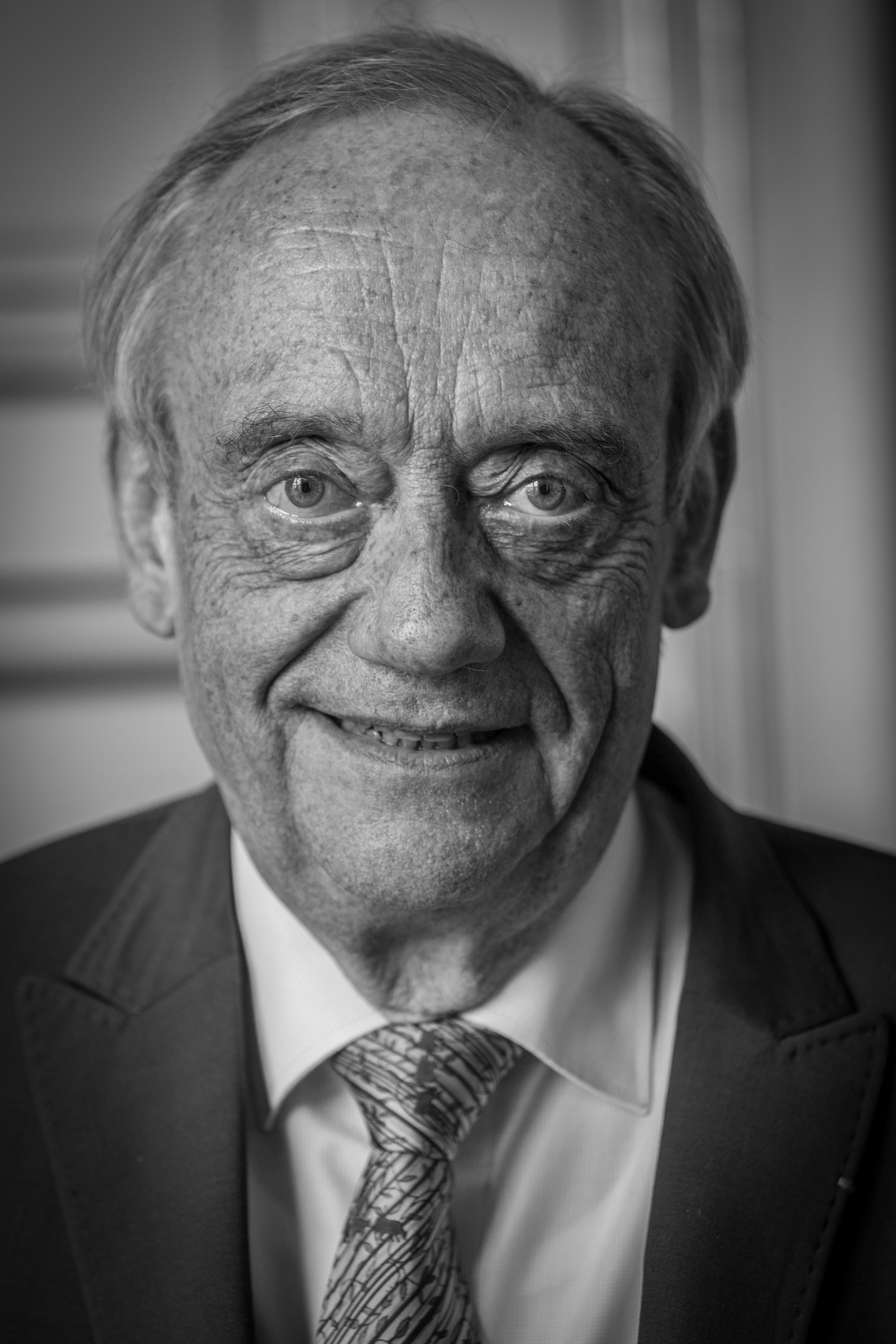
Michel Heinrich (2015)

Michel Heinrich (born February 15, 1946, in Thann, Haut-Rhin) was a member of the National Assembly of France. He represented Vosges' 1st constituency from 2002 to 2017, as a member of the Union for a Popular Movement.
