= Christophe Naegelen =

French politician

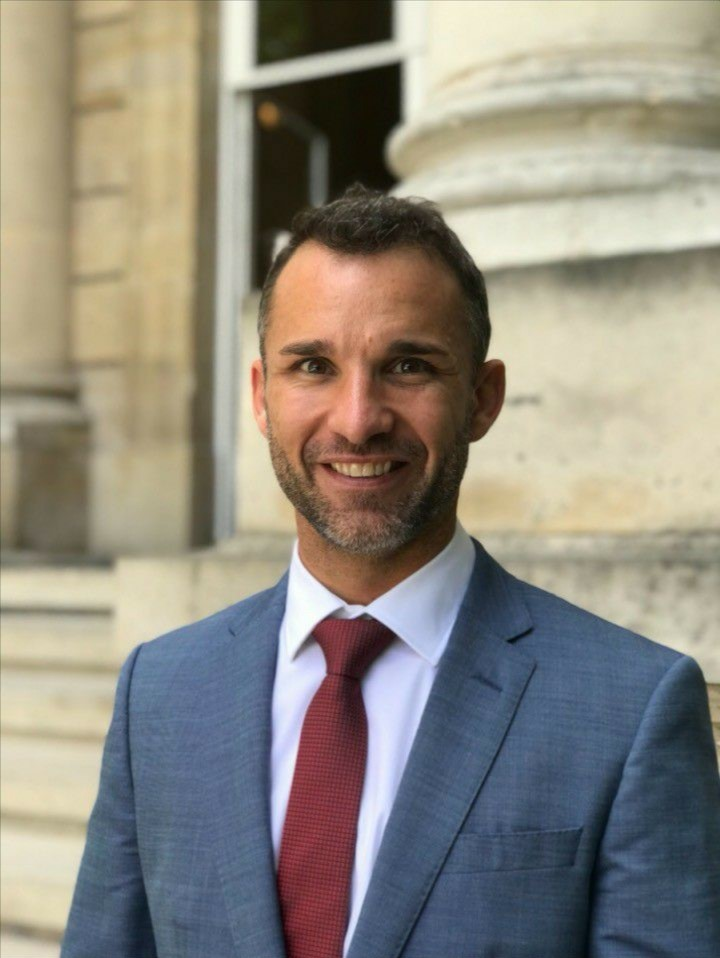
- Christophe Naegelen in 2020

Member of the National Assembly for Vosges's 3rd constituency
- Incumbent
- Assumed office 21 June 2017
- Preceded by: François Vannson

Personal details
- Born: 30 December 1983 (age 42) Remiremont, France
- Party: Independent
- Education: NEOMA Business School

Christophe Naegelen (French pronunciation: [kʁistɔf nɛʒlɛn]; born 30 December 1983) is a French Independent politician who has represented Vosges's 3rd constituency in the National Assembly since 2017.

In parliament, Naegelen has been serving on the Finance Committee since 2020. He has previously been a member of the Committee on Foreign Affairs (2017–2020) and the Committee on Economic Affairs (2018–2020). In addition to his committee assignments, he was part of the French delegation to the Franco-German Parliamentary Assembly from 2019 until 2020.

Since 2019, Naegelen has been part of the UDI and Independents group.
