= François Vannson =

French politician

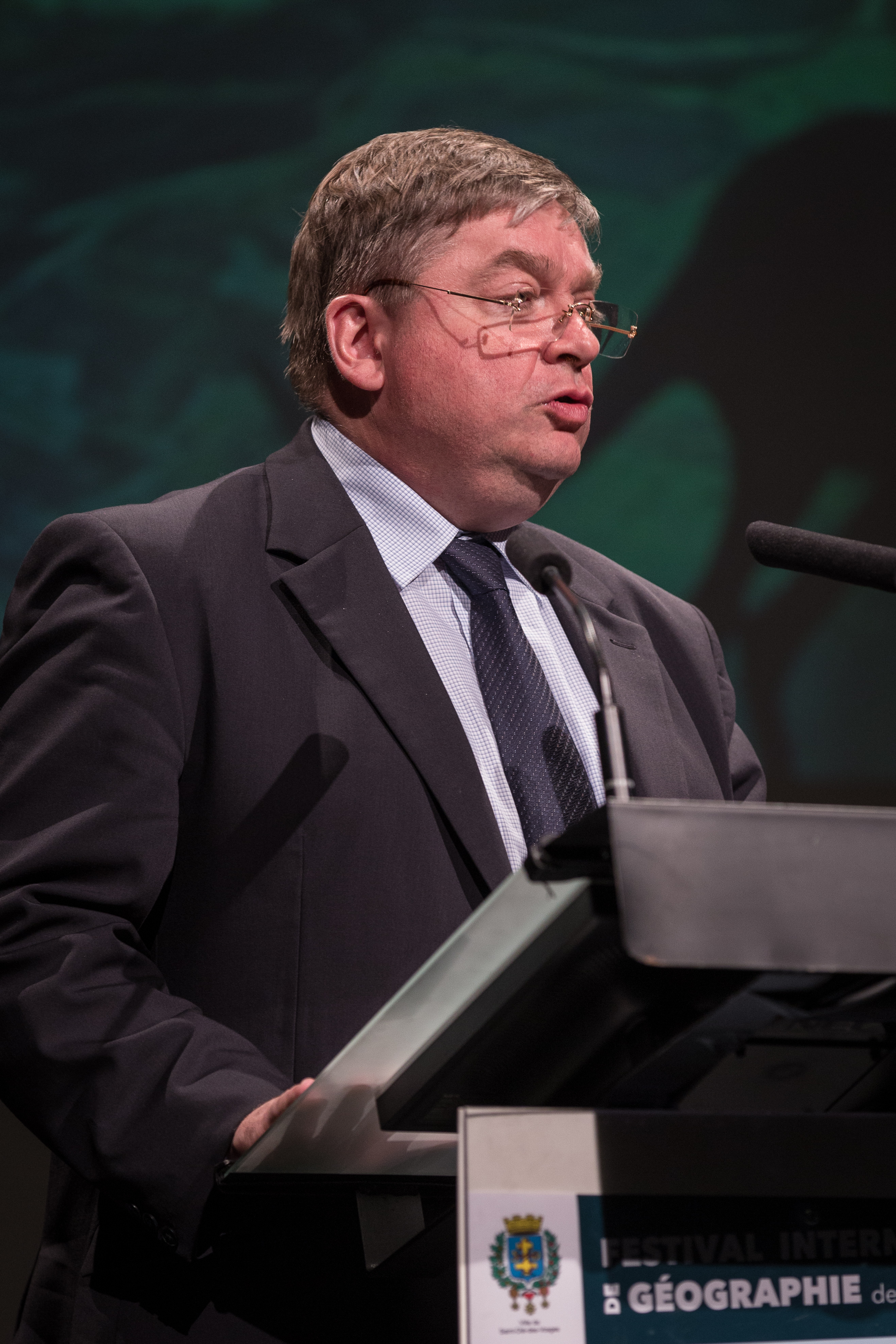
François Vannson in Saint-Dié-des-Vosges, 2015

François Vannson (born 20 October 1962 in Épinal) is a former member of the National Assembly of France. He represented the Vosges department from 1993 to 2017 as a member of the Union for a Popular Movement.
