= David Valence =

French politician (born 1981)

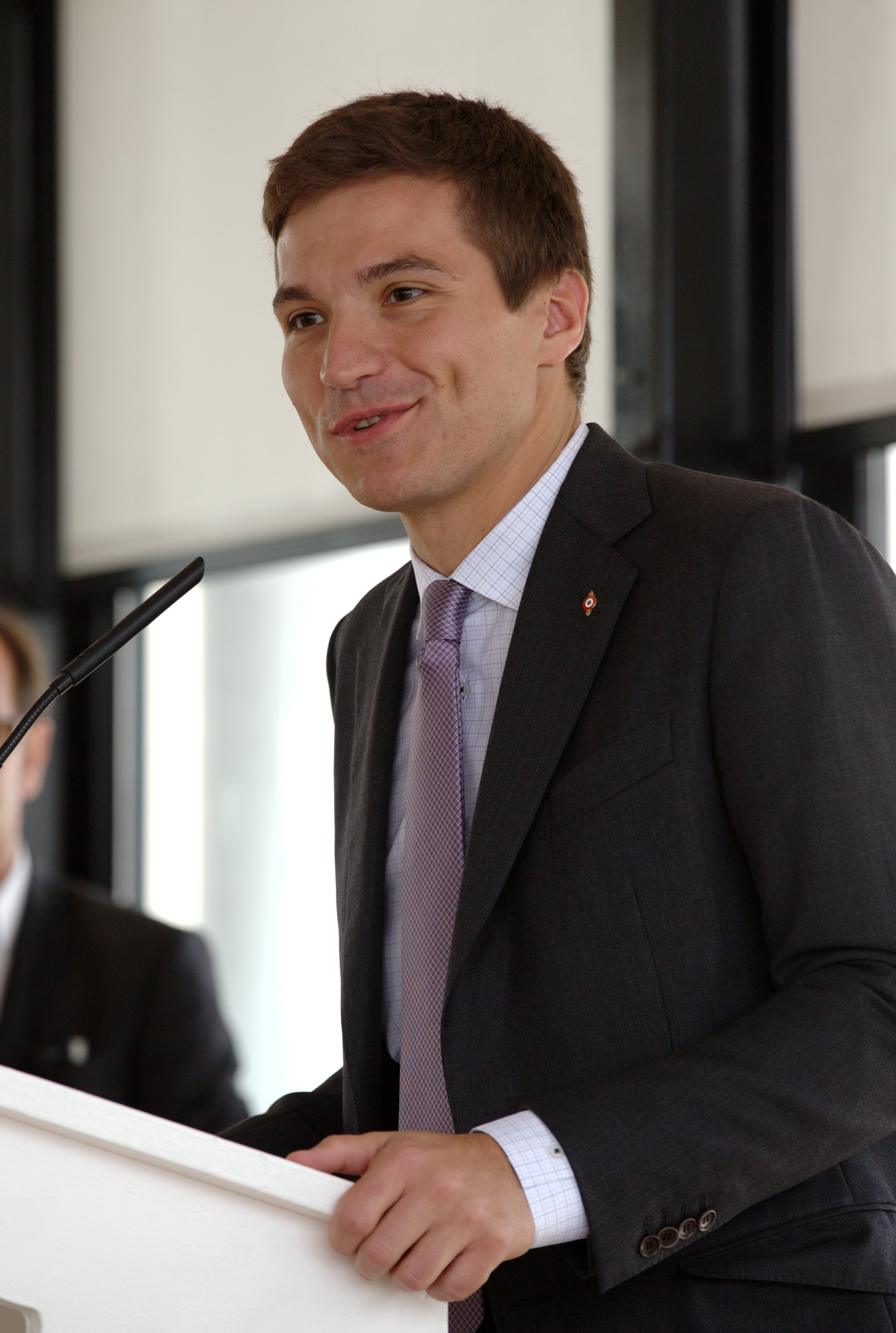
- David Valence in 2022.

Member of the National Assembly for Vosges's 2nd constituency
- In office 22 June 2022 – 22 June 2024
- Preceded by: Gérard Cherpion

Personal details
- Born: 7 October 1981 (age 43); Épinal, France
- Political party: Radical Party

David Valence (born 7 October 1981) is a French politician from the Radical Party who was a Member of Parliament for Vosges's 2nd constituency from 2022 to 2024.

== See also ==
- List of deputies of the 16th National Assembly of France
