= Timadeuc Abbey =

Trappist abbey in Bréhan, Morbihan, Brittany, France

Timadeuc Abbey Abbey of Notre-Dame, Timadeuc
- Abbaye de Timadeuc; Abbaye Notre-Dame de Timadeuc
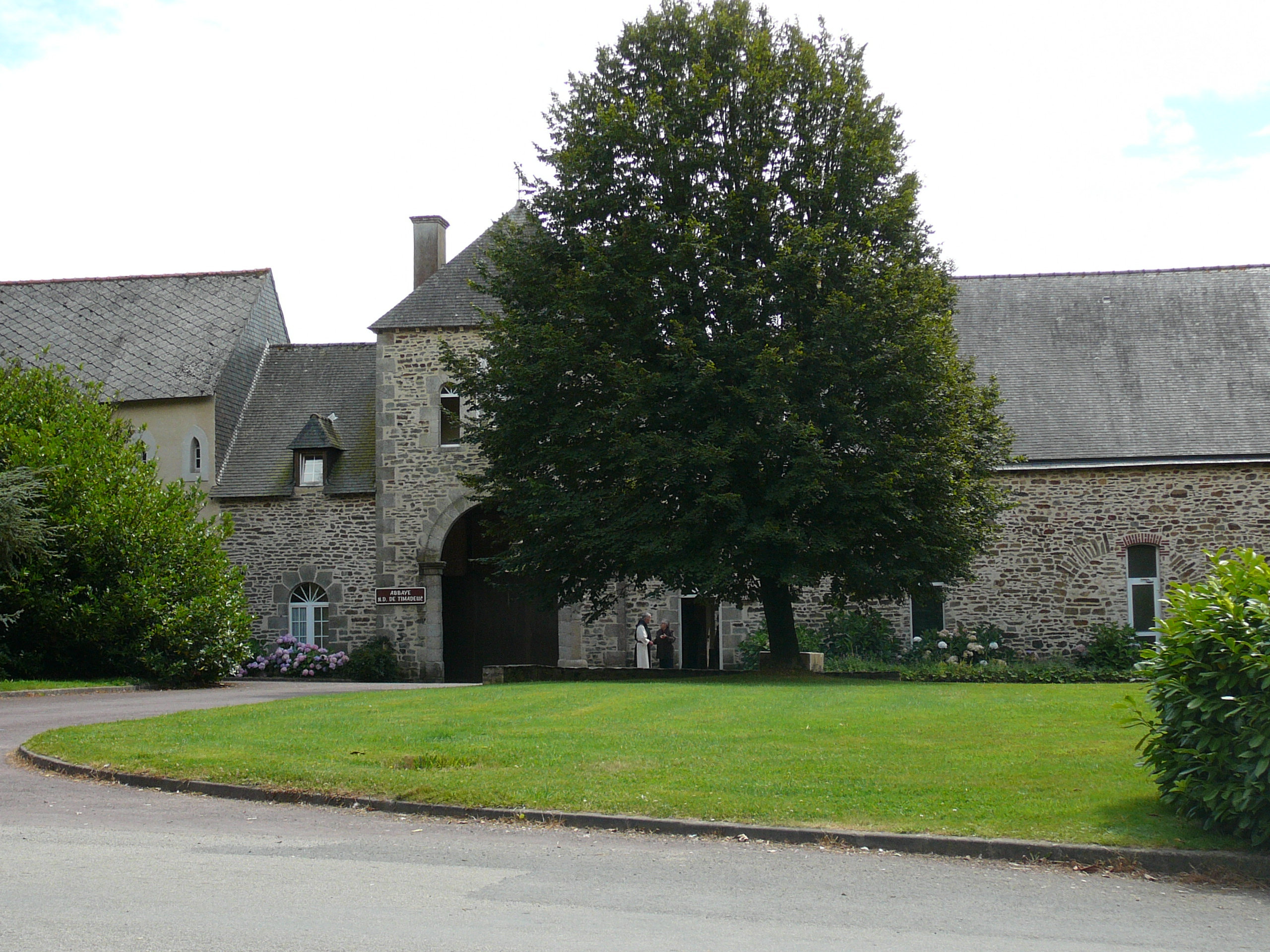

- Location within Morbihan

Religion
- Affiliation: Catholic Church
- Region: Brittany

Location
- Municipality: Bréhan
- State: Morbihan
- Country: France
- Interactive map of Timadeuc Abbey; Abbey of Notre-Dame, Timadeuc
- Coordinates: 48.051206°N 2.722759°W

Architecture
- Type: Abbey
- Groundbreaking: 1841

Website
- http://www.abbaye-timadeuc.fr

Timadeuc Abbey, otherwise the Abbey of Notre-Dame, Timadeuc (French: Abbaye de Timadeuc; Abbaye Notre-Dame de Timadeuc), is a Trappist monastery located in Bréhan, in the Pays des Rohan region of the Morbihan department in Brittany, France. It was founded on 22 July 1841 by three monks from La Trappe Abbey in Perche.

== History ==
=== Early years in the 19th century ===
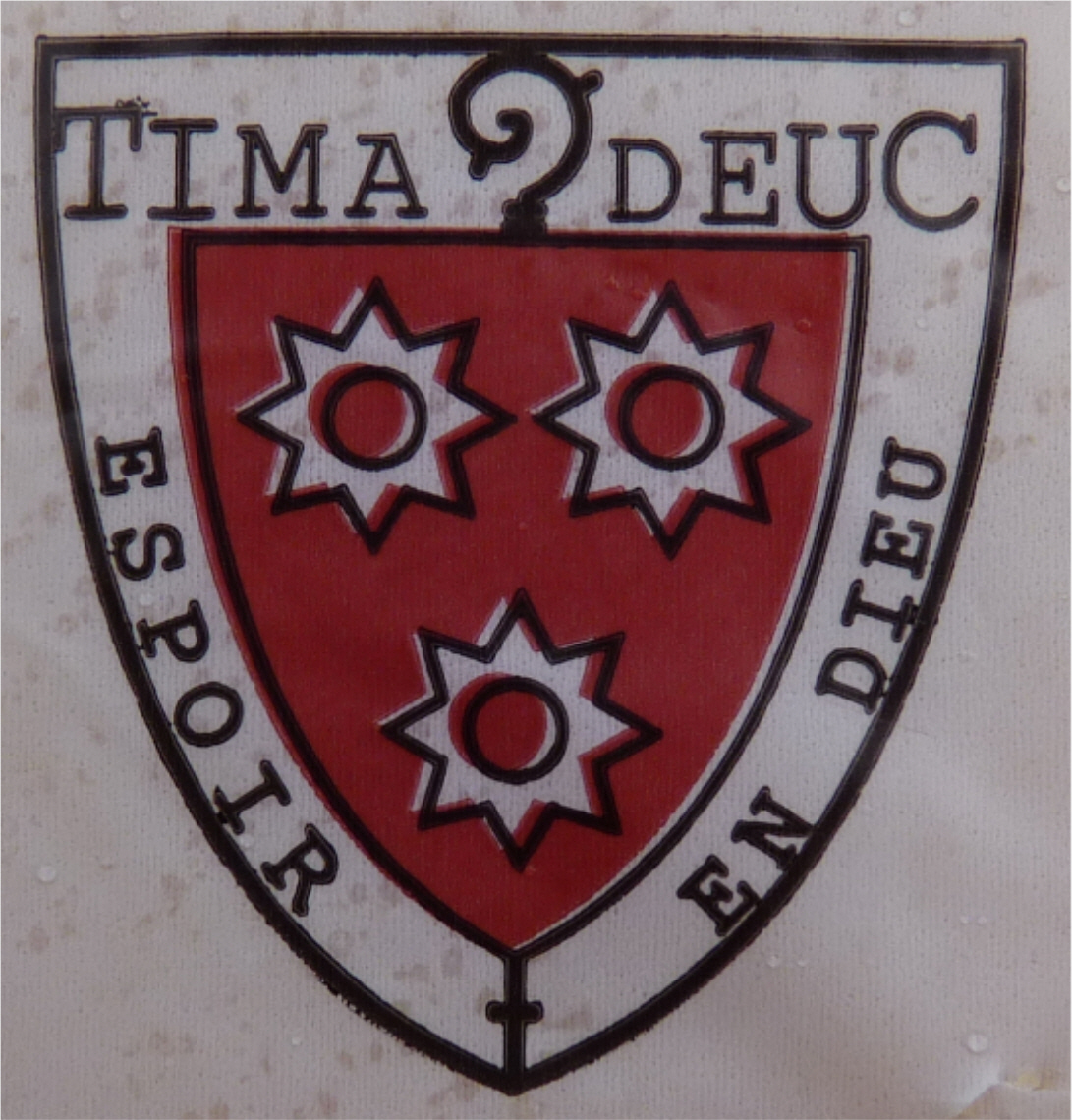
The arms and motto of Timadeuc: "Hope in God"

The abbey's location was chosen because Dom Joseph Hercelin, former director of the Vannes major seminary and abbot of La Trappe, was invited to establish a monastery in his native diocese of Vannes. He declined to acquire Bon-Repos Abbey and instead visited several properties owned by the aging Countess du Bot, who found their management burdensome. These included La Roche du Theil and the former seat of the lordship of Tymadeuc, which he selected. The lordship of Tymadeuc, comprising around fifty holdings, was successively owned by the Tymadeuc family (extinct in 1601), then the Cosquat, Tilly, Jocet, and du Bot families. Hercelin adopted the Tymadeuc motto, "Hope in God", and purchased two nearby tenant farms.

The initial Trappist community at Timadeuc consisted of only three monks — Father Théodore (a deacon), Father Bernard Dugué (abbot until his death in 1859), and Brother Gérard (a lay brother) — who arrived on foot with a horse and cart on 22 July 1841. With limited resources, the community relied on the generosity of the Countess du Bot, who sold the dilapidated Timadeuc manor at a low price to establish the monastery. According to Father Félix, the Timadeuc archivist, the price was high relative to the condition of the buildings and land, so the Countess was not considered a founder. The monks temporarily resided at the nearby Château de Quengo, provided free of charge, while making Timadeuc habitable.

Construction of the priory and its buildings took place from 1842 to 1846, using materials from the ruins of Rohan Castle. The church's foundation stone was laid on 1 April 1842, and it was consecrated on 1 September 1846. In 1847, a papal rescript elevated the priory to abbey status, naming it Notre-Dame de Thymadeuc. The conventual buildings were completed in 1860, though the cloister remained unfinished.

On 2 November 1845, François-Marie Cayot-Délandre visited the abbey and documented the monks' austere lifestyle: rising at 2 a.m. for the Salve Regina, attending Mass, working, and eating a single meatless meal in silence while listening to spiritual readings. Monks slept on plank beds without mattresses in doorless cells and had no contact with their families, even in cases of death.

=== Turbulent history (1863–1914) ===
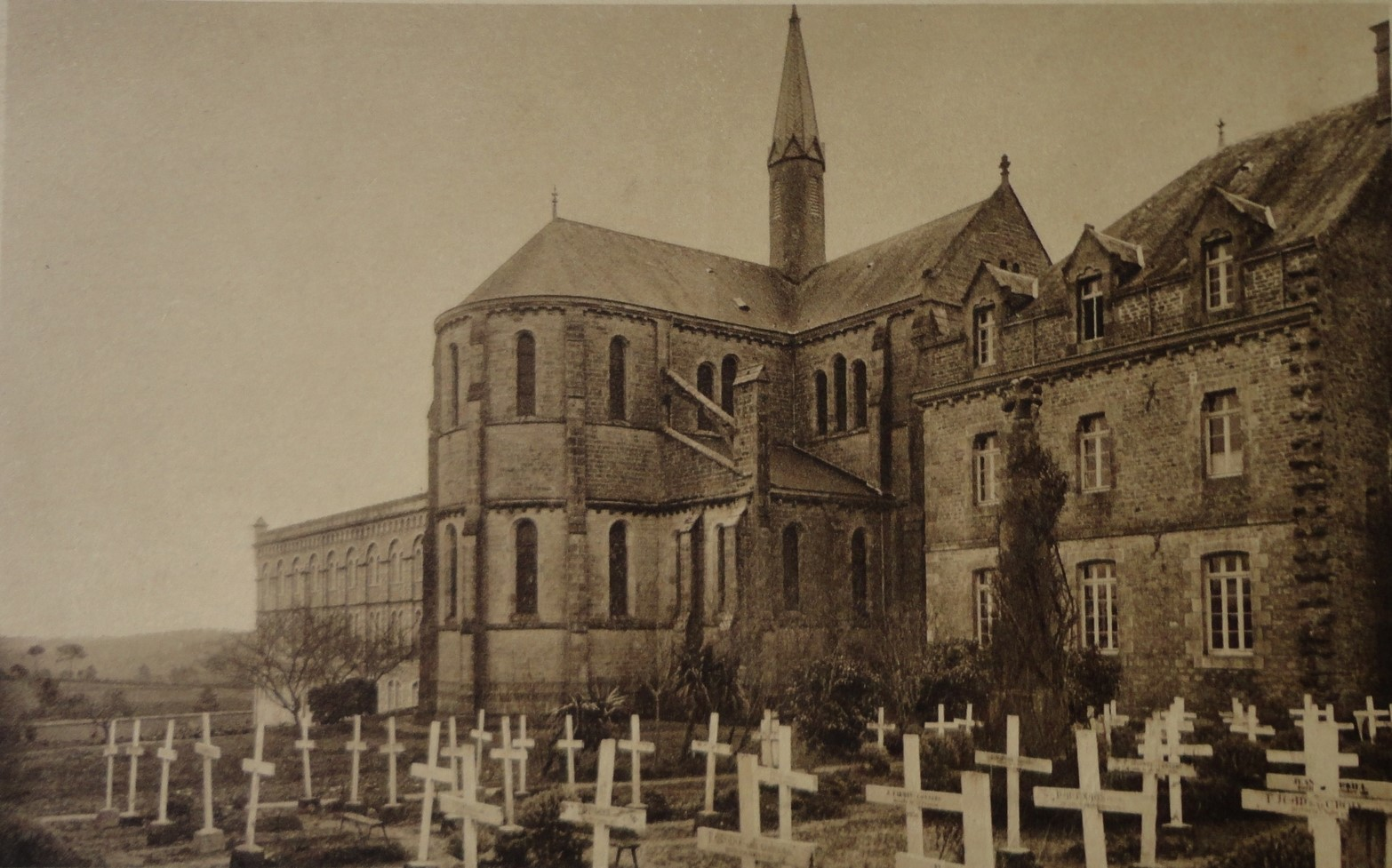
Timadeuc Abbey and its burial ground, circa 1910

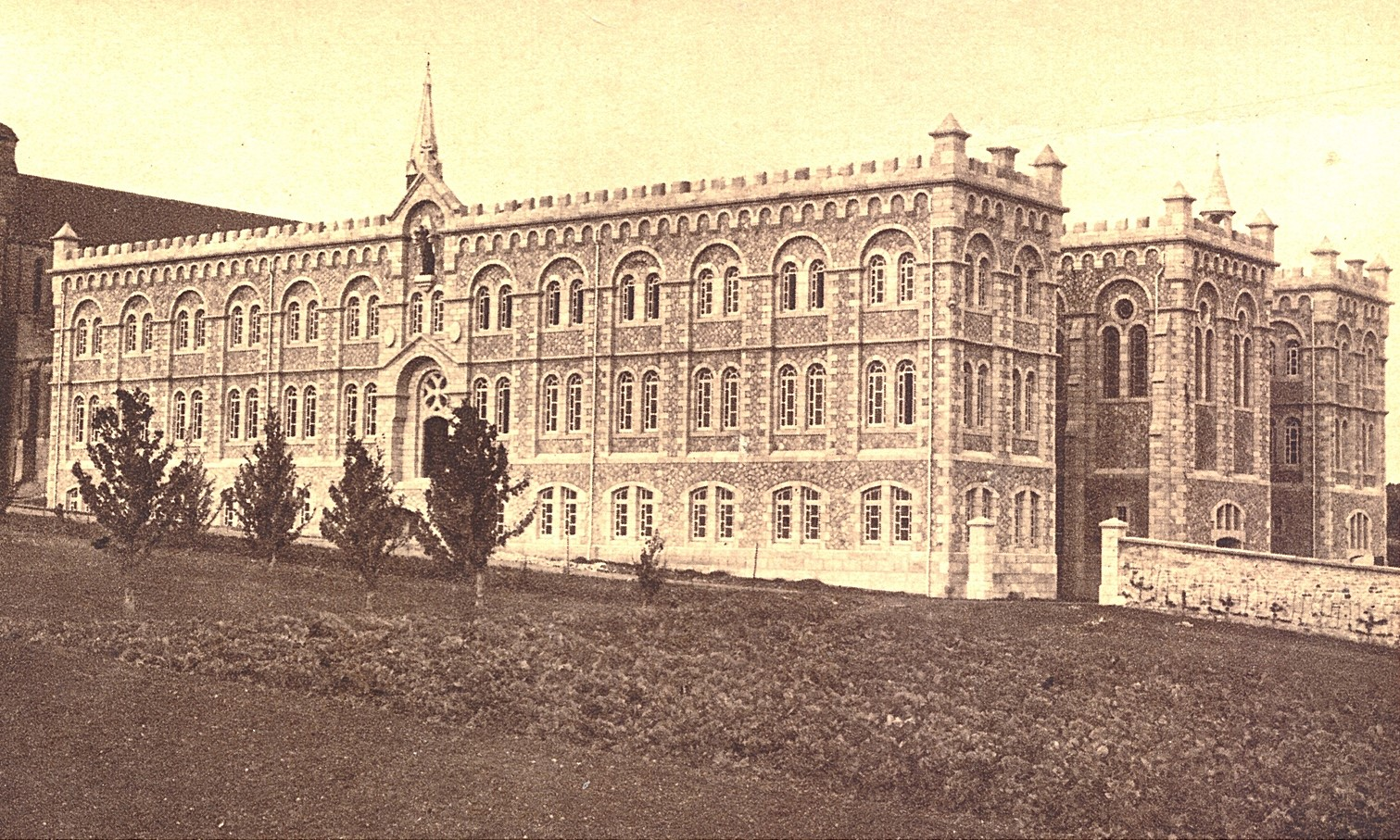
Timadeuc Abbey in the early 20th century

The abbey's history was marked by challenges, including a criminal arson attack in 1863 that caused damages exceeding 200,000 francs and an expulsion in 1880 under an anti-clerical decree by the Third Republic on 29 March, banning religious habits and communal life. The monks returned on 1 December 1882 after the decree was lifted. In 1895, the original church was demolished, and a new Gothic Revival church was built from 1895 to 1898. Its foundation stone, inscribed with the year 1895, contained a lead heart with medals of the Virgin Mary, Saint Joseph, Saint Benedict, Saint Anne, and the Guardian Angel. Dedicated to Our Lady of the Assumption, the church's pediment displays the Timadeuc arms ("gules, three spur-rowels argent") and the abbey's mitre and crosier.

The 1905 Law on the Separation of Church and State threatened the abbey's existence, prompting twelve monks to relocate to Notre-Dame du Petit Clairvaux in Canada in 1903 to prepare for potential exile, which did not occur. The definitive monastery buildings were constructed between 1925 and 1930.

=== Timadeuc during World War II ===
During World War II, the abbey was a significant hub of the French Resistance, led by Abbot Dom Dominique Nogues, an agent of the Pat O'Leary Line. The abbey sheltered airmen, resistance fighters, and weapons caches, and several monks were arrested. Father Gwenaël (Jean Thomas, born 27 November 1889 in Plougastel-Daoulas), who hid resistance members and arms, was arrested, tortured, and died on 3 January 1945 at Neuengamme concentration camp. Other monks, including Father Gabriel Bourdier (prior from 1943), Father Alain Christian, and Father Louis de Gonzague (an expert in forging identity papers), escaped arrest. The abbey's contributions earned it the French Resistance Medal in 1946 and a calvary in Bréhan commemorating its role.

== List of abbots ==
- Bernard Dugué (1847–1859)
- Cyprien Morel (1859–1887)
- Bernard Chevalier (1888–1912)
- Brieuc Boutmy (1912–1922)
- Dominique Nogues (1922–1946)
- Gabriel Blourdier (1946–1954)
- Emmanuel de Miscault (1954–1971)
- Claude Richard (1971–1993)
- Paul Houix (1993–2011, resigned at age 75 per monastic rule; led a community of 31 monks in 2008; died 28 August 2015)
- Benoît Briand (2011–present)
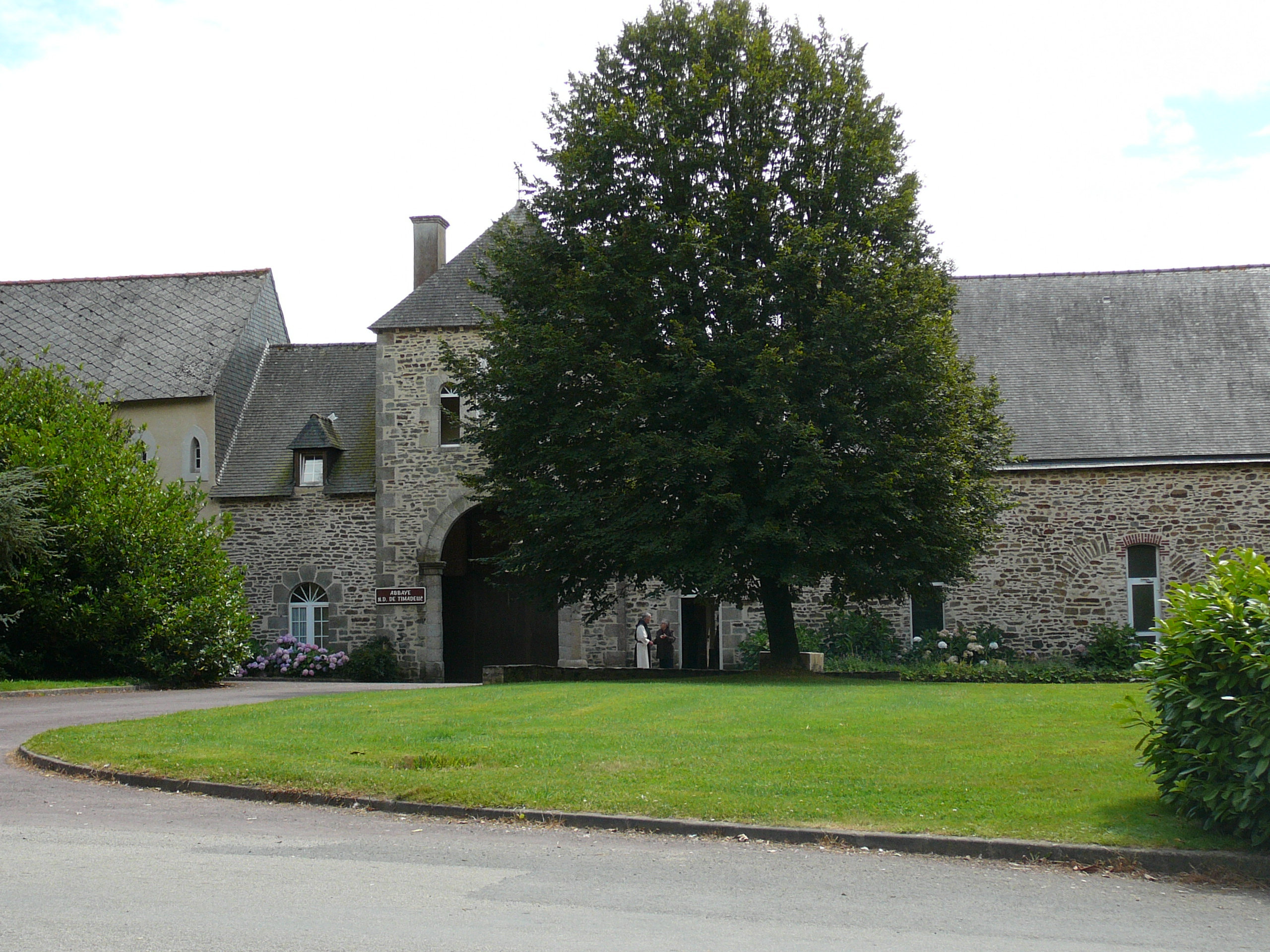
Porterie of the abbey, housing a shop

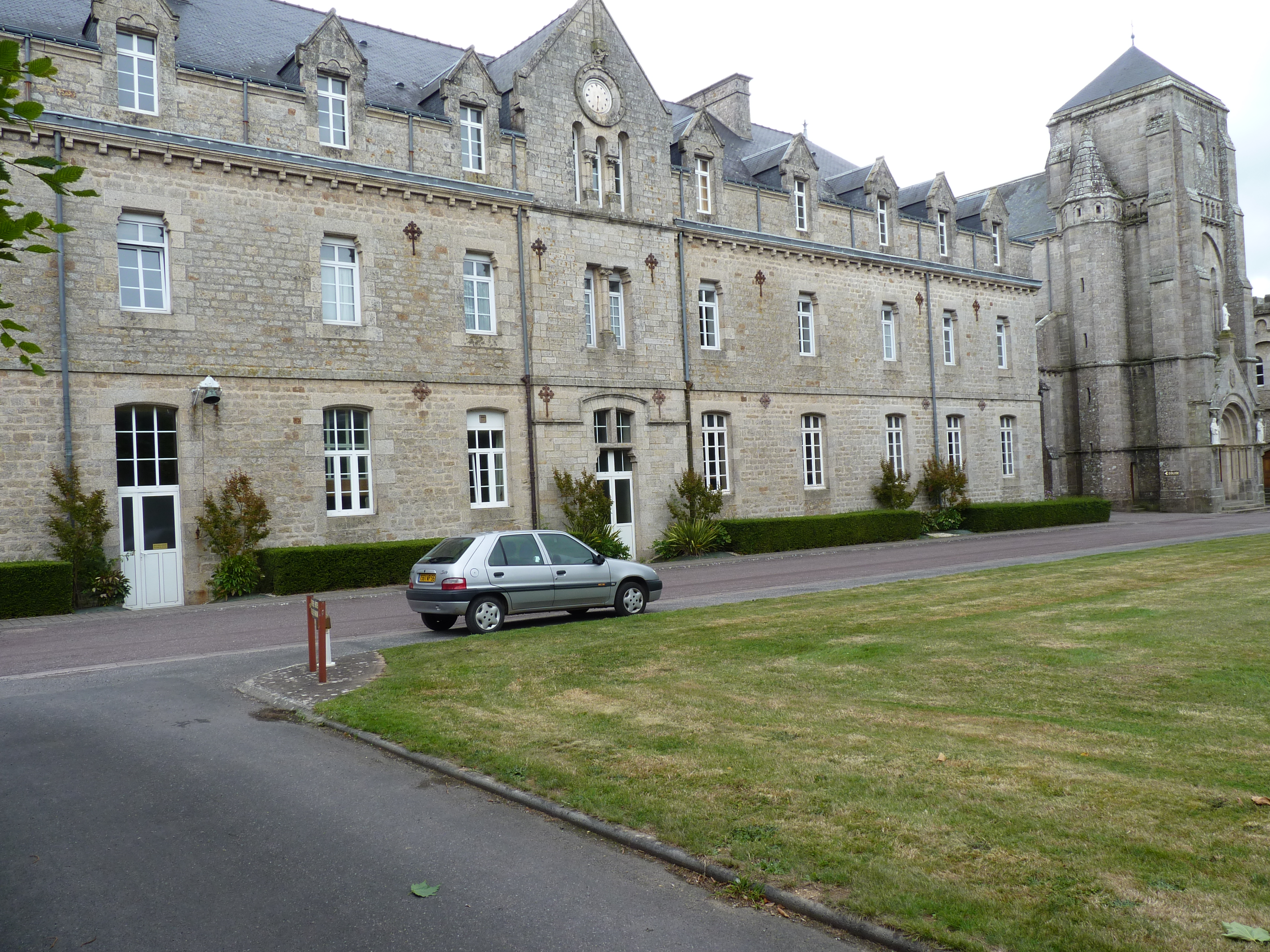
Original façade (1860) of the guest house

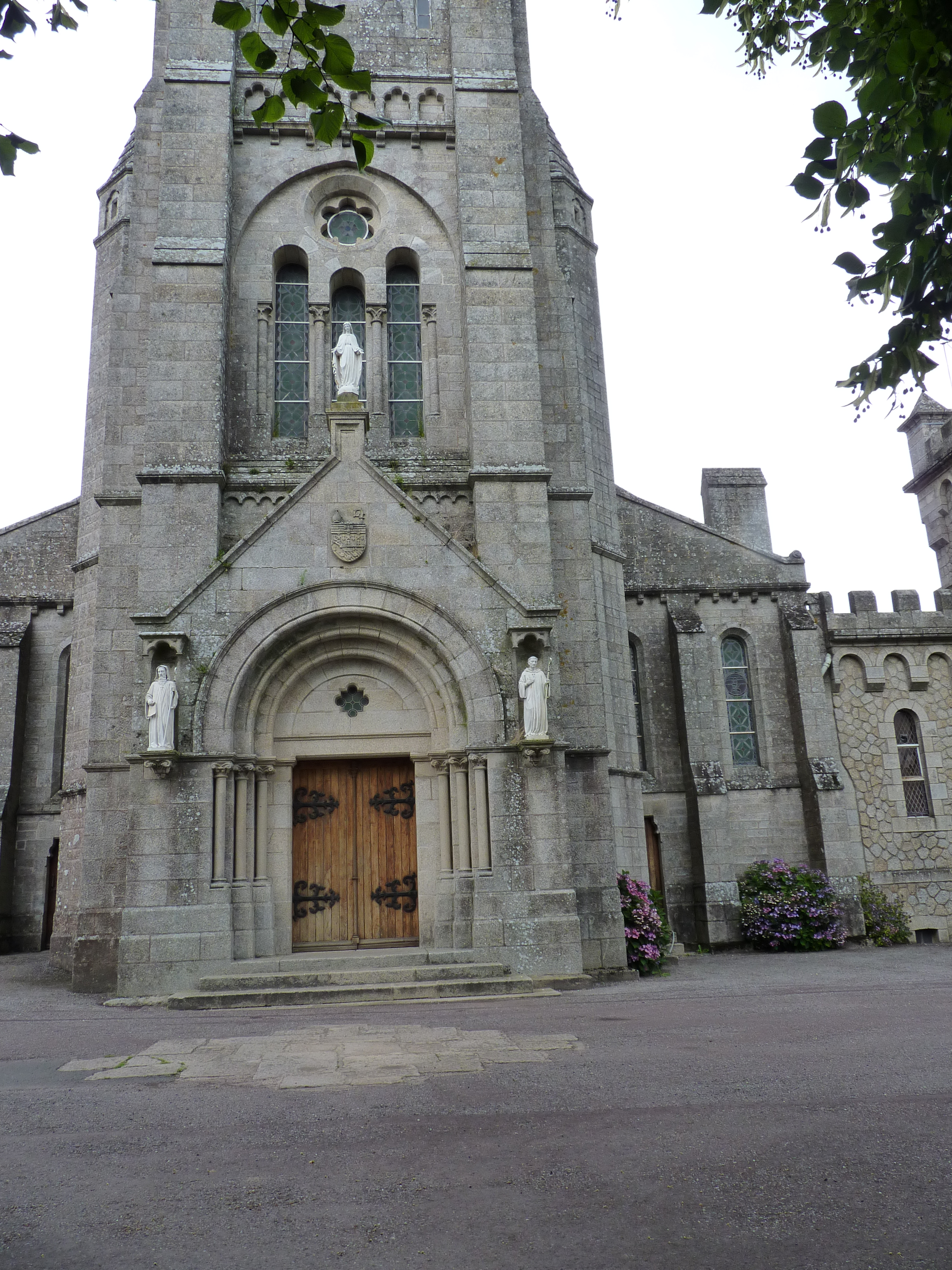
Abbey church Our Lady of the Assumption

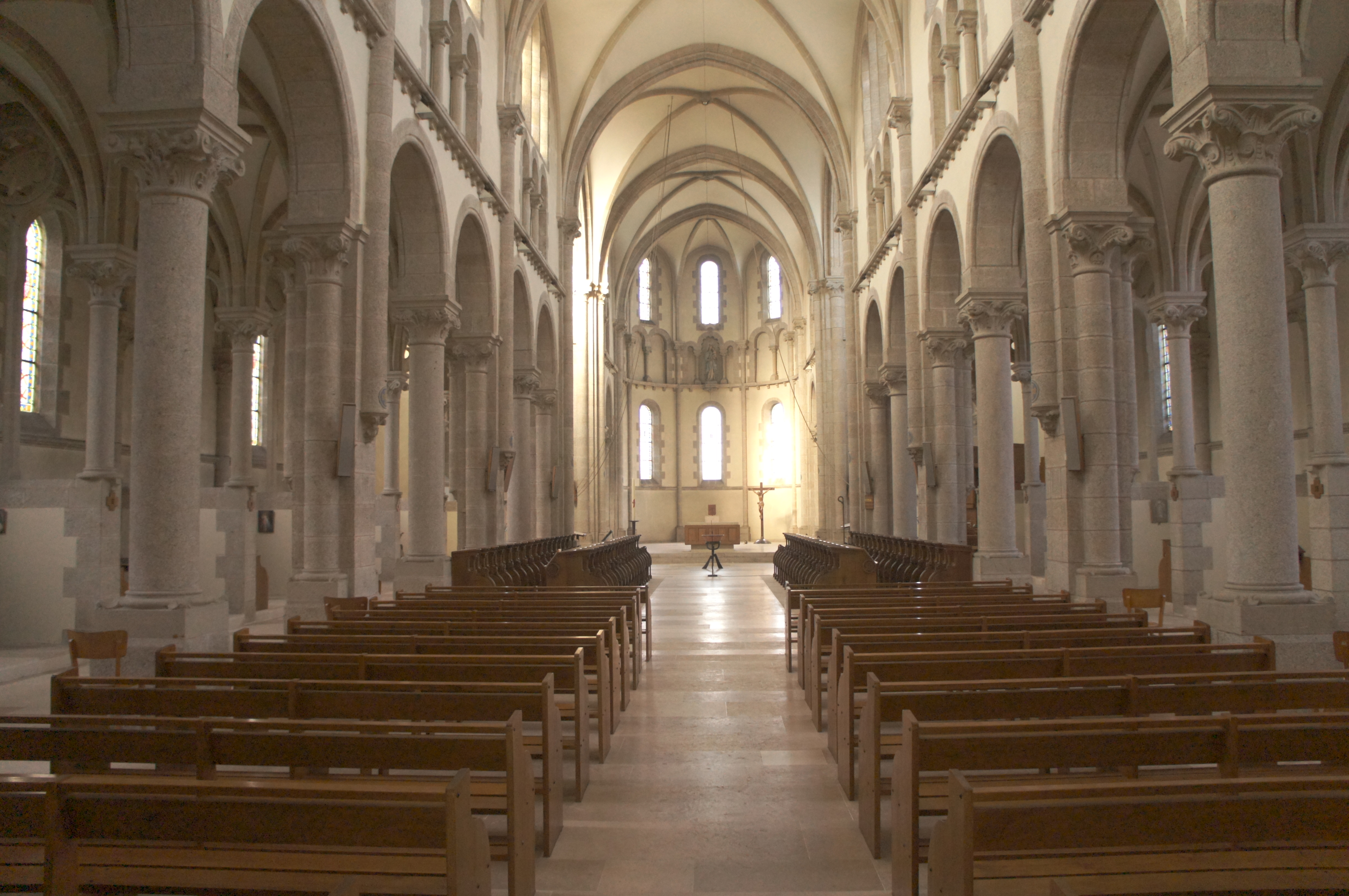
Nave of the abbey church

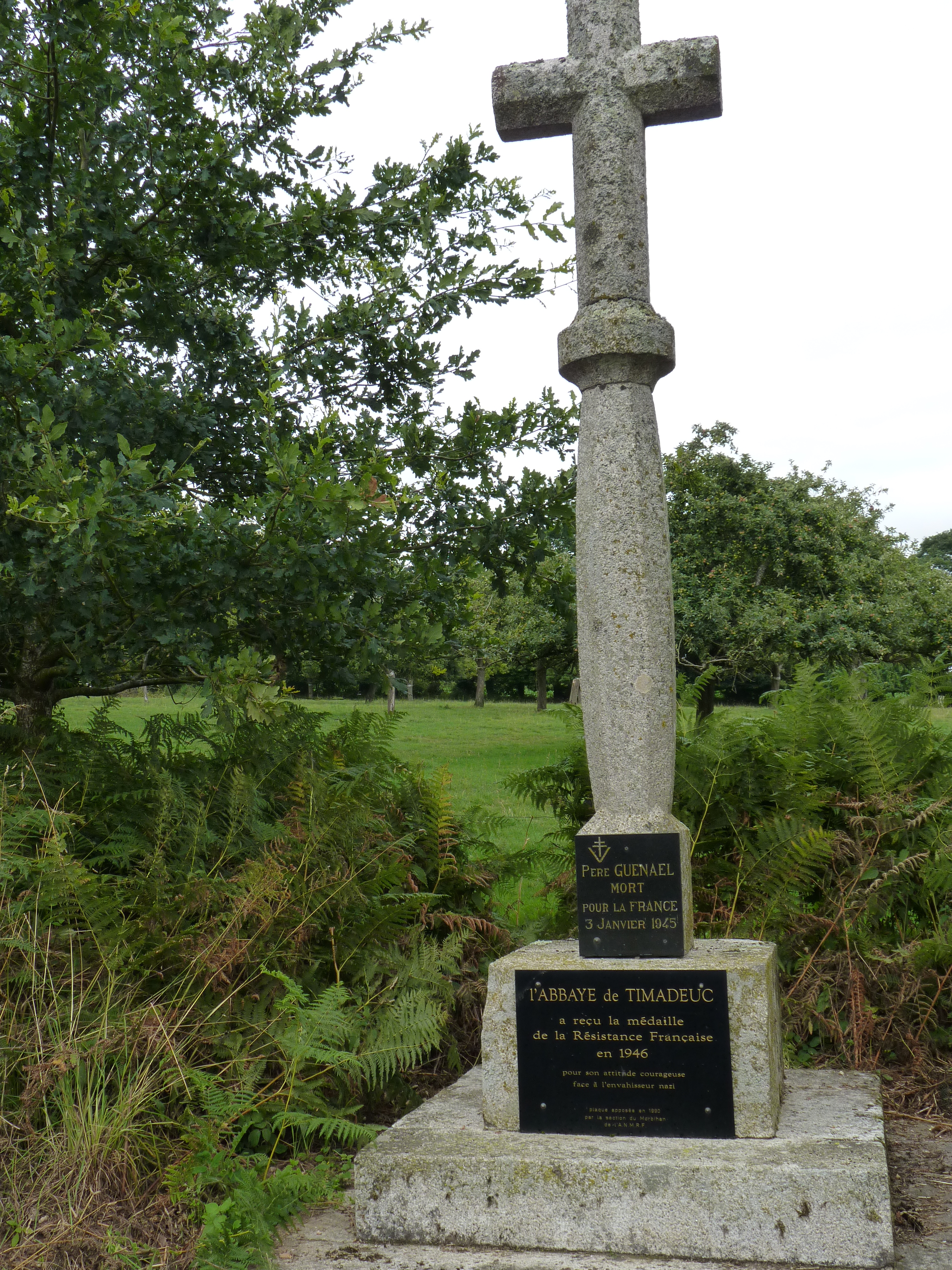
Calvary of Timadeuc

== Activities and productions ==
=== Prayer life ===
Despite its remote location, the abbey is a popular destination for prayer and Gregorian chant, with the community having recorded several albums. Monks follow a daily schedule of three sets of collective prayers (Vigils and Lauds in the morning, Sext and None in the afternoon, Vespers and Compline in the evening), plus Mass, two three-hour work periods, and personal prayer (lectio divina).

=== Artisanal activities ===
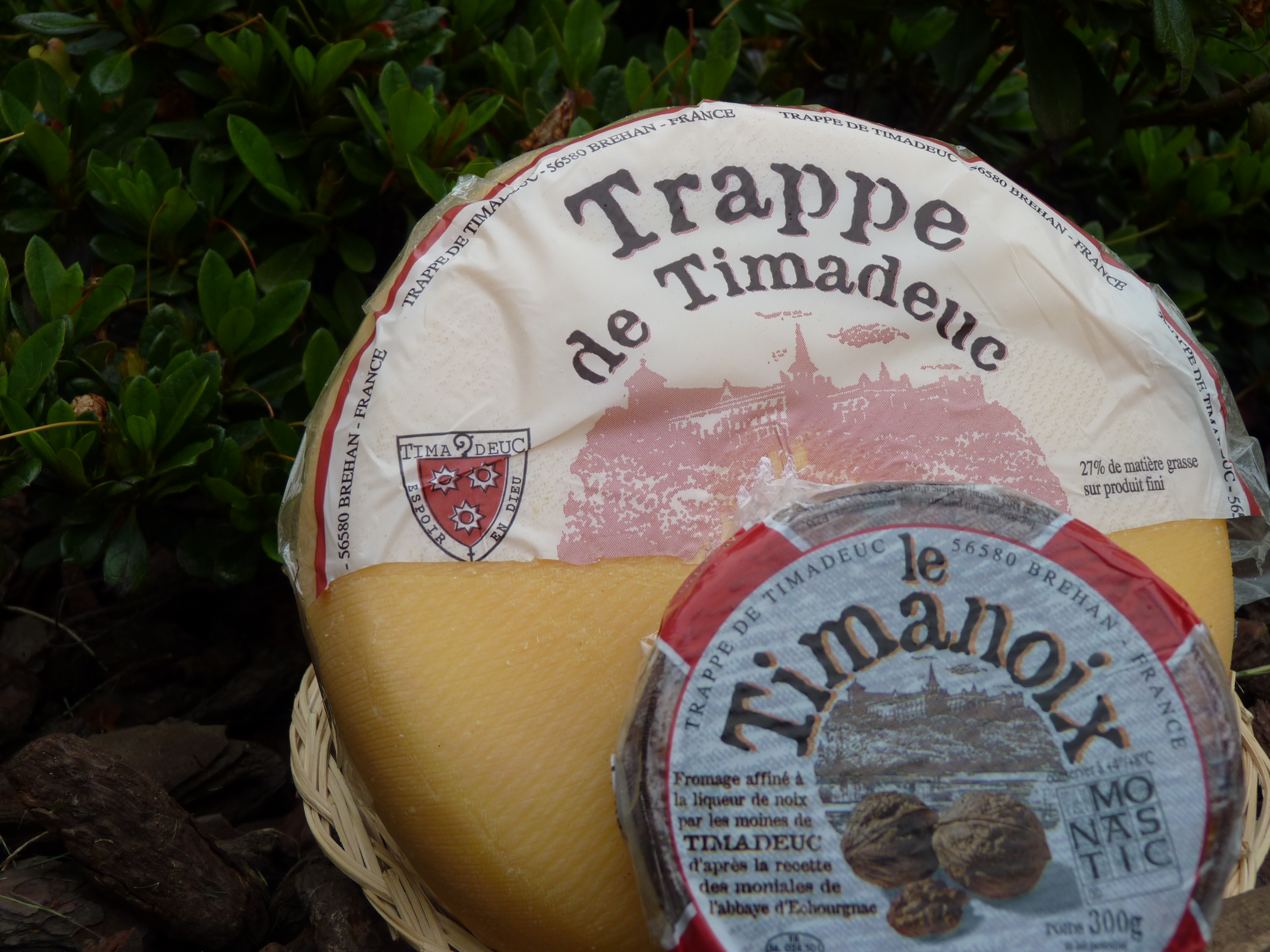
Cheeses branded Trappe de Timadeuc and Le Timanoix

The abbey's primary income comes from artisanal food production. Due to the community's aging population, farming has been discontinued, and the land is leased to a local farmer. Cheesemaking is partially outsourced to the dairy industry, with the monks retaining only the artisanal aging process. Their products include Trappe de Timadeuc, a pasteurized cow's milk cheese, and Le Timanoix, aged with walnut liqueur, a recipe inherited from the nuns of Échourgnac Abbey, originally founded by monks from Port-du-Salut Abbey. The monks also produce fruit paste from their orchard fruits. Both cheeses and fruit pastes carry the "Monastic" brand.

== Bibliography ==
- Auboiroux, Alain (2015). Abbaye Notre-Dame de Timadeuc [Notre-Dame de Timadeuc Abbey] (in French). Le Golvic: Éditions CDP. p. 48. ISBN 9782351300879.
