= Charles de Courson =

French politician (born 1952)

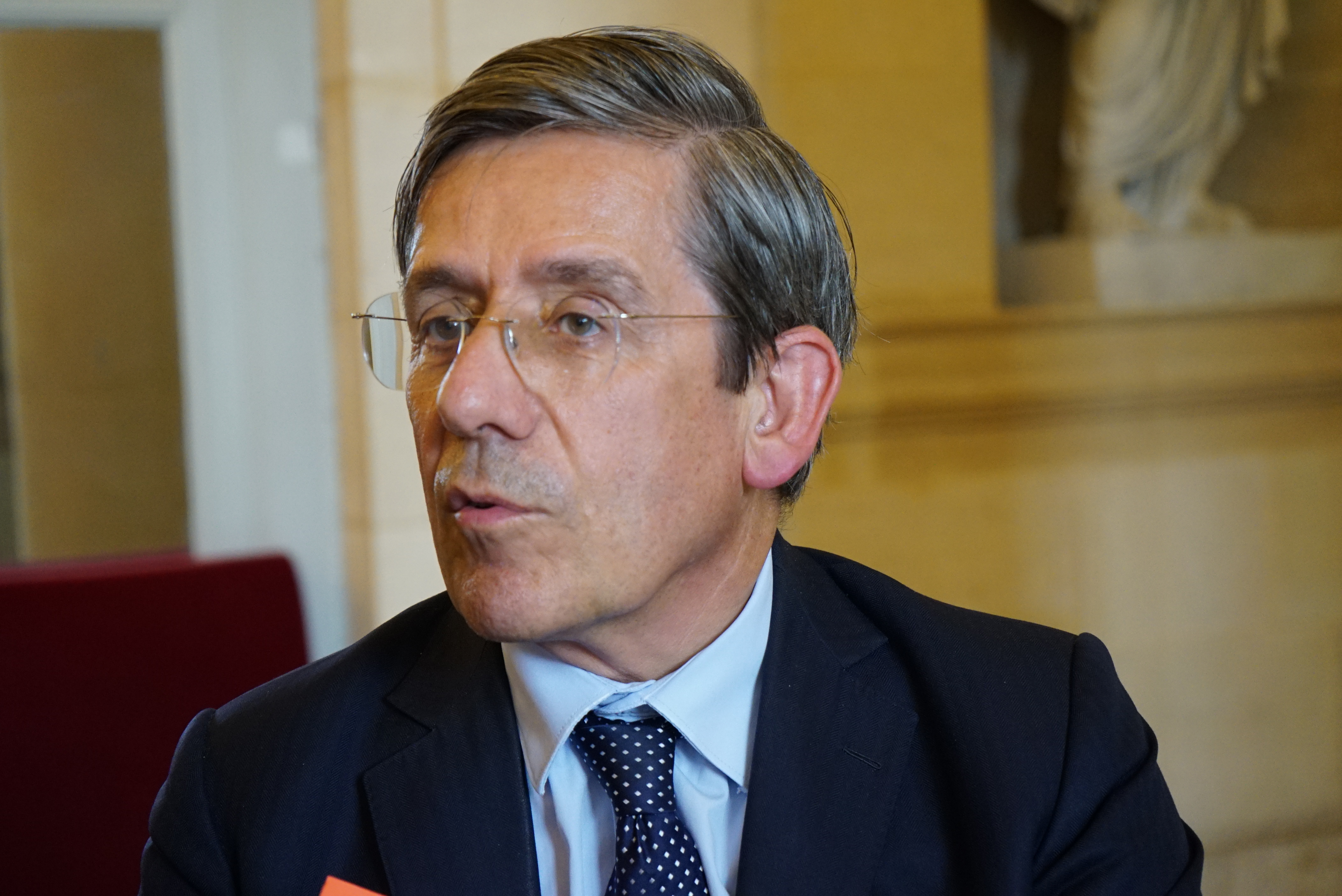
- Charles de Courson in 2017

Member of the National Assembly for Marne's 5th constituency
- Incumbent
- Assumed office 2 April 1993
- Preceded by: Jean-Pierre Bouquet

Mayor of Vanault-les-Dames
- In office 15 January 1986 – 14 October 2017
- Preceded by: Aymard de Courson
- Succeeded by: Caroline Issenhuth

Personal details
- Born: Charles Amédée Simon du Buisson de Courson; 2 April 1952 (age 74) Paris, France
- Party: LC-NC (2007–present)
- Other political affiliations: CDS (1986–1995); FD (1995–1998); UDF (1998–2007); UDI (2012–2017)
- Relations: Léonel de Moustier (grandfather); Louis-Michel le Peletier (ancestor); Elénor-François-Elie (ancestor)
- Education: ESSEC Business School; École nationale d'administration
- Occupation: Magistrate • Politician

Charles Amédée Simon du Buisson de Courson (French pronunciation: [ʃaʁl amede simɔ̃ dy bɥisɔ̃ də kuʁsɔ̃]; born 2 April 1952) is a French politician who has represented the 5th constituency of the Marne department in the National Assembly since 1993. A member of The Centrists (LC), he sits with the Liberties, Independents, Overseas and Territories (LIOT) group. He has been rapporteur of the state budget in the National Assembly since 2024.

Since 2022, he has been the longest-serving deputy in the National Assembly. Prior to entering politics, he worked as a civil servant at the Auditors Court and Finance Ministry.

== Early life and family ==
Charles Amédée Simon du Buisson de Courson was born on 2 April 1952, in the 16th arrondissement of Paris.

Coat of arms of the Buisson de Courson family

His father, Aymard de Courson, a Popular Republican Movement (MRP) politician, held the mayorship of Vanault-les-Dames from 1953 to 1985 and represented the canton of Heiltz-le-Maurupt in the General Council of Marne from 1958 to 1985, when he died.

Through his father, Charles de Courson is a grandson of Captain Félix Marie Robert du Buisson de Courson of the 308th Infantry Regiment, Mort pour la France at the 1916 Battle of the Somme. His paternal grandmother, Germaine Charlotte Lhuillier, was deported to Bergen-Belsen concentration camp in Germany amid World War II, where she died in 1945.

Through his mother, Charles de Courson is a grandson of politician Léonel de Moustier, who was also deported to Germany, where he died at Neuengamme concentration camp in 1945. He is also a descendant of politician Louis-Michel le Peletier and diplomat Elénor-François-Elie.

== Political career ==
De Courson succeeded his father both as mayor and general councillor in 1986. In 1993, he was elected to the National Assembly in the 5th constituency of Marne.

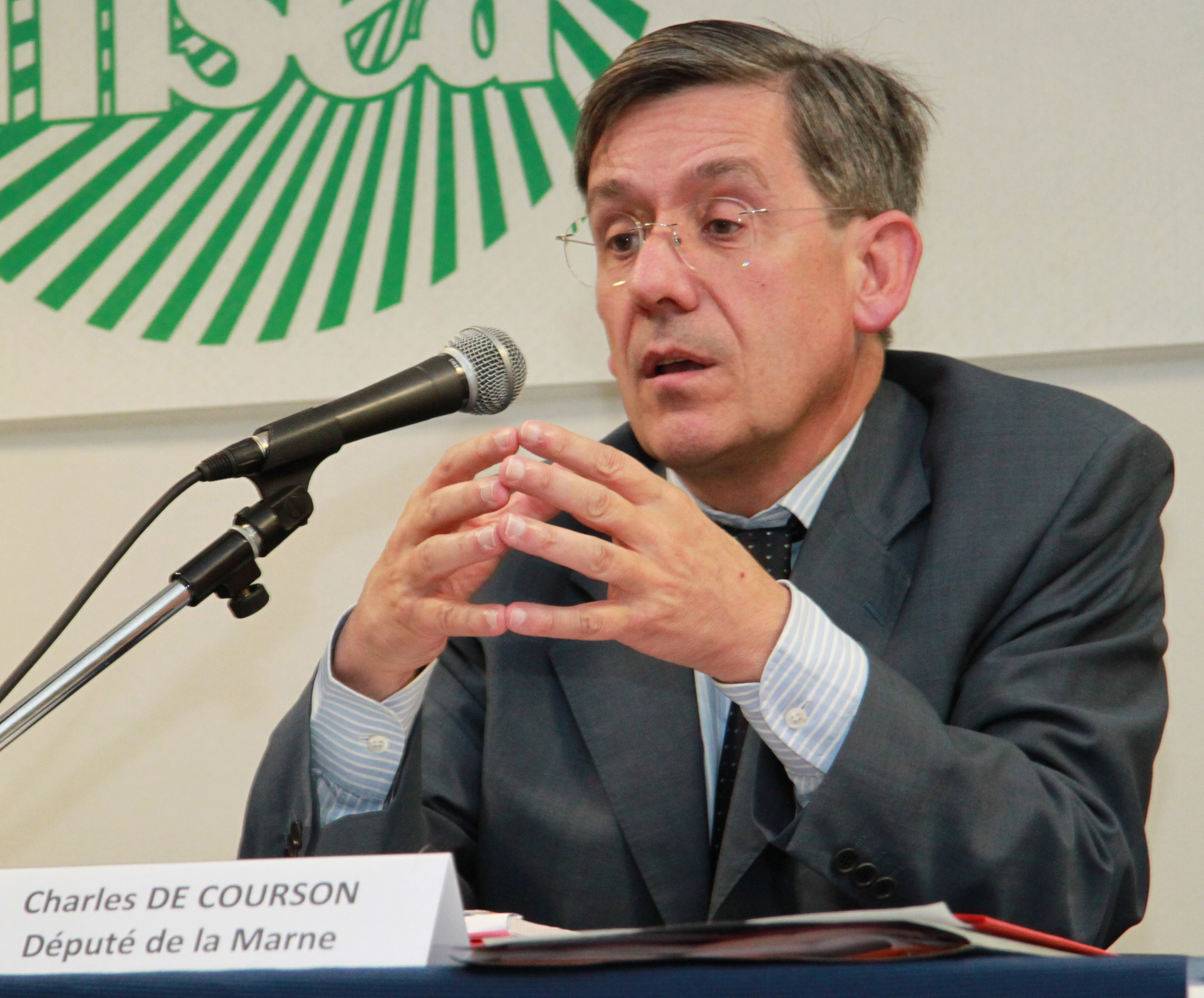
Charles de Courson in 2012

Following his reelection in 2022, he became the longest-serving deputy in the National Assembly. He sat successively with the (now former) Union for French Democracy (1993–2007), New Centre (2007–2012) and Union of Democrats and Independents (2012–2018) groups, prior to joining Liberties and Territories in 2018 (renamed Liberties, Independents, Overseas and Territories in 2022).

In 2023, he led a vote of no confidence against the government of Prime Minister Élisabeth Borne over proposals to raise the state pension age by executive decree.

In 2024, he ran in the first two rounds of voting for President of the National Assembly, before removing his name ahead of the final round; the position eventually went to incumbent Yaël Braun-Pivet.

== Political positions ==
De Courson opposed the 2013 legalisation of same-sex marriage in France, instead proposing a civil union pact. He has advocated a reduction in the number of civil servants and a stricter state budget.

Ahead of the 2016 The Republicans presidential primary, he supported Alain Juppé. Following François Fillon winning the primary, he joined his campaign team.

De Courson opposed the Socialist-led 2013 pension reform, instead co-signing an amendment providing for a gradual increase in the legal retirement age to 65. He supported the 2022 presidential candidacy of Valérie Pécresse, whose programme included a postponement of the retirement age to 65. However, in 2023, he opposed raising the legal retirement age to 64, calling the government's method a "total misuse of procedure".

He has denounced the "illusion of security at airports"; following the attempted bombing of Northwest Airlines Flight 253, he called full body scanners a new sort of "Maginot Line around our airports".

In 2017, he proposed increasing the monthly compensation for deputies from €5,600 to €9,000 "to ensure them a decent living". He later added: "I have been earning 3,500 euros net after tax for 30 years and working more than 100 hours a week."

== See also ==
- List of deputies of the 17th National Assembly of France
- Liberties, Independents, Overseas and Territories
