= Tony Bonalair =

French politician (born 2001)

President of Rassemblement national de la jeunesse
- Incumbent
- Assumed office 29 August 2026
- Preceded by: Pierre-Romain Thionnet

Personal details
- Born: 2001 (age 24–25)
- Party: National Rally (since 2022)
- Other political affiliations: Reconquête (2022)

Tony Bonalair (born 2001) is a French politician serving as president of Rassemblement national de la jeunesse since 2026. He has been a municipal councillor of Fontenay-Trésigny since 2026. From 2024 to 2026, he served as chairman of Rassemblement national de la jeunesse in Seine-et-Marne and as a legislative assistant to Julien Limongi. From January to May 2022, he was a member of Génération Z.
