= Marne's 5th constituency =

Constituency of the National Assembly of France

5th constituency of Marne
- inline Constituency of the National Assembly of France

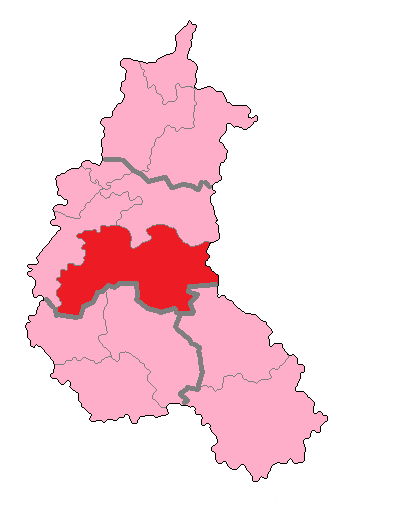
- The constituency shown within Champagne-Ardenne
- Incumbent deputy: Charles de Courson; LC
- Department: Marne
- Cantons: Anglure, Avize, Écury-sur-Coole, Fère-Champenoise, Heiltz-le-Maurupt, Saint-Remy-en-Bouzemont-Saint-Genest-et-Isson, Sompuis, Thiéblemont-Farémont, Vertus, Vitry-le-François-Est, Vitry-le-François-Ouest
- Registered voters: 76,921 (2017)

The 5th constituency of Marne (French: Cinquième circonscription de la Marne) is one of five electoral districts in the department of the same name, each of which returns one deputy to the French National Assembly in elections using the two-round system, with a run-off if no candidate receives more than 50% of the vote in the first round.

== Description ==
The constituency – which covers the south-central and south-eastern parts of the department and includes the town of Vitry-le-François – is made up of the eleven former cantons of Anglure, Avize, Écury-sur-Coole, Fère-Champenoise, Heiltz-le-Maurupt, Saint-Remy-en-Bouzemont-Saint-Genest-et-Isson, Sompuis, Thiéblemont-Farémont, Vertus, Vitry-le-François-Est, and Vitry-le-François-Ouest.

At the time of the 1999 census (which was the basis for the most recent redrawing of constituency boundaries, carried out in 2010) the 5th constituency had a total population of 83,412.

The constituency has returned the centre-right politician Charles de Courson, currently a member of the Les Centristes, at every election since 1993.

== Historic representation ==
Election	Member	Party
1986	Proportional representation – no election by constituency	
1988	Jean-Pierre Bouquet	PS
1993	Charles de Courson	UDF
1997	Charles de Courson	UDF
2002	Charles de Courson	UDF
2007	Charles de Courson	NC
2012	Charles de Courson	NC
2017	Charles de Courson	UDI
2022	Charles de Courson	LC

== Election results ==
=== 2024 ===
Legislative Election 2024: Marne's 5th constituency
Party	Candidate	Votes	%	±%
LC	Charles de Courson	21,751	42.66	−1.88
LO	Joëlle Bastien	502	0.98	N/A
PS (NFP)	Gaël Padiou	4,774	9.36	N/A
RN	Thierry Bosson	23,954	46.99	+19.75
Turnout		50,981	98.10	+49.08
Registered electors		75,602		
2nd round result
LC	Charles de Courson	26,393	50.43	+7.77
RN	Thierry Besson	25,947	49.57	+2.58
Turnout		52,340	98.34	+0.24
Registered electors		75,580		
LC hold		Swing		

=== 2022 ===
Legislative Election 2022: Marne's 5th constituency
Party	Candidate	Votes	%	±%
LC (UDC)	Charles de Courson	16,329	44.54	+1.61
RN	Pierre-Romain Thionnet	9,989	27.24	+5.74
LFI (NUPÉS)	Karine Le Luron	4,066	11.09	+0.74
MoDem (Ensemble)	Isabelle Pestre	3,268	8.91	−11.97
REC	Emmanuel Renoud	1,293	3.53	N/A
Others	N/A	1,720	-	−
Turnout		36,665	49.02	−2.16
2nd round result
LC (UDC)	Charles de Courson	21,325	63.03	-8.54
RN	Pierre-Romain Thionnet	12,506	36.97	+8.54
Turnout		33,831	46.35	+0.01
LC gain from UDI				

=== 2017 ===
Candidate	Label	First round		Second round	
Candidate	Label	Votes	%	Votes	%
Charles de Courson	UDI	16,631	42.93	24,074	71.57
Thomas Laval	FN	8,329	21.50	9,563	28.43
Bertrand Trepo	REM	8,089	20.88		
Laurène Massicard	FI	2,752	7.10		
Dominique Chailloux	PCF	1,261	3.25		
Estelle Arbogast	DLF	742	1.92		
Françoise Dehut	ECO	332	0.86		
Joëlle Bastien	EXG	279	0.72		
Julien Havasi	EXD	175	0.45		
Naceur Yagoubi	DIV	152	0.39		
Votes		38,742	100.00	33,637	100.00
Valid votes		38,742	98.40	33,637	94.37
Blank votes		446	1.13	1,471	4.13
Null votes		184	0.47	537	1.51
Turnout		39,372	51.18	35,645	46.34
Abstentions		37,556	48.82	41,276	53.66
Registered voters		76,928		76,921	
Source: Ministry of the Interior

=== 2012 ===
Legislative Election 2012: Marne's 5th constituency
Party	Candidate	Votes	%	±%
NM	Charles de Courson	22,051	47.69	
PS	Mariane Doremus	11,677	25.25	
FN	Pascal Erre	8,389	18.14	
FG	Nathalie Mayance	1,387	3.00	
Others	N/A	2,738		
Turnout		46,242	59.11	
2nd round result
NM	Charles de Courson	28,219	65.79	
PS	Mariane Doremus	14,673	34.21	
Turnout		42,892	54.83	
NM hold				

== Sources ==
- Official results of French elections from 2002: "Résultats électoraux officiels en France" (in French).
- Official results of French elections from 2017: "" (in French).
