= Elénor-François-Elie, Comte de Moustier =

French nobleman, army officer, and diplomat

Ancestral arms de Moustier

Elénor-François-Élie, marquis de Moustier (15 March 1751 – 1 February 1817) was a French nobleman, army officer, and diplomat.

== Education ==
After attending Heidelberg University and Besançon Artillery College, Élie de Moustier was commissioned in the French Army as a cavalry officer.

== Military service ==
Appointed a Lieutenant in the Royal Navarre Cavalry, he was seconded to the Garde du Corps in the rank of Captain, before being promoted Mestre de camp en second (Major) in the Dauphin's Regiment of Dragoons.

== Diplomatic career ==
He was French Minister to United States from 1787 to 1789, and Ambassador Extraordinary to London in 1793.

In 1769, he was posted to Lisbon with his brother-in-law, Marquis de Clermont d'Amboise as Attaché. In 1772, King Louis XV appointed him Minister-Counsellor to London. In 1776, he was appointed Secretary in the French Embassy at Naples, where his brother-in-law, Gaspard (marquis de Clermont d'Amboise), was also serving. In 1778, he was appointed Minister Plenipotentiary to the Elector of Trier until 1783, when he was posted as a Special Envoy to London following the peace treaty signed between Britain and France.

In 1787 he was appointed Minister Plenipotentiary to the United States. As minister he authored reports analyzing the U.S. Constitution and the prospects for its ratification. In 1790, he was recalled to a diplomatic post in Berlin and in September 1791, King Louis XVI offered him the post of Foreign Minister, which he declined. Although denying accusations of organizing a coalition of counter-revolutionaries in Prussia, it later emerged that the Count had been the instigator of this anti-Republican coalition. The King of France, then appointed him as French Ambassador to Constantinople.

The Revolutionary forces upon seizing power, called for the Comte (as he was then styled by courtesy) to be guillotined. However, the King's brother, the future Louis XVIII, gave de Moustier full authority to represent the interests of the French monarchy, and in 1792, he was granted the dignity of Regent, whilst the King remained in captivity. In 1793, he returned to England, where he conducted negotiations between British military commanders and Émigré troops. In 1795, he coordinated the landing of Royalists at Quiberon Bay. After the failure of the invasion, he fled to Prussia, then England before returning to France in 1814 upon the Bourbon Restoration, but was exiled again in 1815.

=== Washington correspondence ===
- Letter to the Count de Moustier, August 17, 1788
- Letter to Comte de Moustier, May 25, 1789
- Letter to Comte de Moustier, November 1, 1790

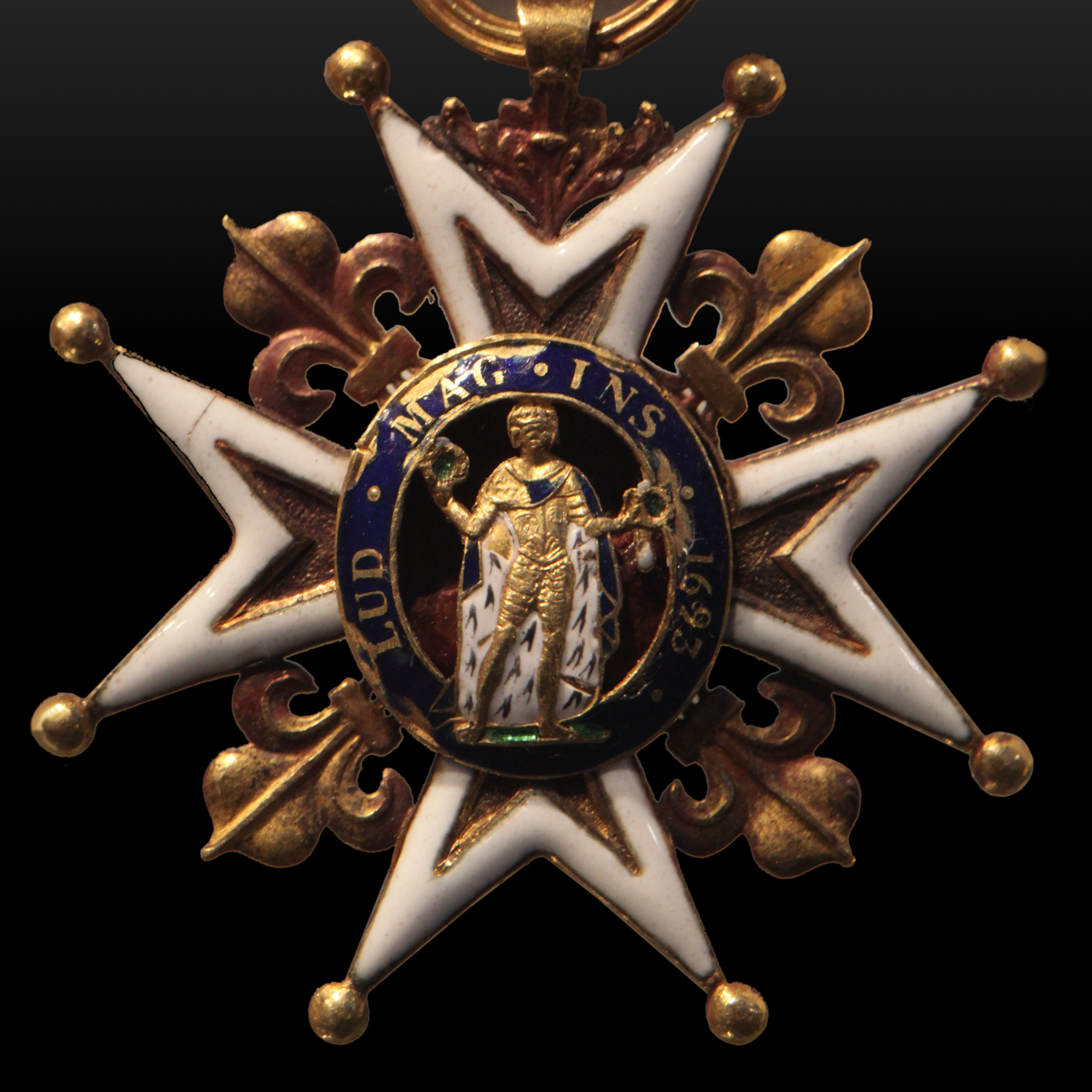
Grand-croix de Saint-Louis

== Honours ==
In 1784, he received the Grand Cross of Saint-Louis and, in 1789, he was appointed Knight of Saint George (Burgundy). De Moustier was also a Knight of Malta and Officier of the Légion d'honneur.

== Family ==
He was the third son of Philippe-Xavier, marquis de Moustier (died 1776) by his wife Louise de Bournel (died 1793), daughter of Jean-Charles, marquis de Namps.

He married Antoinette-Louise Millet, who died in 1783; on 2 January 1779, in Koblenz, they had a son, Edward-Clement (later 4th Marquis), who also went on to become a senior French diplomat. After the death of the marquise, Élie de Moustier became closely associated with her married sister, Anne-Flore Millet (marquise de Bréhan).

His appointment as French Ambassador to the United States by Louis XVI caused further uproar in France, leading to his recall in October 1789. It became apparent that he had used his time visiting President Washington at Mount Vernon to paint portraits of George Washington and Eleanor Parke Custis.

In 1801, he succeeded his elder brother Charles de Moustier in the marquessate.

== See also ==
- House of Amboise
- List of Ambassadors of France to Great Britain
- University of Heidelberg
