= Lionel de Moustier =

French diplomat and politician (1817–1869)

Lionel Désiré-Marie-René-François de Moustier
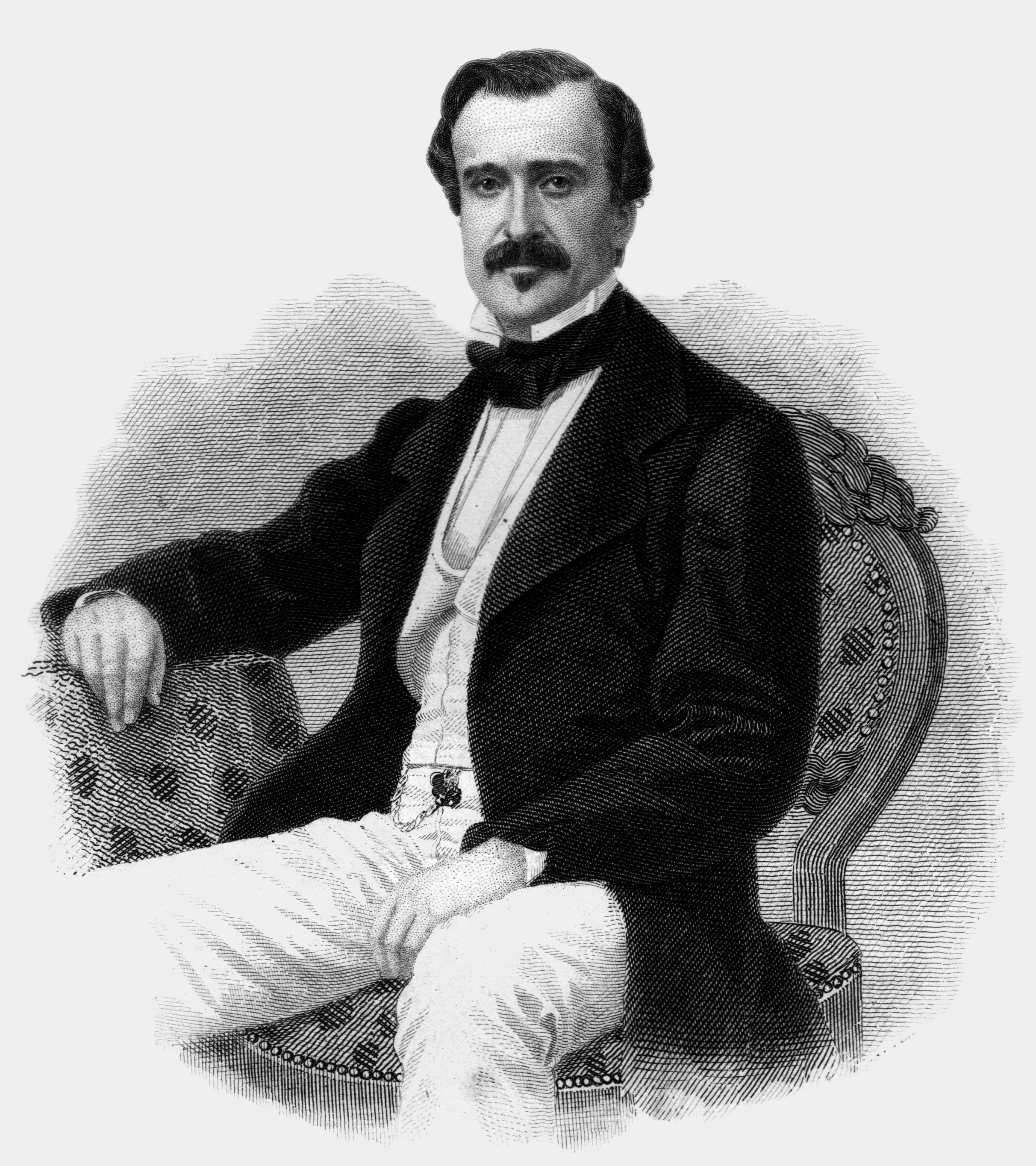
- Lionel de Moustier
- Born: 23 August 1817; Paris, France
- Died: 5 February 1869 (aged 51); Paris, France
- Occupations: Diplomat and politician
- Known for: Minister of Foreign Affairs

Lionel Désiré-Marie-René-François de Moustier (23 August 1817 – 5 February 1869) was a French diplomat and politician.

== Early years ==
Lionel Désiré-Marie-René-François, Marquis de Moustier was born in Paris on 23 August 1817, son of Clément-Édouard, Marquis de Moustier (1779–1830). His mother was Marie-Caroline de La Forest. His father was an ardent legitimist. Lionel inherited a large fortune. He married Fanny de Mérode, niece of Philippe-Félix-Balthasar-Othon Ghislain, Count of Mérode (1791–1857), whose daughter Marie-Anne married Charles Forbes René de Montalembert. Lionel de Moustiere and Fanny had two daughters, one of whom married the Marquis de Marmier.

Under King Louis-Philippe he was a member of the general council of the department of Doubs. In 1848 he was a candidate for election in Franche-Comté, his native land. He was elected to represent the department of Doubs on 13 May 1849 by conservative monarchists. He sat on the right, and continued to support the administration until the coup of 2 December 1851. He was appointed to the Advisory Committee, but soon resigned.

== Ambassador ==
On 10 March 1853 Lionel de Moustier was appointed minister plenipotentiary in Berlin, where he helped to ensure the neutrality of Prussia during the Crimean War. He had a scandalous affair in Berlin with the daughter of M. Delaunay, the minister of Sardinia in Prussia. Moustier was in Berlin during the Second Italian War of Independence in 1859, when France and the Kingdom of Sardinia were at war with Austria in Lombardy. Moustier was warned that Berlin would intervene if France failed to accept mediation. Moustier provided statistics that showed that Prussia was mobilizing a force that could readily defeat France's army on the Rhine. He remained in Berlin until November 1859, when he was appointed Ambassador of France at the court of Austria. On 28 August 1861 he was appointed Ambassador in Constantinople, a difficult position.

== Foreign minister ==
On 1 September 1866 de Moustier replaced Édouard Drouyn de Lhuys as Minister of Foreign Affairs. During an 1866 crisis in Romania, Moustier counselled the emperor to advise and support the Porte in Constantinople, but to avoid interfering in internal affairs in the Turkish empire, and to work together with England in this, since England had essentially the same policy. While in office he also had to handle the question of the annexation of Luxembourg with Prussia. In the Roman question he enforced the convention of 15 September and opposed the concessions proposed by General Luigi Federico Menabrea, Italian Prime Minister. He was willing to submit the issue to Congress, but did not succeed. Speaking in Senate he responded to Cardinal de Bonnechose and to Baron Charles Dupin that the government would support the rights of the Pope as well as Italian unification.

== Last years ==
In 1867 Lionel de Moustier was awarded the Grand Cross of the Legion of Honour. With failing health, he left office in December 1868, and on 17 December 1868 was appointed senator. He continued to support the imperial regime in the senate. He died on 5 February 1869. His son, Pierre René, was deputy for Doubs from 1889 to 1921, and senator from 1921 to 1935. His grandson Léonel de Moustier was also deputy for Doubs, elected in 1928. Léonel was active in the Resistance during World War II, was captured by the Germans and died in 1945.
