= Pierre-Romain Thionnet =

French politician (born 1994)

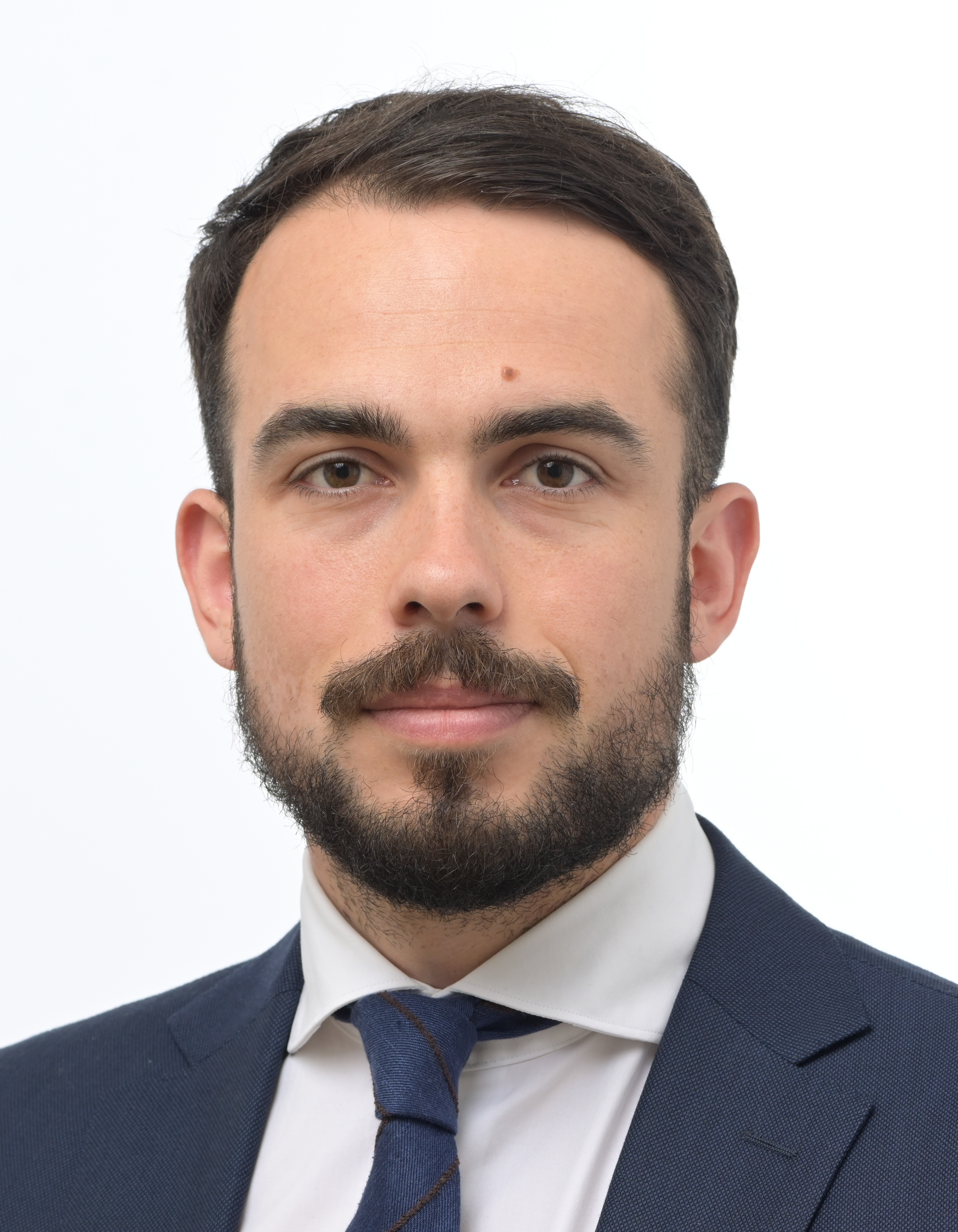

Member of the European Parliament
- Incumbent
- Assumed office 16 July 2024
- Constituency: France

Personal details
- Born: 19 January 1994 (age 32) Pontarlier, France
- Party: National Rally

Pierre-Romain Thionnet (French pronunciation: [pjɛʁ ʁɔmɛ̃ tjɔnɛ]; born 19 January 1994) is a French politician of the National Rally (RN) who was elected a Member of the European Parliament (MEP) in 2024.

== Career ==
Thionnet was a member of the Regional Council of Île-de-France. He was the chief of staff of Jordan Bardella. He was president of Rassemblement national de la jeunesse, the youth organization of the French National Rally. Thionnet was a candidate in Marne's 5th constituency in the 2022 French legislative election but was defeated in the second round by longstanding Member of Parliament Charles de Courson.

He became a Member of the European Parliament in the 2024 European Parliament election.

== See also ==
- List of members of the European Parliament (2024–2029)
