= Rassemblement national de la jeunesse =

Young wing of the French National Rally

National Youth Rally Rassemblement national de la jeunesse
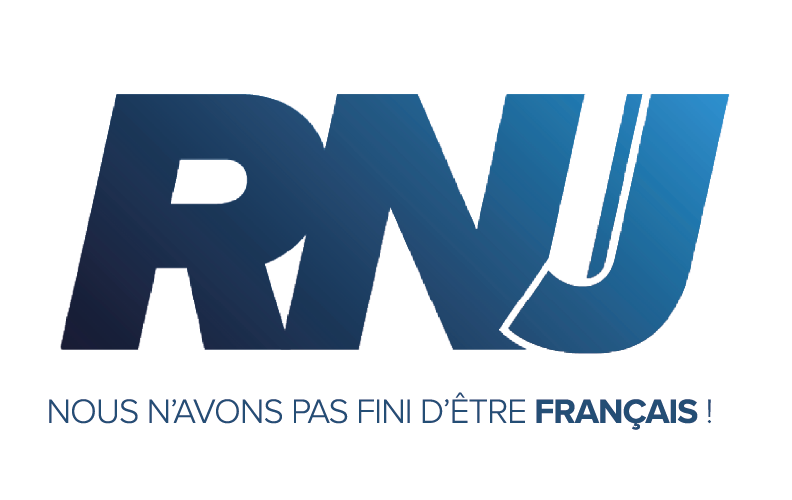
- President: Tony Bonalair
- Founded: 1973
- Headquarters: Nanterre, France
- Ideology: French nationalism National conservatism Souverainism; Protectionism; Right-wing populism Anti-immigration; Euroscepticism
- Mother party: National Rally
- European affiliation: Patriots.eu
- Website: generation-nation.fr

Rassemblement national de la jeunesse (RNJ), formerly the Front National de la Jeunesse (FNJ; English: National Youth Front; 1973–2018) and the Génération Nation (GN; English: Nation Generation; 2018–2022), is the youth wing of the French National Rally, founded in 1973. Since 2011, anyone between the ages of 16 and 30 has been able to become a member. The FNJ had 25,000 members in December 2013.

== Internal organization ==
=== Presidents ===
- 1973–1983: Christian Baeckeroot
- 1983–1986: Carl Lang
- 1986–1992: Martial Bild
- 1992–1999: Samuel Maréchal
- 1999–2000: Guillaume Luyt
- 2000–2001: Erwan Le Gouëllec
- 2001–2004: Louis-Armand de Béjarry
- 2005: Arnaud Frery
- 2005–2008: Alexandre Ayroulet
- 2008–2009: Loïc Lemarinier
- 2009–2011: David Rachline
- 2011–2012: Nathalie Pigeot
- 2012–2014: Julien Rochedy
- 2014–2018: Gaëtan Dussausaye
- March 2018–July 2021: Jordan Bardella
- July 2021–November 2022: Aleksandar Nikolic
- November 2022–August 2026: Pierre-Romain Thionnet
- August 2026–present: Tony Bonalair

== Notes and references ==
- https://www.bfmtv.com/politique/front-national/
