= Léonel de Moustier =

French politician (1882–1945)

Marquis Léonel de Moustier (5 April 1882, in Paris – 10 May 1945) was a French businessman and politician.

Léonel Marie Ghislain Alfred de Moustier, son of Marquis Pierre de Moustier, was born in Paris. His father represented Doubs in the Chamber of Deputies and in the Senate. His grandfather Lionel de Moustier was a diplomat under the Second Empire, and his great-grandfather was a member of the Chamber of Peers.

De Moustier served in the French Army during the First World War and received the Croix de guerre 1914-1918 and the Légion d'Honneur. He was mayor of Cubry as his father had been before him and in 1928 again followed his father, this time to represent Doubs in the Chamber of Deputies, sitting with the Republican Federation. While principally interested in economic and social affairs, he was later an opponent of any appeasement of Nazi Germany and called for increased military preparedness.

On the outbreak of the Second World War, he returned to service with the French Army, then aged 57. After the signing of the armistice with Germany in June 1940, he was one of the 80 who voted against the grant of special powers to Philippe Pétain and the creation of the Vichy régime. Moustier described the armistice as treason and Pétain as a traitor and was associated with the French Resistance. He was a district leader in the Organisation de résistance de l'armée, and provided assistance to the United Kingdom's Secret Intelligence Service.

He was arrested by the Gestapo on 23 August 1943 and imprisoned first at Besançon and then at Compiègne, and was deported to Neuengamme concentration camp in the summer of 1944. He died there shortly after the camp was liberated. He was posthumously made a member of the Ordre de la Libération.

His son Roland de Moustier (1909–2001) was also a politician.
