= Vanault-les-Dames =

- Commune
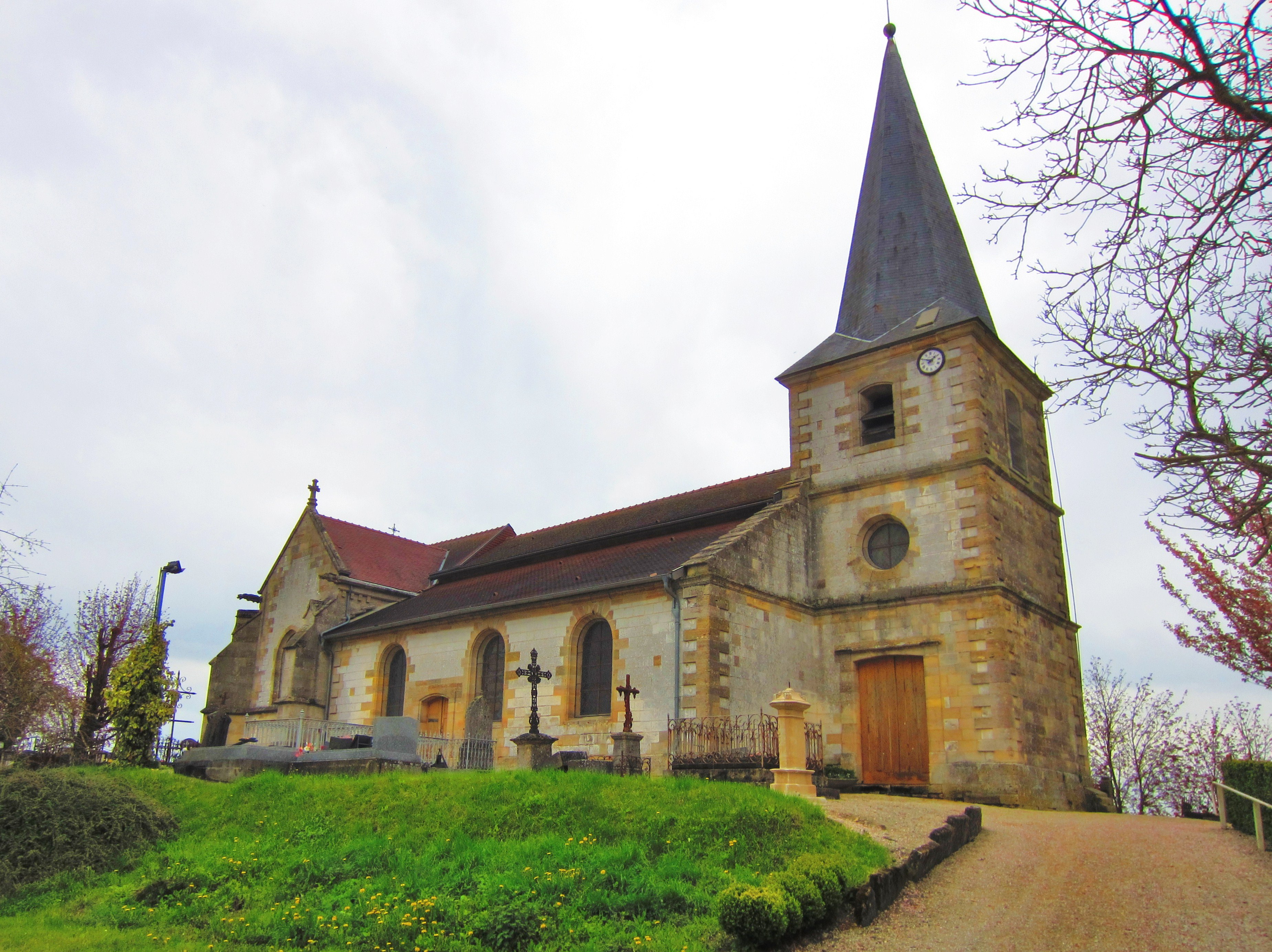
- The church in Vanault-les-Dames

- Coat of arms
- Location of Vanault-les-Dames
- Location within France Location within Grand Est
- Coordinates: 48°50′36″N 4°46′14″E
- Country: France
- Region: Grand Est
- Department: Marne
- Arrondissement: Vitry-le-François
- Canton: Sermaize-les-Bains
- Intercommunality: Côtes de Champagne et Val de Saulx

Government
  - Mayor (2020–2026): Caroline Issenhuth
- Area^{1}: 19.97 km^{2} (7.71 sq mi)
- Population (2023): 376
  - Density: 18.8/km^{2} (48.8/sq mi)
- Time zone: UTC+01:00 (CET)
  - Summer (DST): UTC+02:00 (CEST)
- INSEE/Postal code: 51590 /51340
- ^{1} French Land Register data, which excludes lakes, ponds, glaciers > 1 km^{2} (0.386 sq mi or 247 acres) and river estuaries.

Vanault-les-Dames (French pronunciation: [vano le dam]) is a commune in the Marne department in north-eastern France.

== See also ==
- Communes of the Marne department
