= Porterie =

Porterie is a surname. Notable people with the surname include:

- Donovan Porterie (born 1987), American football player
- Gaston Louis Noel Porterie (1885–1953), American judge
