= Bréhan =

Commune in Brittany, France

Bréhan Brehant-Loudieg
- Commune
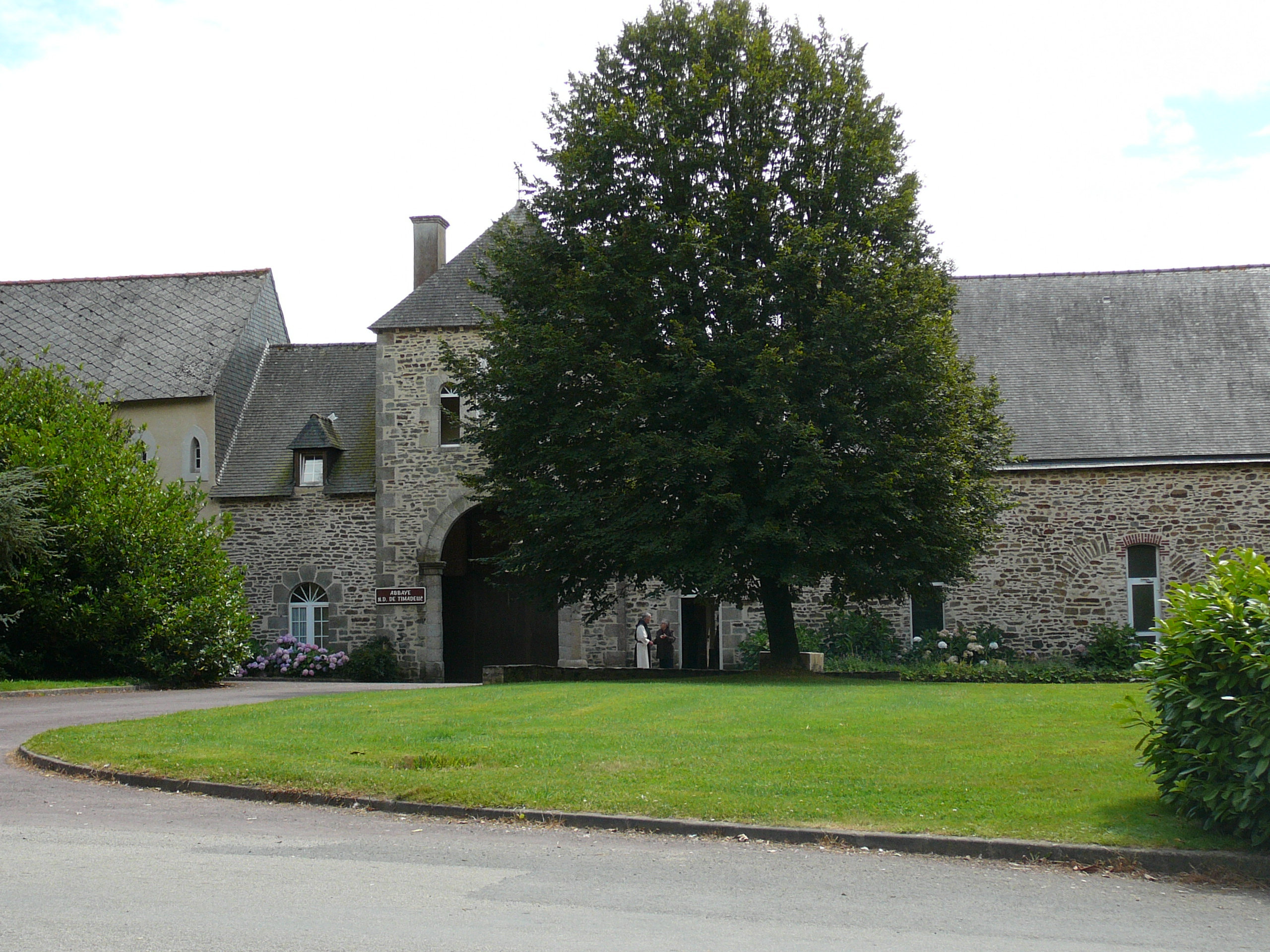
- The entrance to the Abbey of Our Lady, in Timadeuc

- Coat of arms
- Location of Bréhan
- Location within France Location within Brittany
- Coordinates: 48°03′42″N 2°41′10″W
- Country: France
- Region: Brittany
- Department: Morbihan
- Arrondissement: Pontivy
- Canton: Grand-Champ
- Intercommunality: Pontivy Communauté

Government
  - Mayor (2026–32): Jean Guillot
- Area^{1}: 51.65 km^{2} (19.94 sq mi)
- Highest elevation: 158 m (518 ft)
- Lowest elevation: 45 m (148 ft)
- Population (2023): 2,306
  - Density: 44.65/km^{2} (115.6/sq mi)
- Time zone: UTC+01:00 (CET)
  - Summer (DST): UTC+02:00 (CEST)
- INSEE/Postal code: 56024 /56580
- ^{1} French Land Register data, which excludes lakes, ponds, glaciers > 1 km^{2} (0.386 sq mi or 247 acres) and river estuaries.

Bréhan (French pronunciation: [bʁeɑ̃]; Breton: Brehant-Loudieg) is a commune in the Morbihan department of Brittany in northwestern France.

== Population ==
Historical population
Year	Pop.	±% p.a.
1968	1,885	—
1975	2,005	+0.89%
1982	2,257	+1.71%
1990	2,284	+0.15%
1999	2,314	+0.15%
2007	2,309	−0.03%
2012	2,332	+0.20%
2017	2,305	−0.23%
2023	2,306	+0.01%
Source: INSEE

Inhabitants of Bréhan are called Bréhannais in French.

== See also ==
- Communes of the Morbihan department
