= Results of the 2024 French legislative election in Moselle =

Following the first round of the 2024 French legislative election on 30 June 2024, runoff elections in each constituency where no candidate received a vote share greater than 50 percent were scheduled for 7 July. Candidates permitted to stand in the runoff elections needed to either come in first or second place in the first round or achieve more than 12.5 percent of the votes of the entire electorate (as opposed to 12.5 percent of the vote share due to low turnout).

== Moselle ==
=== 1st constituency ===
Candidate	Party or alliance		First round		Second round	
Candidate	Party or alliance		Votes	%	Votes	%
Grégoire Laloux	National Rally		22,570	39.81	25,070	44.30
Belkhir Belhaddad	Ensemble	Renaissance	15,640	27.59	31,517	55.70
Vincent Felix	New Popular Front	La France Insoumise	14,793	26.10		
Stephen Duso-Bauduin	Independent		1,094	1.93		
Jean-François Jacques	Sovereigntist right	Debout la France	1,027	1.81		
Didier Georget	Far-left	Lutte Ouvrière	745	1.31		
Américo Jonas Costa	Independent		618	1.09		
Célia Lejal	Far-left	New Anticapitalist Party (Note: Dissident who ran without the support of the New Popular Front)	202	0.36		
Total			56,689	100.00	56,587	100.00
Valid votes			56,689	96.83	56,587	95.32
Invalid votes			490	0.84	625	1.05
Blank votes			1,367	2.33	2,155	3.63
Total votes			58,546	100.00	59,367	100.00
Registered voters/turnout			93,930	62.33	93,956	63.19

=== 2nd constituency ===
Candidate	Party or alliance		First round		Second round	
Candidate	Party or alliance		Votes	%	Votes	%
Marie-Claude Voinçon	National Rally		18,352	37.48	20,480	42.35
Ludovic Mendes	Ensemble	Renaissance	14,795	30.22	27,875	57.65
Victorien Nicolas	New Popular Front	Socialist Party	13,028	26.61		
Laurent Parisse	Independent		1,477	3.02		
Aurélie Contal	Regionalists	Ecologists	741	1.51		
Mario Rinaldi	Far-left	Lutte Ouvrière	461	0.94		
Gisèle Taty Bouanga	Independent		109	0.22		
Total			48,963	100.00	48,355	100.00
Valid votes			48,963	97.07	48,355	95.02
Invalid votes			456	0.90	547	1.07
Blank votes			1,022	2.03	1,985	3.90
Total votes			50,441	100.00	50,887	100.00
Registered voters/turnout			76,778	65.70	76,821	66.24

=== 3rd constituency ===
Candidate	Party or alliance		First round		Second round	
Candidate	Party or alliance		Votes	%	Votes	%
Victor Chomard	National Rally		16,948	35.32	18,347	38.22
Nathalie Colin-Oesterlé	Union of Democrats and Independents	The Centrists	16,631	34.66	29,657	61.78
Charlotte Leduc	New Popular Front	La France Insoumise	13,565	28.27		
Etienne Hodara	Far-left	Lutte Ouvrière	699	1.46		
Gaël Diaferia	Far-left	New Anticapitalist Party (Note: Dissident who ran without the backing of the New Popular Front)	143	0.30		
Total			47,986	100.00	48,004	100.00
Valid votes			47,986	97.25	48,004	96.38
Invalid votes			366	0.74	452	0.91
Blank votes			991	2.01	1,351	2.71
Total votes			49,343	100.00	49,807	100.00
Registered voters/turnout			76,057	64.88	76,064	65.48

=== 4th constituency ===
Candidate	Party or alliance		First round		Second round	
Candidate	Party or alliance		Votes	%	Votes	%
Océane Simon	National Rally		22,265	42.66	24,127	45.17
Fabien Di Filippo	The Republicans		18,659	35.75	29,287	54.83
Hélène Girardot	New Popular Front	Communist Party	6,156	11.80		
Emilie Crenner	Ensemble	Democratic Movement	4,191	8.03		
Jean-Philippe Bott	Reconquête		464	0.89		
Marc Baud-Bertier	Far-left	Lutte Ouvrière	438	0.84		
Léna Decker	Regionalists	Independent	17	0.03		
Total			52,190	100.00	53,414	100.00
Valid votes			52,190	97.93	53,414	97.29
Invalid votes			400	0.75	369	0.67
Blank votes			703	1.32	1,118	2.04
Total votes			53,293	100.00	54,901	100.00
Registered voters/turnout			80,777	65.98	80,786	67.96

=== 5th constituency ===
Candidate	Party or alliance		First round		Second round	
Candidate	Party or alliance		Votes	%	Votes	%
Pascal Jenft	National Rally		20,884	47.52	23,584	52.64
Vincent Seitlinger	The Republicans		15,045	34.23	21,219	47.36
Lisa Lahore	New Popular Front	La France Insoumise	5,439	12.38		
Denis Lieb	Regionalists	Independent	1,128	2.57		
Hervé Hocquet	Sovereigntist right	Debout la France	552	1.26		
Gilles Sebastian	Far-left	Lutte Ouvrière	453	1.03		
Stéphane Marchand	Reconquête		449	1.02		
Total			43,950	100.00	44,803	100.00
Valid votes			43,950	97.41	44,803	96.68
Invalid votes			405	0.90	385	0.83
Blank votes			763	1.69	1,154	2.49
Total votes			45,118	100.00	46,342	100.00
Registered voters/turnout			72,095	62.58	72,102	64.27

=== 6th constituency ===
Candidate	Party or alliance		Votes	%
Kévin Pfeffer	National Rally		18,575	50.90
Alexandre Cassaro	The Republicans		7,746	21.23
Claire Bladt	New Popular Front	La France Insoumise	7,740	21.21
Dominique Feiss	Miscellaneous right	Independent	1,348	3.69
Lola Legrand	Far-left	Lutte Ouvrière	618	1.69
Olivier Munch	Miscellaneous left	Independent	466	1.28
Total			36,493	100.00
Valid votes			36,493	97.56
Invalid votes			246	0.66
Blank votes			666	1.78
Total votes			37,405	100.00
Registered voters/turnout			66,393	56.34

=== 7th constituency ===
Candidate	Party or alliance		Votes	%
Alexandre Loubet	National Rally		28,528	53.33
Luc Muller	New Popular Front	The Ecologists	9,913	18.53
Yasmine Selmani	Ensemble	Radical Party	9,644	18.03
André Wojciechowski	Miscellaneous right	The Republicans	4,403	8.23
Diane Bousset	Far-left	Lutte Ouvrière	931	1.74
Younès Boucetta	Independent		79	0.15
Total			53,498	100.00
Valid votes			53,498	97.00
Invalid votes			412	0.75
Blank votes			1,242	2.25
Total votes			55,152	100.00
Registered voters/turnout			89,245	61.80

=== 8th constituency ===
Candidate	Party or alliance		First round		Second round	
Candidate	Party or alliance		Votes	%	Votes	%
Laurent Jacobelli	National Rally		23,558	46.36	26,435	54.41
Céline Leger	New Popular Front	La France Insoumise	14,724	28.98	22,147	45.59
Samuel Zonato	Ensemble	Radical Party	7,986	15.72		
Raphaëlle Rosa	The Republicans		3,296	6.49		
Annick Jolivet	Far-left	Lutte Ouvrière	1,249	2.46		
Total			50,813	100.00	48,582	100.00
Valid votes			50,813	97.11	48,582	91.67
Invalid votes			401	0.77	897	1.69
Blank votes			1,112	2.13	3,516	6.63
Total votes			52,326	100.00	52,995	100.00
Registered voters/turnout			91,374	57.27	91,382	57.99

=== 9th constituency ===
Candidate	Party or alliance		First round		Second round	
Candidate	Party or alliance		Votes	%	Votes	%
Baptiste Philippo	National Rally		24,483	38.29	26,700	41.87
Isabelle Rauch	Ensemble	Horizons	22,460	35.12	37,070	58.13
Brigitte Vaïsse	New Popular Front	Socialist Party	14,607	22.84		
Florent Hammerschmitt	Reconquête		1,181	1.85		
Guy Maurhofer	Far-left	Lutte Ouvrière	805	1.26		
Laurent Kopp	Independent		413	0.65		
Total			63,949	100.00	63,770	100.00
Valid votes			63,949	97.31	63,770	96.08
Invalid votes			460	0.70	602	0.91
Blank votes			1,308	1.99	2,003	3.02
Total votes			65,717	100.00	66,375	100.00
Registered voters/turnout			100,711	65.25	100,740	65.89
