= Aloyse Warhouver =

French politician (1930–2024)

Deputy of the French National Assembly for Moselle's 4th constituency
- In office 23 June 1988 – 18 June 2002
- Preceded by: Pierre Messmer (1986) proportional representation (1988)
- Succeeded by: Alain Marty

Mayor of Xouaxange
- In office 6 March 1983 – 11 March 2001

Member of the General Council of Moselle for the Canton of Sarrebourg
- In office 30 September 1973 – 22 March 1998
- Preceded by: André Vataux
- Succeeded by: Alain Marty

Personal details
- Born: 26 February 1930 Hoff, France
- Died: 16 June 2024 (aged 94) Walscheid, France
- Party: DVG; PRG
- Occupation: Schoolteacher

Aloyse Warhouver (26 February 1930 – 16 June 2024) was a French politician of the Miscellaneous left (DVG) and the Radical Party of the Left (PRG). He was a member of the General Council of Moselle for the Canton of Sarrebourg from 1973 to 1998 and mayor of Xouaxange from 1983 to 2001. He also served in the National Assembly from 1988 to 2002, representing Moselle's 4th constituency. Warhouver died in Walscheid on 16 June 2024, at the age of 94.
