= Departmental Council of Moselle =

Departmental legislature in France

Departmental Council of Moselle Conseil départemental de la Moselle
- Logo of the Council

Leadership
- President: Patrick Weiten, UDI since 2 April 2015

The Departmental Council of Moselle (French: Conseil départemental de la Moselle) is the deliberative assembly of the French department of Moselle. Its headquarters are in Metz at the end of Île du Petit Saulcy. The council includes 54 departmental councilors elected from the 27 cantons of Moselle.

== Executive ==
=== President ===
On 1 July 2021, Patrick Weiten was re-elected president of the departmental council, winning against Jean François.

=== Vice-presidents ===
In addition to the president, the executive has 15 vice-presidents.

Vice-presidents of the Departmental Council of Moselle (since 2021)
Order	Name	Canton (constituency)	Delegation
1st	Julien Freyburger	Le Sillon Mosellan	Finance, attractiveness, economy and energy transition
2nd	Sonya Cristinelli-Fraibœuf	Sarralbe	Autonomy and disability
3rd	David Suck	Bitche	Regional planning, agriculture, contractual policies and environment
4th	Marie-Louise Kuntz	Montigny-lès-Metz	Protection of children and families
5th	Armel Chabane	Bouzonville	Sports
6th	Élisabeth Haag	Stiring-Wendel	Housing policy, religious harmony and gens du voyage scheme
7th	Gilbert Schuh	Forbach	International and cross-border relations and multilingualism
8th	Brigitte Schneider	Thionville	Integration, employment and training
9th	Khalifé Khalifé	Metz-2	Higher education, research, innovation and health
10th	Ginette Magras	Boulay-Moselle	Citizen relations, security and relations with military authorities
11th	Bernard Simon	Sarrebourg	Tourism
12th	Rachel Zirovnik	Yutz	Youth
13th	Rémy Dick	Pameck	Culture
14th	Anne Stémart	Metz-3	Education and colleges
15th	Jean-Luc Saccani	Faulquemont	Mobility and infrastructure
