= Cultural and Education Affairs Committee =

French National Assembly Standing Committee

Committee for Cultural Affairs and Education
- 16th legislature
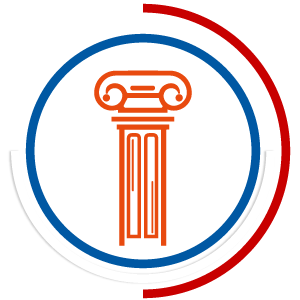

Leadership
- Chair: Isabelle Rauch, Horizons since 6 July 2022
- Seats: 71

The Cultural and Education Affairs Committee (French: Commission des Affaires culturelles et de l'Éducation) is one of the eight standing committees of the French National Assembly, created on July 1, 2009, by the split of the former Committee for Cultural, Family and Social Affairs .

== Jurisdiction ==
The powers of the Commission for Cultural Affairs and Education are as follows:

- School education
- Higher Education
- Research
- Youth
- Sports
- Artistic and cultural activities
- Communication
- Intellectual property

== List of chairmen ==
Portrait	Name	Constituency	Took office	Left office	Political party	Legislature
	Michèle Tabarot	Alpes-Maritimes's 9th constituency	July 1, 2009	June 28, 2012	UMP	13th legislature
	Patrick Bloche	Paris's 7th constituency	June 28, 2012	June 20, 2017	PS	14th legislature
	Bruno Studer	Bas-Rhin's 3rd constituency	June 29, 2017	June 21, 2022	LREM	15th legislature
	Agnès Firmin-Le Bodo	Seine-Maritime's 7th constituency	June 30, 2022	July 6, 2022	Horizons	16th legislature
	Isabelle Rauch	Moselle's 9th constituency	July 6, 2022	2024	Horizons	16th legislature

== Current Bureau's Committee ==
Composition of the bureau
Post	Name	Constituency	Group
Chairman	Isabelle Rauch	Moselle's 9th constituency	HOR
Vice-chair	Maxime Minot	Oise's 7th constituency	LR
Vice-chair	Sarah Legrain	Paris's 16th constituency	LFI
Vice-chair	Géraldine Bannier	Mayenne's 2nd constituency	DEM
Vice-chair	Fabienne Colboc	Indre-et-Loire's 4th constituency	RE
Secretary	Béatrice Descamps	Nord's 21st constituency	LIOT
Secretary	Frédérique Meunier	Corrèze's 2nd constituency	LR
Secretary	Emmanuel Pellerin	Hauts-de-Seine's 9th constituency	RE
