= Patrick Weiten =

French politician (born 1954)

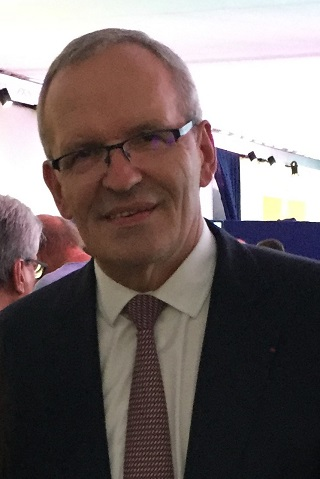
- Weiten in 2017

President of the Departmental Council of Moselle
- Incumbent
- Assumed office 31 March 2011
- Preceded by: Philippe Leroy

Member of the National Assembly
- In office 16 April 2016 – 20 June 2017
- Preceded by: Anne Grommerch
- Succeeded by: Isabelle Rauch

Personal details
- Born: 1 July 1954 (age 71) Yutz, France
- Party: PRV; MR (2017–2019); UDI (2012–present)
- Profession: Engineer

Patrick Weiten (born 1 July 1954) is a French politician and engineer who has been the president of the Departmental Council of Moselle since 2011. A member of the Union of Democrats and Independents party, Weiten also served as a Member of the National Assembly for Moselle's 9th constituency from 2016 to 2017.

== Early life and education ==
Weiten was born on 1 July 1954 in Yutz, within the Moselle department, France.

== Political career ==
Weiten first entered politics in 1995 when he was elected mayor of Yutz, a position he held until 2011.

On 16 April 2016, Weiten became the deputy for Moselle's 9th constituency, after the death of Anne Grommerch the day prior.
