= Paola Zanetti =

French politician (born 1976)

Member of the French National Assembly for Moselle's 7th constituency
- In office 20 June 2012 – 20 June 2017
- Preceded by: André Wojciechowski
- Succeeded by: Hélène Zannier

Personal details
- Born: 1 September 1976 (age 49)
- Party: Socialist Party
- Relatives: Jean-Pierre Masseret (step-father)

Paola Zanetti (born 1 September 1976) is a French politician. From 2012 to 2017, she was a member of the National Assembly. She is the step-daughter of Jean-Pierre Masseret.
