= Moselle's 9th constituency =

Constituency of the National Assembly of France

9th constituency of Moselle
- inline Constituency of the National Assembly of France

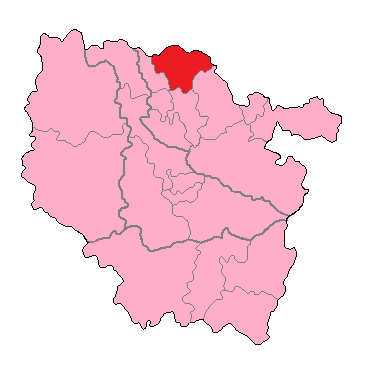
- Moselle's 9th Constituency shown within Lorraine
- Deputy: Isabelle Rauch; Horizons
- Department: Moselle
- Cantons: Cattenom, Metzervisse, Sierck-les-Bains, Thionville-Est, Thionville-Ouest, Yutz
- Registered voters: 97,022

The 9th constituency of Moselle is a French legislative constituency in the Moselle département.

== Description ==
Moselle's 9th constituency consists of the city of Thionville close to the border with Luxembourg and the surrounding more rural areas.

The seat was held by Gaullist parties from 1988 until 2017. Following the suicide of Jean-Marie Demange in 2008, Anne Grommerch acquired it.

== Historic Representation ==
Election	Member	Party
1986	Proportional representation - no election by constituency	
1988	Jean-Marie Demange	RPR
1993	Jean-Marie Demange	RPR
1997	Jean-Marie Demange	RPR
2002	Jean-Marie Demange	UMP
2007	Jean-Marie Demange	UMP
2008	Anne Grommerch	UMP
2012	Anne Grommerch	UMP
2016	Patrick Weiten	LR
2017	Isabelle Rauch	LREM
2022	Isabelle Rauch	HOR

== Election results ==
=== 2024 ===
Legislative Election 2024: Moselle's 9th constituency
Party	Candidate	Votes	%	±%
RN	Baptiste Philippo	24,483	38.29	+16.63
REC	Florent Hammerschmitt	1,181	1.85	−1.39
DIV	Laurent Kopp	413	0.65	N/A
HOR (Ensemble)	Isabelle Rauch	22,460	35.12	+2.56
PS (NFP)	Brigitte Vaïsse	14,607	22.84	+0.68
LO	Guy Maurhofer	805	1.26	N/aA
Turnout		63,949	97.31	+55.85
Registered electors		100,711		
2nd round result
HOR	Isabelle Rauch	37,070	58.13	+23.01
RN	Baptiste Philippo	26,700	41.87	+3.58
Turnout		63,770	96.08	−1.23
Registered electors		100,740		
HOR hold		Swing		

=== 2022 ===
Legislative Election 2022: Moselle's 9th constituency
Party	Candidate	Votes	%	±%
HOR (Ensemble)	Isabelle Rauch	13,406	32.56	-3.62
PS (NUPÉS)	Brigitte Vaïsse	9,126	22.16	+1.80
RN	Stéphane Reichling	8,918	21.66	+8.34
LR (UDC)	Lucas Grandjean	2,798	6.80	−6.35
DVD	Lionel Bieder	1,578	3.83	N/A
FGR	Yan Rutili	1,435	3.49	N/A
REC	Aurélie Wallian	1,336	3.24	N/A
Others	N/A	2,577	-	−
Turnout		41,174	41.46	−2.24
2nd round result
HOR (Ensemble)	Isabelle Rauch	20,048	55.03	-15.10
PS (NUPÉS)	Brigitte Vaïsse	16,386	44.97	N/A
Turnout		36,434	38.91	+0.93
HOR gain from LREM				

=== 2017 ===
Candidate	Label	First round		Second round	
Candidate	Label	Votes	%	Votes	%
Isabelle Rauch	REM	15,458	36.18	23,995	70.13
Émilie Matz	FN	5,690	13.32	10,218	29.87
Patrick Luxembourger	DVD	5,647	13.22		
Pauline Lapointe-Zordan	LR	5,618	13.15		
Jean-Luc Pierré	FI	4,157	9.73		
Brigitte Vaïsse	PS	2,885	6.75		
Guy Harau	ECO	1,243	2.91		
Carole Lelièvre-Christiany	DLF	699	1.64		
Anne Richard	PCF	416	0.97		
Guy Maurhofer	EXG	268	0.63		
Kévin Giges	REG	245	0.57		
Angela Maio	DIV	222	0.52		
François Gauche	DIV	174	0.41		
Yan Sander	DIV	0	0.00		
Votes		42,722	100.00	34,213	100.00
Valid votes		42,722	98.27	34,213	90.56
Blank votes		575	1.32	2,742	7.26
Null votes		178	0.41	825	2.18
Turnout		43,475	43.70	37,780	37.98
Abstentions		56,004	56.30	61,690	62.02
Registered voters		99,479		99,470	
Source: Ministry of the Interior

=== 2012 ===
Legislative Election 2012: Moselle's 9th constituency
Party	Candidate	Votes	%	±%
UMP	Anne Grommerch	20,130	40.04	
PS	Bertrand Mertz	19,422	38.63	
FN	Elisabeth Barget	6,779	13.48	
FG	Annie Hackenheimer	1,360	2.71	
EELV	Eliane Romani	1,289	2.56	
Others	N/A	1,292		
Turnout		50,272	51.81	
2nd round result
UMP	Anne Grommerch	26,519	53.07	
PS	Bertrand Mertz	23,449	46.93	
Turnout		49,968	51.50	
UMP hold				

== Sources ==
Official results of French elections from 2002: "Résultats électoraux officiels en France" (in French).
