= Loubet =

Loubet may refer to:

- a former village, now part of Villeneuve-Loubet, Alpes-Maritimes, France
- Alexandre Loubet (born 1994), French politician
- Émile Loubet, politician, 8th president of France
- Loubet Coast, a coast in Antarctica
- a Brazilian singer
