= Moselle's 7th constituency =

Constituency of the National Assembly of France

7th constituency of Moselle
- inline Constituency of the National Assembly of France

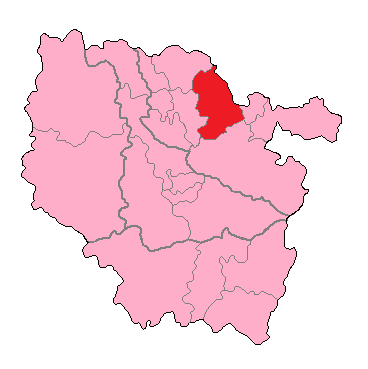
- Moselle's 7th Constituency shown within Lorraine
- Deputy: Alexandre Loubet; RN
- Department: Moselle
- Cantons: Boulay-Moselle, Bouzonville, Faulquemont, Saint-Avold-I, Saint-Avold-II
- Registered voters: 91,559

The 7th constituency of Moselle is a French legislative constituency in the Moselle département.

== Description ==
Moselle's 7th constituency is formed around the town of Saint-Avold on the German border.

The domination of conservative candidates was broken in the 2012 elections after a National Front candidate secured a place in the second round thus splitting the conservative vote and allowing the election of the Socialist candidate.

== Historic Representation ==
Election	Member	Party
1986	Proportional representation – no election by constituency	
1988	André Berthol	RPR
1993	André Berthol	RPR
1997	André Berthol	RPR
2002	André Berthol	UMP
2007	André Wojciechowski	UMP
2012	Paola Zanetti	PS
2017	Hélène Zannier	LREM
2022	Alexandre Loubet	RN

== Election results ==
=== 2024 ===
Legislative Election 2024: Moselle's 7th constituency
Party	Candidate	Votes	%	±%
RN	Alexandre Loubet	28,528	53.33	+19.53
PRG (Ensemble)	Yasmine Selmani	9,644	18.03	N/A
LR	André Wojciechowski	4,403	8.23	−7.72
LÉ–EELV (NFP)	Luc Muller	9,913	18.53	−1.19
LO	Diane Bousset	931	1.74	+0.53
DIV	Younès Boucetta	79	0.15	N/A
Turnout		53,498	97.00	+41.59
Registered electors		89,245		
RN hold		Swing		

=== 2022 ===
Legislative Election 2022: Moselle's 7th constituency
Party	Candidate	Votes	%	±%
RN	Alexandre Loubet	12,018	33.80	+10.05
LREM (Ensemble)	Hélène Zannier	7,851	22.08	-5.33
EELV (NUPÉS)	Luc Muller	7,013	19.72	−3.67
LR (UDC)	Anne Boucher	5,671	15.95	+1.42
REC	Clément Galante	1,818	5.11	N/A
DLF (UPF)	Hervé Hocquet	758	2.13	N/A
LO	Diane Bousset	429	1.21	+0.22
Turnout		35,558	40.56	+2.11
2nd round result
RN	Alexandre Loubet	18,424	55.41	+11.65
LREM (Ensemble)	Hélène Zannier	14,829	44.59	−11.65
Turnout		33,253	39.53	−1.35
RN gain from LREM				

=== 2017 ===
Candidate	Label	First round		Second round	
Candidate	Label	Votes	%	Votes	%
Hélène Zannier	REM	10,290	27.41	17,879	56.24
Kévin Pfeffer	FN	8,916	23.75	13,911	43.76
André Wojciechowski	UDI	6,520	17.37		
Paola Zanetti	PS	4,499	11.98		
Kathia Donaté	FI	3,443	9.17		
Alain Léger	REG	887	2.36		
Martine Jung	ECO	842	2.24		
Ridouan Faresse	DIV	553	1.47		
Diane Bousset	EXG	371	0.99		
Camille Waechter	ECO	362	0.96		
Jean-Marc Kiehl	DIV	308	0.82		
Emin Gunduz	DIV	275	0.73		
Isabelle Desselier	DIV	275	0.73		
Votes		37,541	100.00	31,790	100.00
Valid votes		37,541	97.36	31,790	92.15
Blank votes		772	2.00	2,189	6.35
Null votes		244	0.63	519	1.50
Turnout		38,557	42.67	34,498	38.18
Abstentions		51,813	57.33	55,862	61.82
Registered voters		90,370		90,360	
Source: Ministry of the Interior

=== 2012 ===
Legislative Election 2012:
Party	Candidate	Votes	%	±%
PRV	André Wojciechowski	15,310	32.45	
PS	Paola Zanetti	15,054	31.91	
FN	Nathalie Pigeot	12,304	26.08	
DVG	Fabrice Boucher	2,596	5.50	
Others	N/A	1,911		
Turnout		47,175	51.52	
2nd round result
PS	Paola Zanetti	18,840	38.49	
PRV	André Wojciechowski	18,471	37.74	
FN	Nathalie Pigeot	11,631	23.76	
Turnout		48,942	53.45	
PS gain from UMP				

== Sources ==
Official results of French elections from 2002: "Résultats électoraux officiels en France" (in French).
