= Hélène Zannier =

French politician

Deputy of the National Assembly for Moselle's 7th constituency
- In office 21 June 2017 – 21 June 2022
- Preceded by: Paola Zanetti
- Succeeded by: Alexandre Loubet

Personal details
- Born: 19 September 1972 (age 54) Saint-Avold, France
- Party: Renaissance
- Education: Institut d'études politiques de Lyon

Hélène Zannier (born 19 September 1972) is a French politician representing La République En Marche! She was elected to the French National Assembly on 18 June 2017, representing the Moselle's 7th constituency.

== See also ==
- 2017 French legislative election
