= Moselle's 4th constituency =

Constituency of the National Assembly of France

4th constituency of Moselle
- inline Constituency of the National Assembly of France

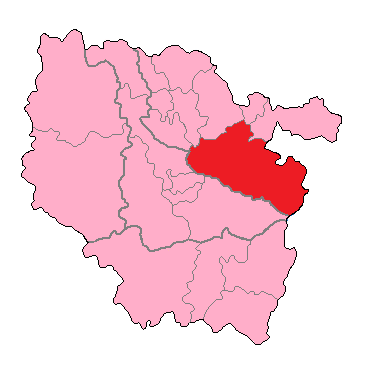
- Moselle's 4th Constituency shown within Lorraine
- Deputy: Fabien Di Filippo; LR
- Department: Moselle
- Cantons: Albestroff, Château-Salins, Delme, Dieuze, Fénétrange, Grostenquin, Lorquin, Phalsbourg, Réchicourt-le-Château, Sarrebourg, Vic-sur-Seille
- Registered voters: 81,175

The 4th constituency of Moselle is a French legislative constituency in the Moselle département.

== Description ==
Moselle's 4th constituency covers the areas in the south east of the department, it is the largest in terms of area in Moselle. It is bordered to the south by Meurthe-et-Moselle and to the east by Haut-Rhin.

The constituency has normally been held by conservative parties throughout the Fifth Republic with the exception of the fourteen years between 1988 and 2002 when it has held by Aloyse Warhouver.

The constituency is also notable for being the home seat of former Prime Minister Pierre Messmer.

== Historic Representation ==
Election	Member	Party
1958	Georges Thomas	MRP
1962	Henri Karcher	UNR
1967	Georges Thomas	MRP
1968	Pierre Messmer	UDR
1973	Pierre Messmer	UDR
1978	Pierre Messmer	RPR
1986	Proportional representation – no election by constituency	
1988	Aloyse Warhouver	DVG
1993	Aloyse Warhouver	DVG
1997	Aloyse Warhouver	DVG
2002	Alain Marty	UMP
2007	Alain Marty	UMP
2012	Alain Marty	UMP
2017	Fabien Di Filippo	LR
2022	Fabien Di Filippo	LR

== Election results ==
=== 2024 ===
->

Legislative Election 2024: Moselle's 4th constituency
Party	Candidate	Votes	%	±%
PCF (NFP)	Hélène Girardot	6,156	11.80	−1.47
MoDem (Ensemble)	Emilie Crenner	4,191	8.03	−5.41
REC	Jean-Philippe Bott	464	0.89	−2.24
REG	Léna Decker	17	0.03	N/A
LO	Marc Baud-Bertier	438	0.84	N/A
LR	Fabien Di Filippo	18,659	35.75	−10.23
RN	Océane Simon	22,265	42.66	+21.54
Turnout		52,190	97.93	+51.41
Registered electors		80,777		
2nd round result
LR	Fabien Di Filippo	29,287	54.83	+19.08
RN	Océane Simon	24,127	45.17	+2.51
Turnout		53,414	97.29	−0.64
Registered electors		80,786		
LR hold		Swing		

=== 2022 ===
Legislative Election 2022: Moselle's 4th constituency
Party	Candidate	Votes	%	±%
LR (UDC)	Fabien Di Filippo	17,014	45.98	+27.33
RN	Michel Rambour	7,853	21.22	+1.90
MoDem (Ensemble)	Emilie Crenner	4,974	13.44	−13.83
PCF (NUPÉS)	Hélène Girardot	4,912	13.27	+0.44
REC	Chloé Konarski	1,158	3.13	N/A
Others	N/A	1,091	-	−
Turnout		37,002	46.52	−0.65
2nd round result
LR (UDC)	Fabien Di Filippo	22,655	69.30	+16.01
RN	Michel Rambour	10,038	30.70	N/A
Turnout		32,693	42.52	+1.15
LR hold				

=== 2017 ===
Candidate	Label	First round		Second round	
Candidate	Label	Votes	%	Votes	%
Mathilde Huchot	REM	10,198	27.27	14,102	46.71
Fabien Di Filippo	LR	6,976	18.65	16,089	53.29
Amélie de La Rochère	FN	6,853	18.32		
Patrick Reichheld	DVD	3,544	9.48		
Emmanuel Riehl	DIV	2,593	6.93		
Catherine Grosse	FI	2,234	5.97		
Rémy Hamant	PS	1,229	3.29		
Brigitte Albertus	ECO	959	2.56		
Didier Conte	DLF	742	1.98		
Cédric Soualmia	DVD	691	1.85		
Philippe Mouraux	REG	417	1.11		
Hélène Girardot	PCF	379	1.01		
Simon Giessinger	DIV	263	0.70		
Pierre Nordemann	EXG	220	0.59		
Norbert Degrelle	EXD	102	0.27		
Lise Gerdil	DVD	0	0.00		
Votes		37,400	100.00	30,191	100.00
Valid votes		37,400	97.31	30,191	89.58
Blank votes		793	2.06	2,668	7.92
Null votes		239	0.62	844	2.50
Turnout		38,432	47.17	33,703	41.37
Abstentions		43,049	52.83	47,773	58.63
Registered voters		81,481		81,476	
Source: Ministry of the Interior

=== 2012 ===
Legislative Election 2012: Moselle's 4th constituency
Party	Candidate	Votes	%	±%
UMP	Alain Marty	18,362	39.80	
PS	Jean-Yves Schaff	13,471	29.20	
FN	Cassandre Fristot	11,180	24.23	
FG	Estelle Gallot	1,454	3.15	
Others	N/A	1,670		
Turnout		46,137	56.83	
2nd round result
UMP	Alain Marty	19,273	41.39	
PS	Jean-Yves Schaff	15,940	34.23	
FN	Cassandre Fristot	11,356	24.39	
Turnout		46,569	57.37	
UMP hold				

== Sources ==
Official results of French elections from 2002: "Résultats électoraux officiels en France" (in French).
