= Xouaxange =

- Commune
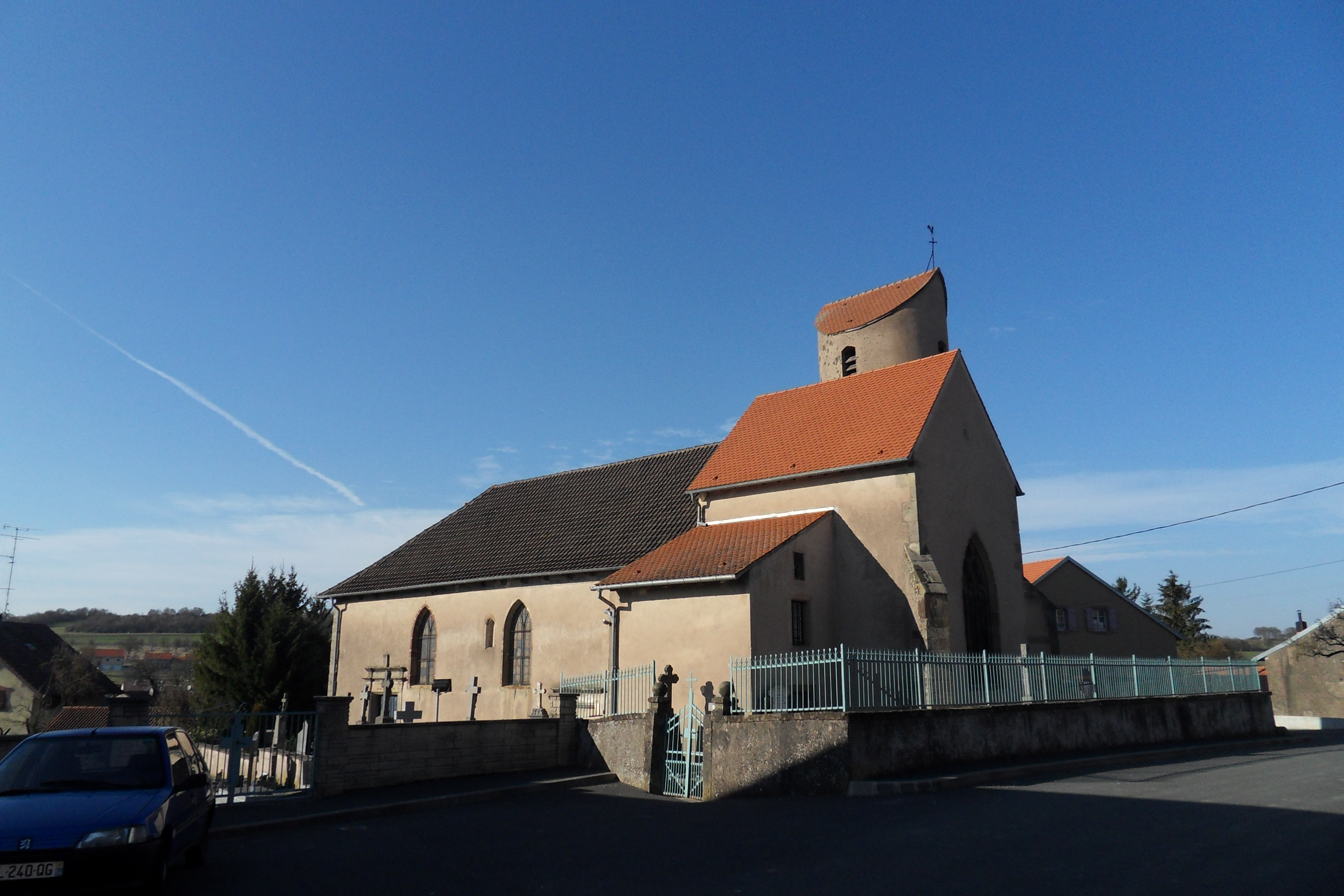
- The church in Xouaxange

- Coat of arms
- Location of Xouaxange
- Location within France Location within Grand Est
- Coordinates: 48°41′51″N 6°59′52″E
- Country: France
- Region: Grand Est
- Department: Moselle
- Arrondissement: Sarrebourg-Château-Salins
- Canton: Phalsbourg
- Intercommunality: Sarrebourg-Moselle Sud

Government
  - Mayor (2020–2026): Rémy Marchal
- Area^{1}: 5.16 km^{2} (1.99 sq mi)
- Elevation: 270 m (890 ft)
- Highest elevation: 341 m (1,119 ft)
- Lowest elevation: 255 m (837 ft)
- Population (2023): 325
  - Density: 63.0/km^{2} (163/sq mi)
- Time zone: UTC+01:00 (CET)
  - Summer (DST): UTC+02:00 (CEST)
- INSEE/Postal code: 57756 /57830
- ^{1} French Land Register data, which excludes lakes, ponds, glaciers > 1 km^{2} (0.386 sq mi or 247 acres) and river estuaries.

Xouaxange (French pronunciation: [ʃwa.sɑ̃ʒ]; German: Schweixingen) is a commune in the Moselle department in Grand Est in north-eastern France.

== Population ==
Historical population
Year	Pop.	±% p.a.
1968	215	—
1975	199	−1.10%
1982	172	−2.06%
1990	258	+5.20%
1999	363	+3.87%
2007	344	−0.67%
2012	339	−0.29%
2017	305	−2.09%
2023	325	+1.06%
Source: INSEE

== See also ==
- Communes of the Moselle department
