= Arrondissements of the Moselle department =

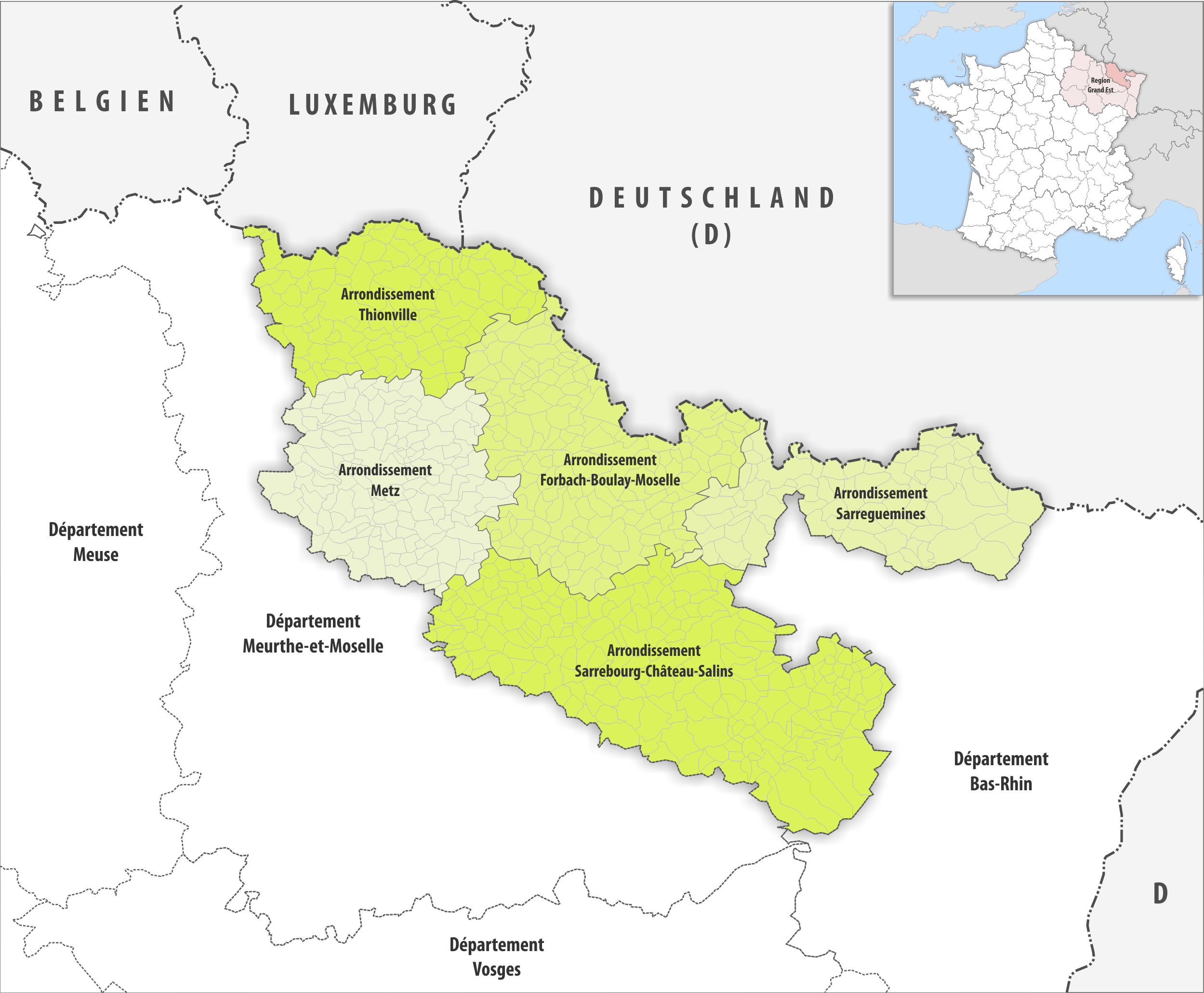
Map of arrondissements of the Moselle department.

The five arrondissements of the Moselle department are:

1. Arrondissement of Forbach-Boulay-Moselle, (subprefecture: Forbach) with 169 communes. The population of the arrondissement was 237,242 in 2021.
2. Arrondissement of Metz, (prefecture of the Moselle department: Metz) with 139 communes. The population of the arrondissement was 352,594 in 2021.
3. Arrondissement of Sarrebourg-Château-Salins, (subprefecture: Sarrebourg) with 230 communes. The population of the arrondissement was 90,770 in 2021.
4. Arrondissement of Sarreguemines, (subprefecture: Sarreguemines) with 83 communes. The population of the arrondissement was 96,273 in 2021.
5. Arrondissement of Thionville, (subprefecture: Thionville) with 104 communes. The population of the arrondissement was 273,063 in 2021.

== History ==
In 1800 the arrondissements of Metz, Briey, Sarreguemines and Thionville were established. In 1871 most of the department was ceded to Germany, except the arrondissement of Briey that joined the new department Meurthe-et-Moselle. In 1919 the department of Moselle was restored, with the arrondissements of Metz-Ville, Metz-Campagne, Boulay-Moselle, Château-Salins, Forbach, Sarrebourg, Sarreguemines, Thionville-Est and Thionville-Ouest. In January 2000 the canton of Sarralbe passed from the arrondissement of Forbach to the arrondissement of Sarreguemines.

In January 2015 the arrondissements of Forbach and Boulay-Moselle were merged into the new arrondissement of the arrondissements of Forbach-Boulay-Moselle, the arrondissements of Metz-Campagne and Metz-Ville were merged into the new arrondissement of Metz and the arrondissements of Thionville-Est and Thionville-Ouest were merged into the new arrondissement of Thionville. In January 2016 the arrondissements of Sarrebourg and Château-Salins were merged into the new arrondissement of Sarrebourg-Château-Salins.
