= Basse Yutz Flagons =

Iron Age Celtic drinking vessels

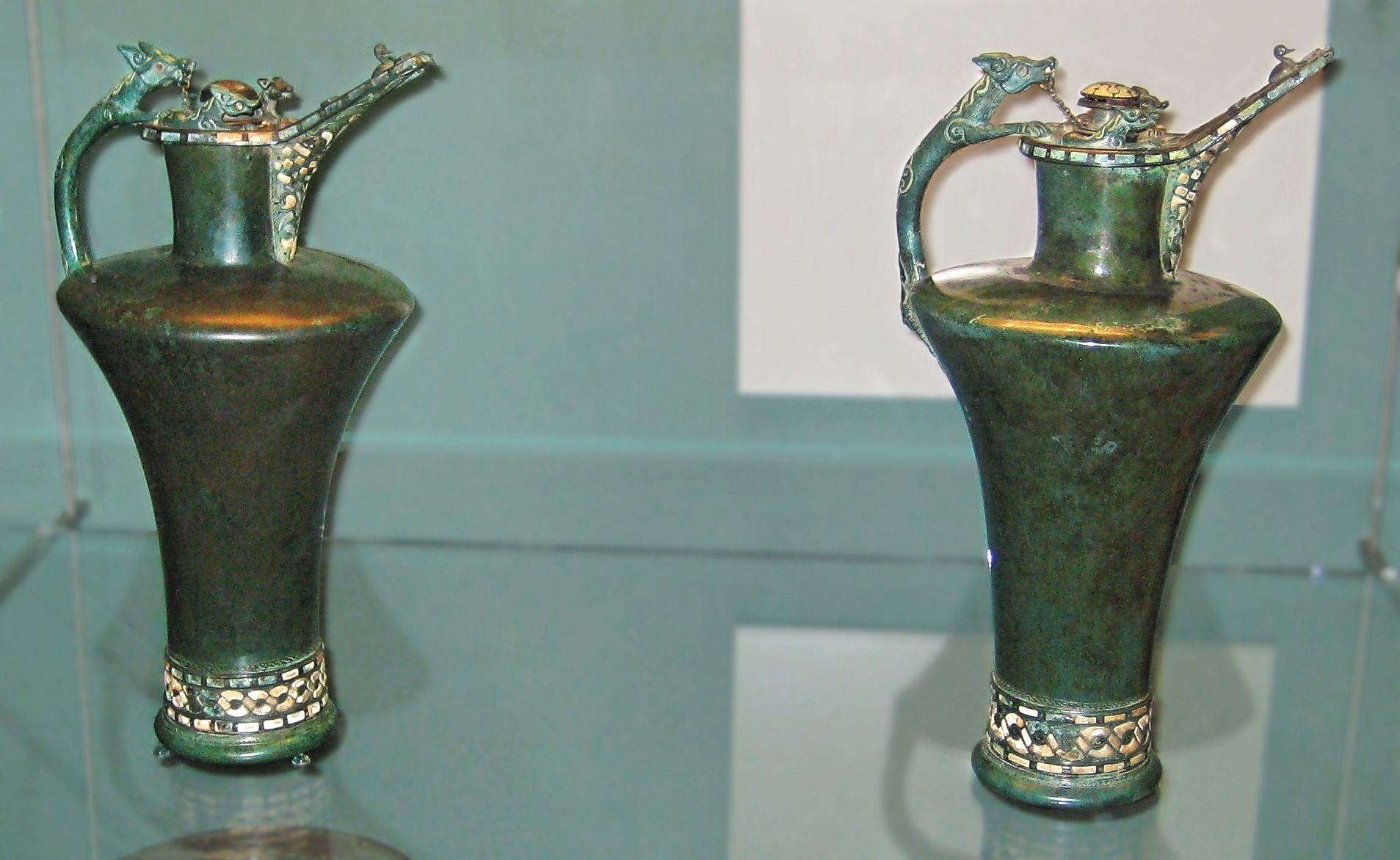
- The Basse Yutz Flagons as displayed in the British Museum
- Material: Copper alloy, coral, glass and resin
- Size: 40 cm high
- Created: mid-5th century BCE
- Discovered: Basse Yutz, France
- Present location: British Museum, London
- Registration: Palart.550

The Basse Yutz Flagons are a pair of Iron Age ceremonial drinking vessels that date from the mid 5th century BCE. Since their discovery in ill-documented circumstances in the 1920s and their subsequent purchase by the British Museum, they have been described as "great masterpieces" that "combine most of the key features of early Celtic Art". They are in many respects very similar to the Dürrnberg Flagon found in Austria.

== Description ==
The almost identical pair of flagons imitate the shape of contemporary Etruscan flagons and are made of a copper alloy that was skilfully beaten into shape from a single sheet of metal. The base was cast to size and decorated with 120 pieces of red coral and glass and then attached using resin. Resin is also used to coat the inside, which makes the flagon watertight. The cast spout and lid is attached using pins into a cutout made in the copper sheet body. X-rays reveal that the resin and the pins were the only materials used by the artisans to assemble these artefacts; although there is some evidence of solder that dates from the 20th century. The bases were apparently left open until the end of construction and the flagons were only water-tight because of a coating of resin over the whole inside of the vessel. They had evidently been well-used, and the chains currently attaching the stoppers on the lids are later additions that had been made to replace earlier fittings.

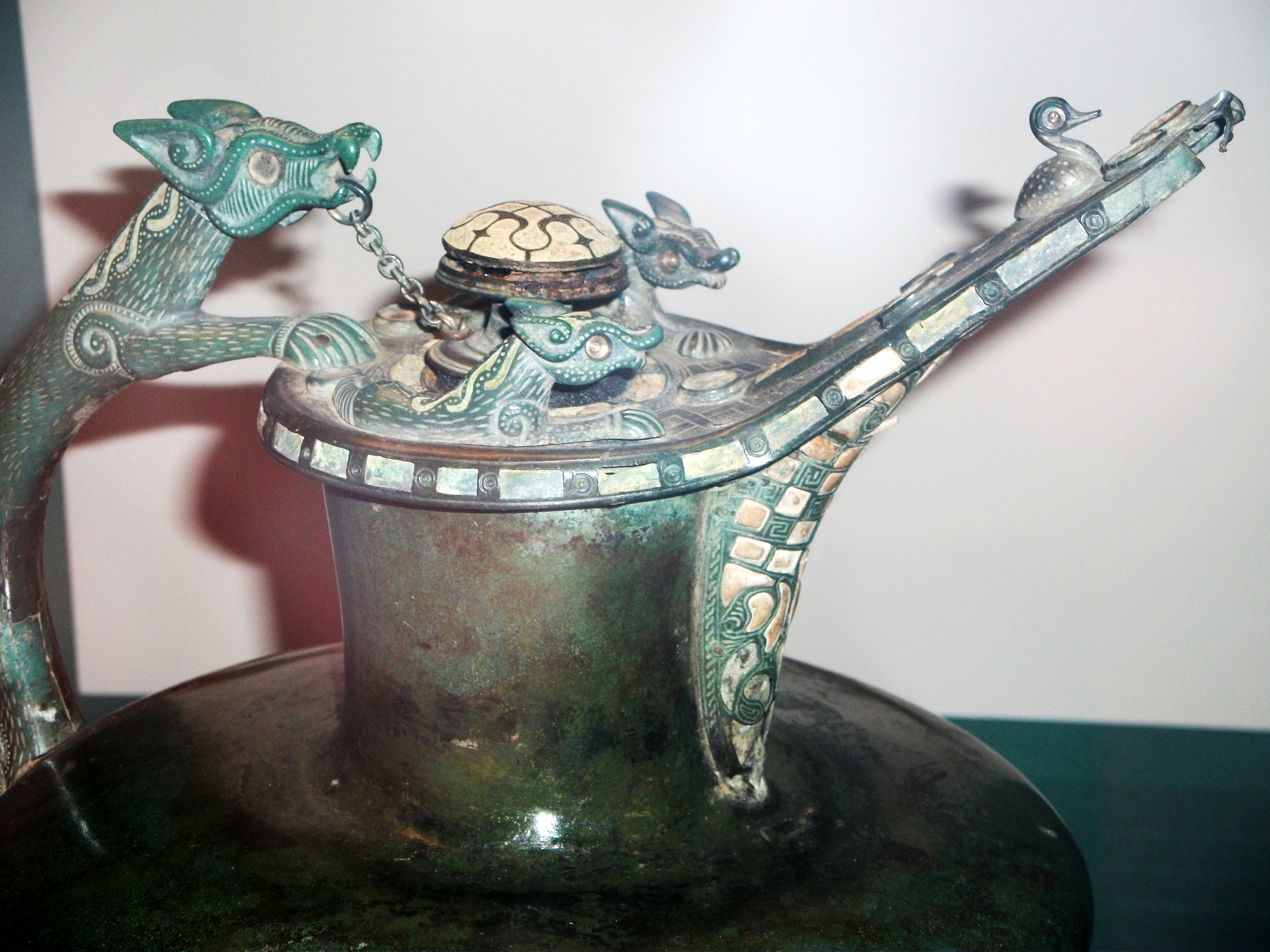
Detail of the lid of one of the flagons

The flagons are richly decorated with glass and coral inlays and a range of animals on the lid. Time has faded the coral but the pieces would have been brightly coloured. The handle is formed as a dog, terminating at the bottom with a human face. The idea of a dog or other animal for a handle comes from Greek and Etruscan culture, as does the motif of two crouching animals lying around the rim, as well as the head at the bottom of the handle. The duck on the spout is a Celtic addition to the scheme. The eyes of the duck and the dogs have been finished by using a complex drill bit and they were drilled by the same person. Both vessels measure just over 40 cm in height. The drinking vessels were found with a pair of Etruscan bronze stamnoi or vessels for wine-mixing that date from the same period (also now in the British Museum).

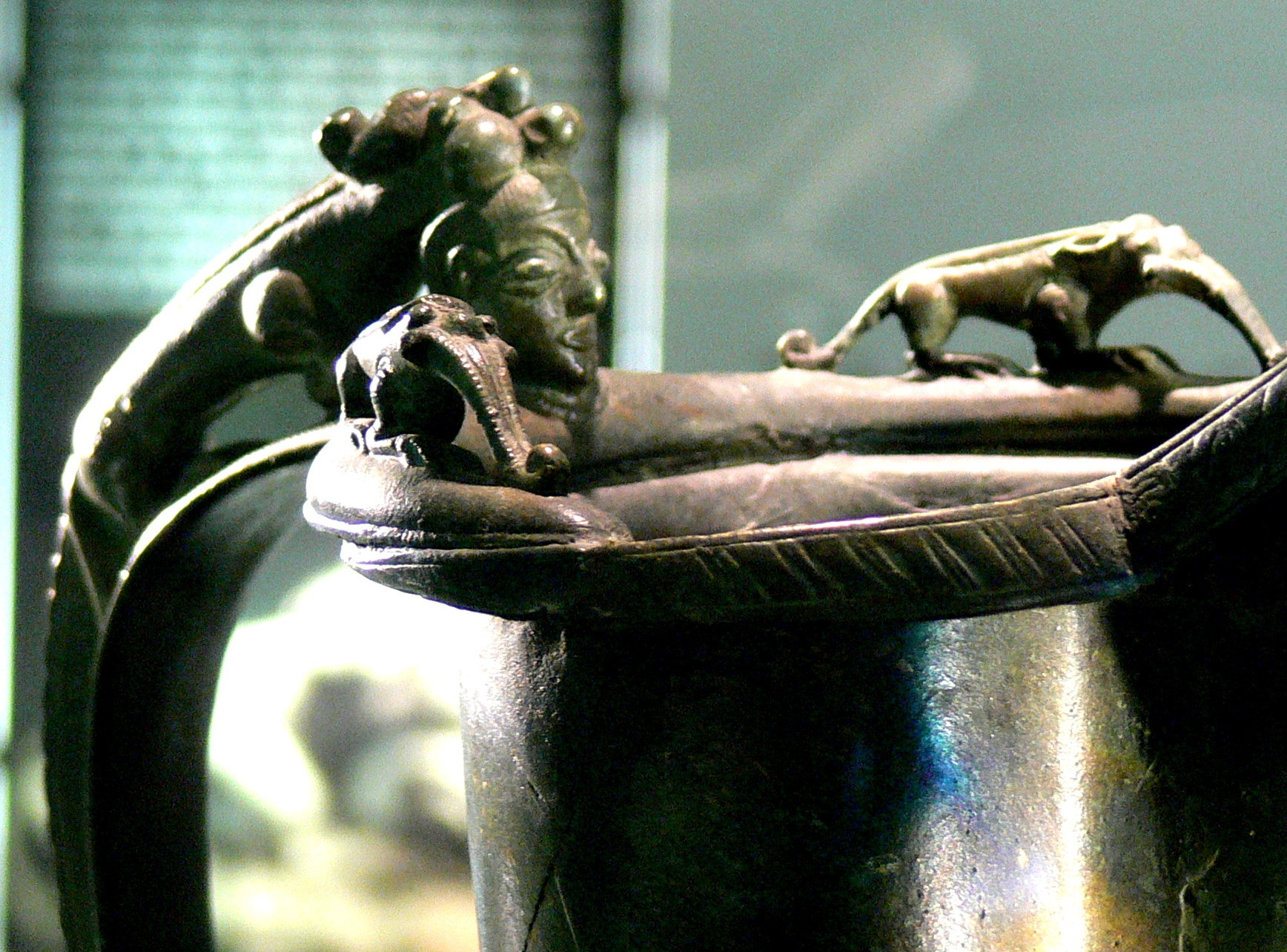
Similar decoration from the lid of the Dürnberg flagon

Other comparable Celtic adaptions of the classical flagon shape have survived. Among them, a late 5th-century example from a chariot-burial at Dürrnberg (now Keltenmuseum in Hallein, Austria) has similar animals to the three dogs, and human heads at the bottom of the handle as well as on the lid. Here the whole body is decorated with raised vertical ribs with an elegant abstracted design suggesting plant-forms at top and bottom. The flagon only uses bronze. Other examples are from Kleinaspergle, Hohenasperg, near Stuttgart, and Borsch.

== Circumstances of the find ==
The two flagons and two stamnoi were apparently found in 1927 during the course of railway construction in the town of Basse Yutz, Moselle, eastern France. The excavators had probably discovered the grave of an important Celtic dignitary from the local Iron Age. Unfortunately, little is known of the local circumstances of their discovery, as the grave was dug illicitly without the help of trained archeologists. Within two years of the discovery, all four objects were sold to the British Museum. They were bought for £5,000 which was a substantial sum, especially as many thought they were too sophisticated to be genuine.

== Artistic importance ==
The Basse Yutz flagons represent one of the high points of La Tène Celtic art. Very few other objects from that era can compare in terms of aesthetic quality and elegance. The two flagons were featured in the BBC Radio 4 series A History of the World in 100 Objects in 2010, where the flagons were put in context. At the time of their manufacture there were no cities in non-Mediterranean Europe, but there were small communities with skilful metal-working facilities. The flagons show also that these communities had trading links with more distant areas of Europe: shapes in the designs of palm leaves indicate cultural links to Egypt, and tin in the alloy would probably have come from Cornwall in England. The basic idea of a flagon in this shape comes from Italy, but these artefacts show that the people we know as "the Celts", although illiterate, had a complex and sophisticated culture of their own.

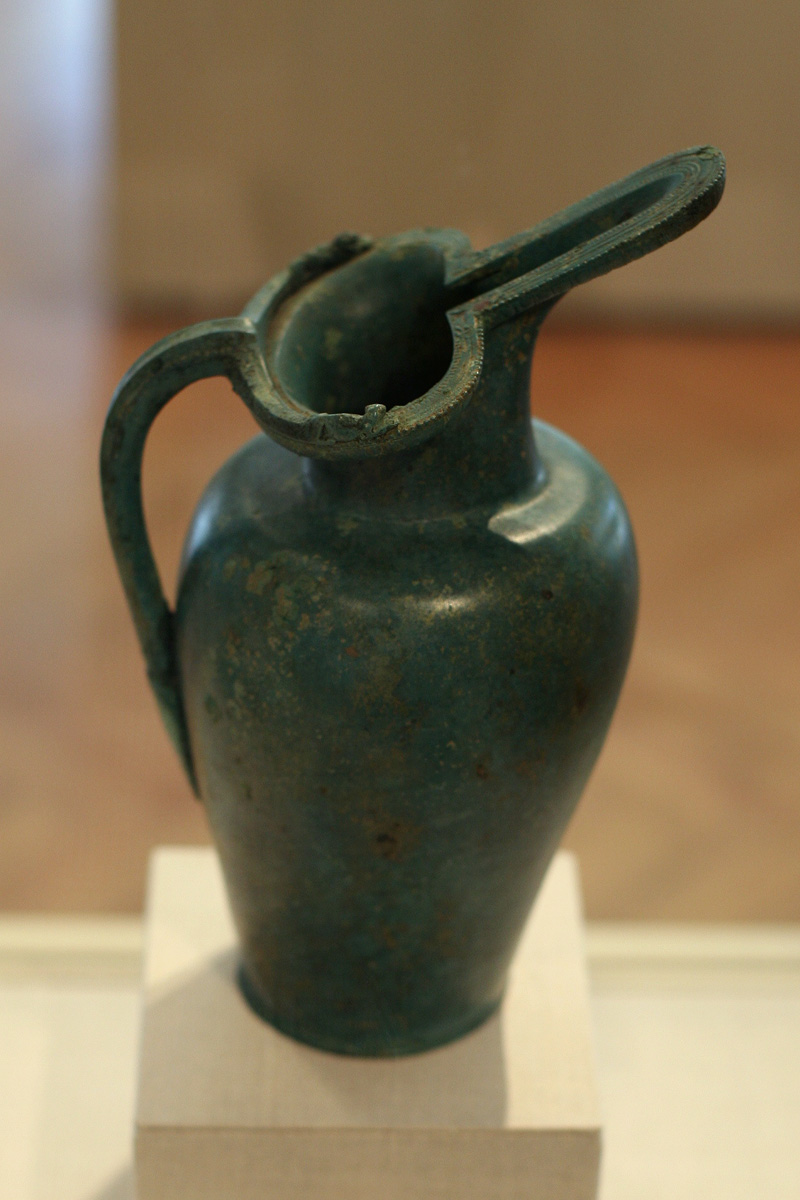
Etruscan flagon; note the two reclining animals on the rim.

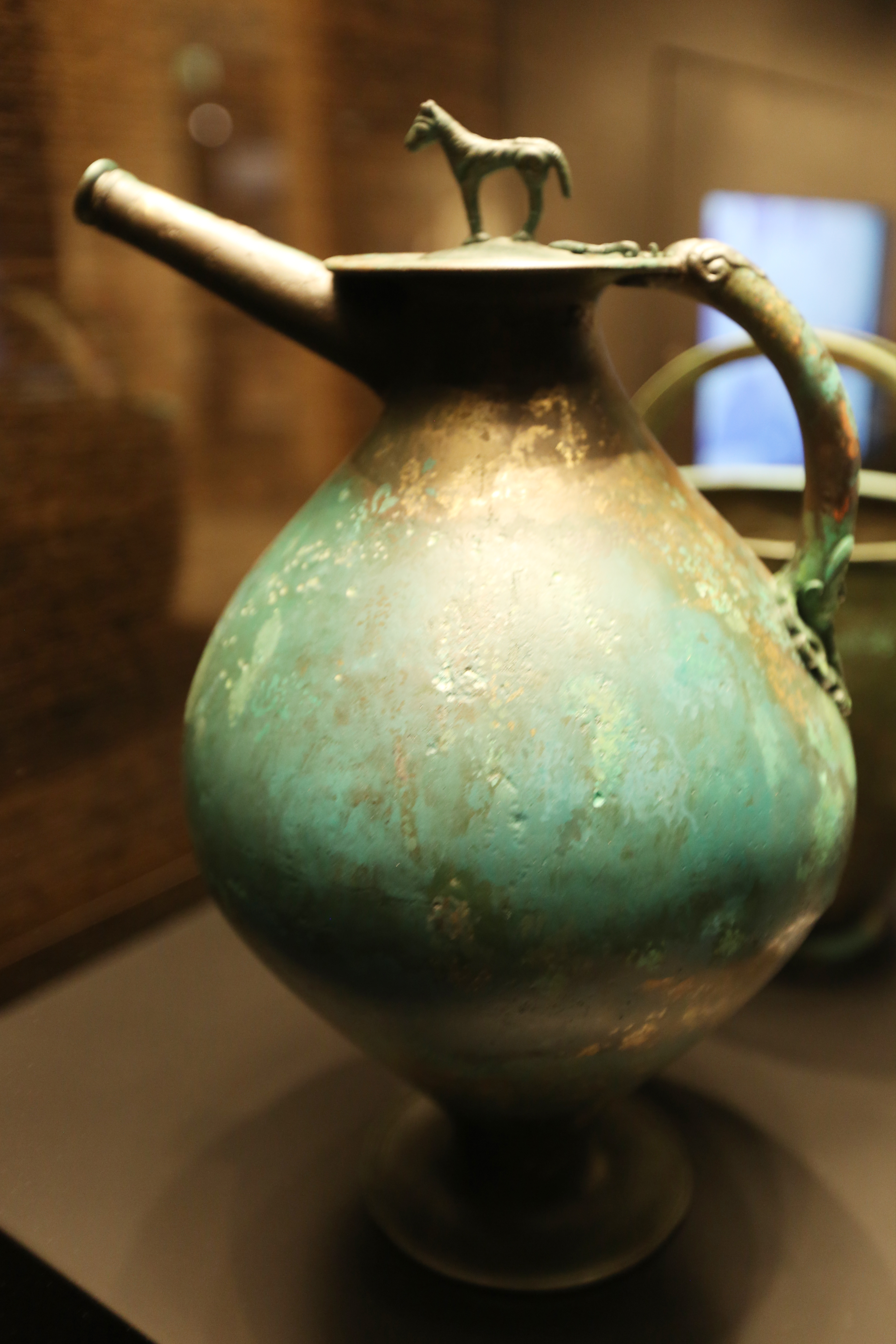
Another Italian shape adapted by Celts, Waldalgesheim chariot burial, 330-320 BC

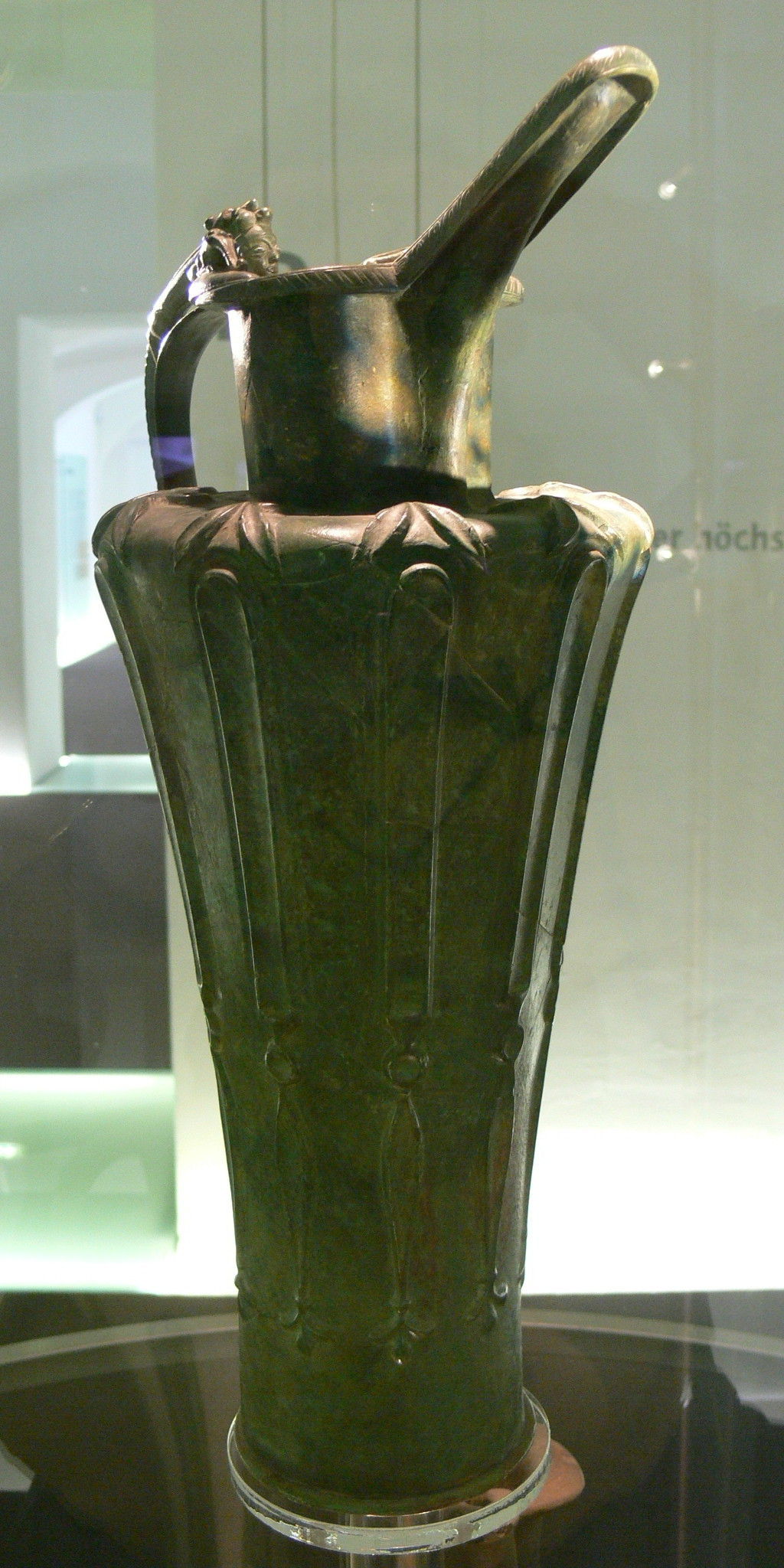
Dürnberg flagon

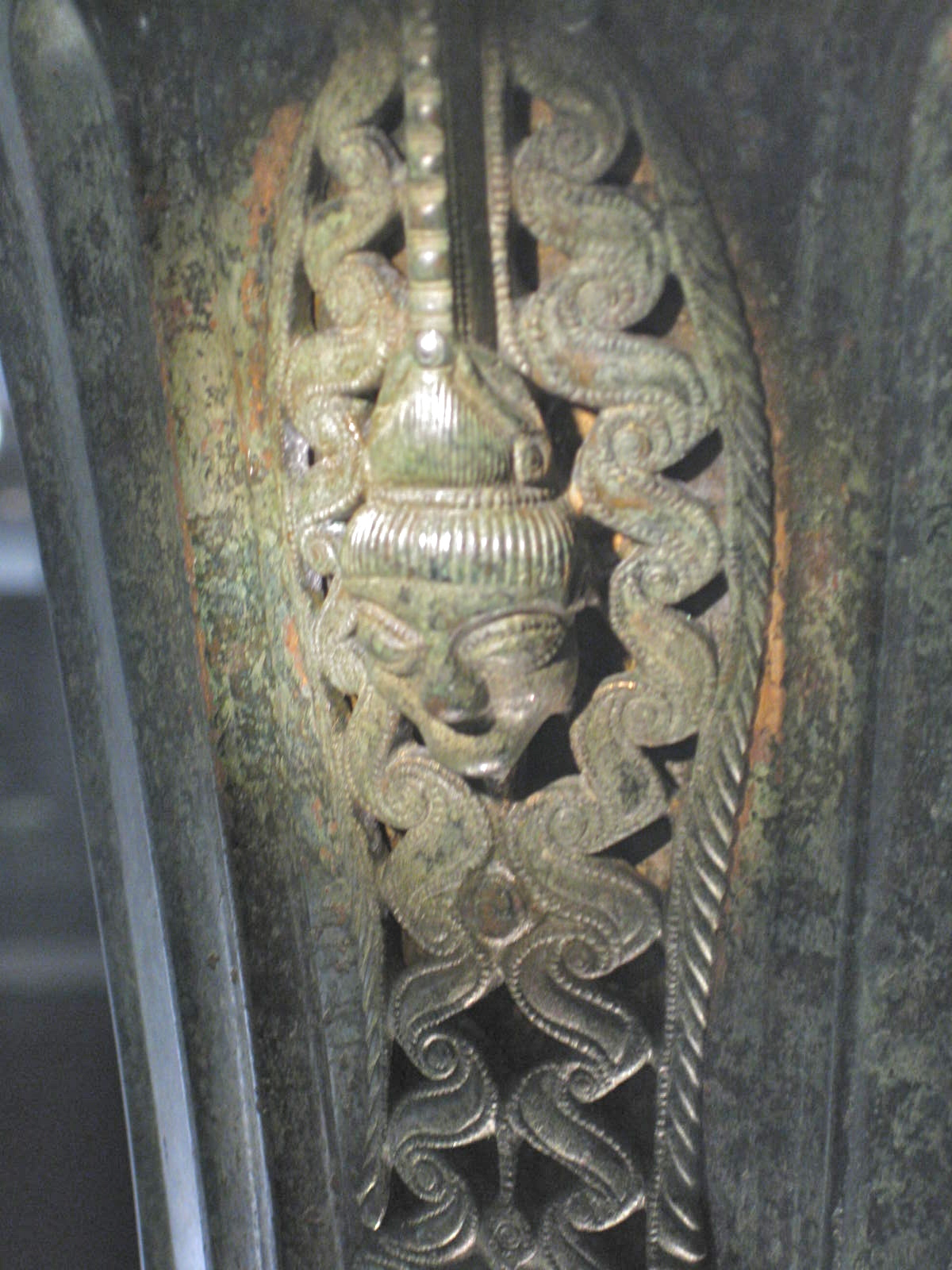
Base of the handle at Dürnberg; the head has a characteristic Celtic leaf-crown.

== Notes ==
Preceded by 27: Parthenon sculptures	A History of the World in 100 Objects; Object 28	Succeeded by 29: Olmec stone mask
