= Anne Grommerch =

French politician (1970–2016)

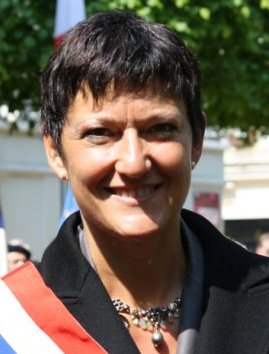
- Grommerch in 2012
- Born: 11 December 1970; Thionville, France
- Died: 15 April 2016 (aged 45); Esch-sur-Alzette, Luxembourg
- Occupation: Politician

Anne Grommerch (French pronunciation: [an ɡʁɔmɛʁʃ], 11 December 1970 – 15 April 2016) was a French politician who was a member of the National Assembly of France.

Born in Thionville, she represented the Moselle department, and was a member of the Union for a Popular Movement. She replaced Jean-Marie Demange. Grommerch was also elected Mayor of Thionville in 2014.

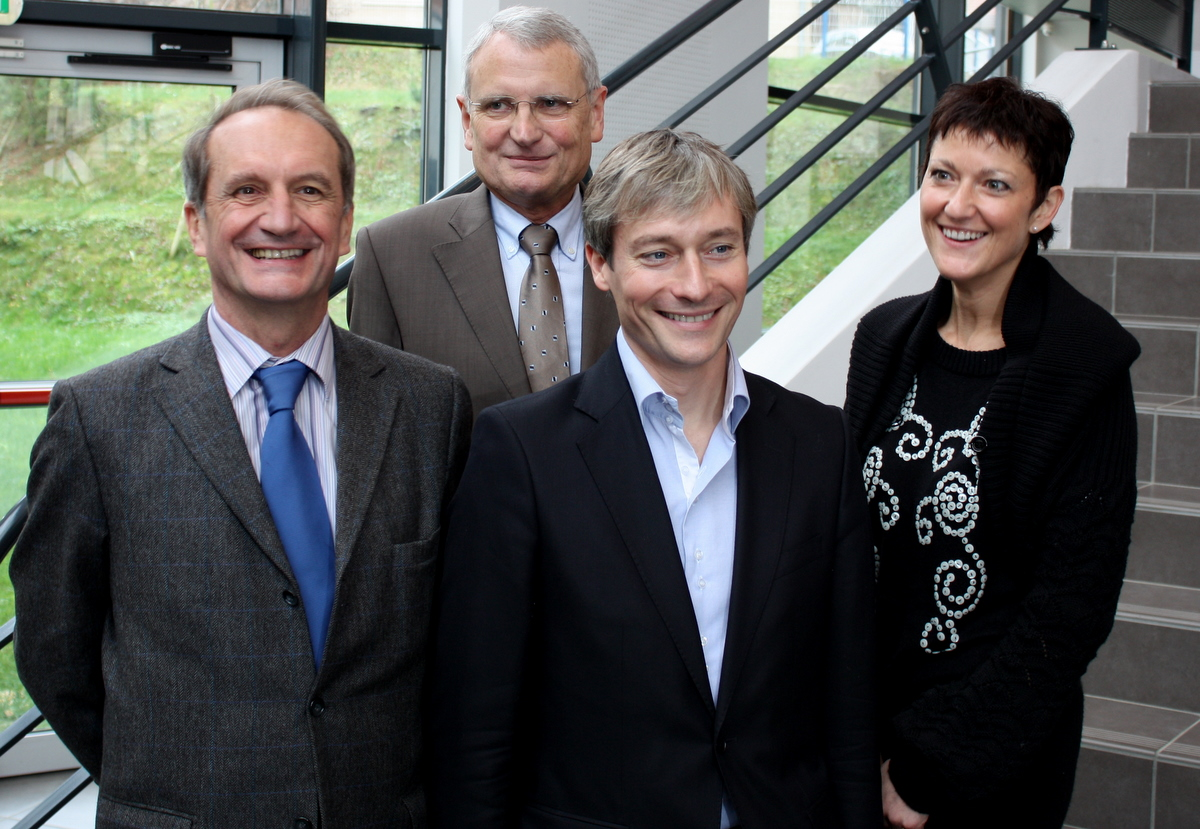
Anne Gromerch with Laurent Hénart

Grommerch developed breast cancer in 2007; there is a family history of the disease. She died on 15 April 2016, aged 45.
