= Cantons of the Moselle department =

The following is a list of the 27 cantons of the Moselle department, in France, following the French canton reorganisation which came into effect in March 2015:

- Algrange
- Bitche
- Boulay-Moselle
- Bouzonville
- Les Coteaux de Moselle
- Fameck
- Faulquemont
- Forbach
- Freyming-Merlebach
- Hayange
- Metz-1
- Metz-2
- Metz-3
- Metzervisse
- Montigny-lès-Metz
- Le Pays Messin
- Phalsbourg
- Rombas
- Saint-Avold
- Sarralbe
- Sarrebourg
- Sarreguemines
- Le Saulnois
- Le Sillon Mosellan
- Stiring-Wendel
- Thionville
- Yutz
