= Yutz =

Yutz Jäiz (Luxembourgish)
- Commune
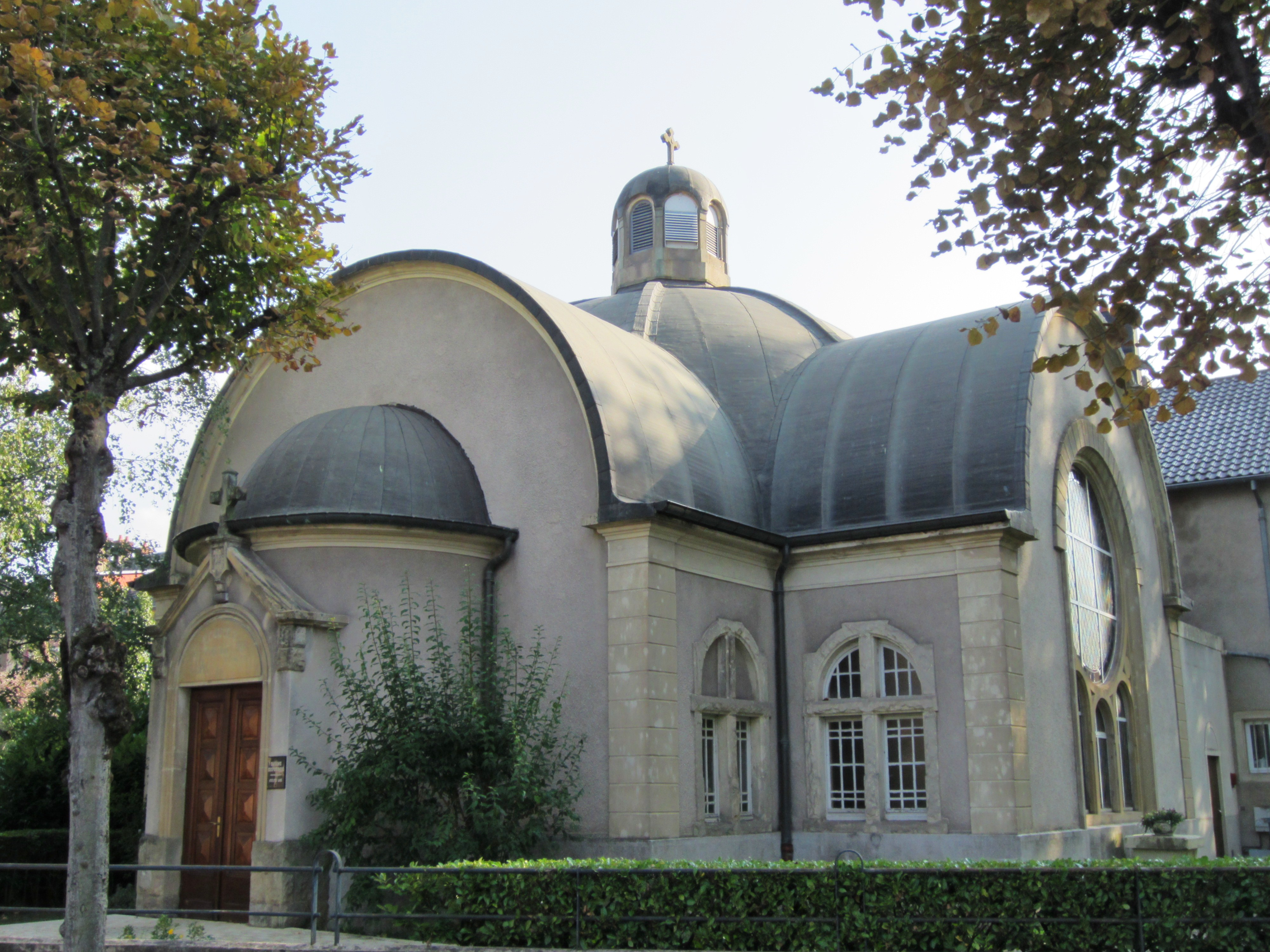
- The Protestant temple in Yutz

- Coat of arms
- Location of Yutz
- Location within France Location within Grand Est
- Coordinates: 49°21′34″N 6°11′21″E
- Country: France
- Region: Grand Est
- Department: Moselle
- Arrondissement: Thionville
- Canton: Yutz
- Intercommunality: CA Portes de France-Thionville

Government
  - Mayor (2020–2026): Clémence Pouget
- Area^{1}: 13.97 km^{2} (5.39 sq mi)
- Elevation: 160 m (520 ft)
- Highest elevation: 217 m (712 ft)
- Lowest elevation: 147 m (482 ft)
- Population (2023): 17,391
  - Density: 1,245/km^{2} (3,224/sq mi)
- Time zone: UTC+01:00 (CET)
  - Summer (DST): UTC+02:00 (CEST)
- INSEE/Postal code: 57757 /57970
- ^{1} French Land Register data, which excludes lakes, ponds, glaciers > 1 km^{2} (0.386 sq mi or 247 acres) and river estuaries.

Yutz (French pronunciation: [jyts]; German: Jeutz [jɔʏts]; Lorraine Franconian/Luxembourgish: Jäiz [jæːɪ̯ts]) is a commune in the Moselle department in Grand Est in north-eastern France, close to the borders with both Luxembourg and Germany. It was created in 1971 by merging the former communes of Basse-Yutz and Haute-Yutz. Macquenom is also a part of the commune since 1810.

The town is located by the river Moselle where it borders with the city of Thionville. The famous Basse Yutz Flagons, considered by many to be the apogee of Celtic art, were found in the area. They now form part of the British Museum's collection.

The inhabitants are called Yussois.

== Population ==
Historical population
Year	Pop.	±% p.a.
1968	16,615	—
1975	17,029	+0.35%
1982	15,444	−1.39%
1990	13,920	−1.29%
1999	14,687	+0.60%
2007	16,019	+1.09%
2012	15,776	−0.31%
2017	16,537	+0.95%
2023	17,391	+0.84%
Source: INSEE

== People born in the town ==
- François Zimmer (1860 – ap. 1918), Lorraine political man, member of the Landtag of Alsace-Lorraine from 1911 to 1918, was born in Basse-Yutz July 8, 1860.
- Annelise Reichmann (1902–2000), German painter, born in Basse-Yutz January 3, 1902.
- Elisabeth Grümmer (1911–1986), opera singer, born in Basse-Yutz March 31, 1911.
- Paul-Joseph Schmitt (1911–1987), Bishop of Metz from 1958 to 1987, was born in Basse-Yutz March 31, 1911.
- Wilhelm Emrich (1909–1998), German literary critic, professor at the Free University of Berlin, publisher, born in Basse-Yutz November 29, 1909.
- Rolland Ehrhardt (1941–2007), French former professional footballer from 1956 to 1975 born in Haute-Yutz February 22, 1941.

== Personalities linked to the town ==
- Jean Mermoz, pilot based at the airfield Thionville – Basse-Yutz.
- Jean Rongoni, French footballer from 1954 to 1960, born in 1932 in Volmerange-les-Mines.
- Jean Vodaine, Franco-Slovenian worker-poet-writer-typographer and painter, winner of many international awards (1921–2006), born July 6, 1921, in Volče, Slovenia.

== See also ==
- Communes of the Moselle department
- Website of the Town Hall
- Website on the history of Yutz through its streets and shops
