= Fabien Di Filippo =

French politician

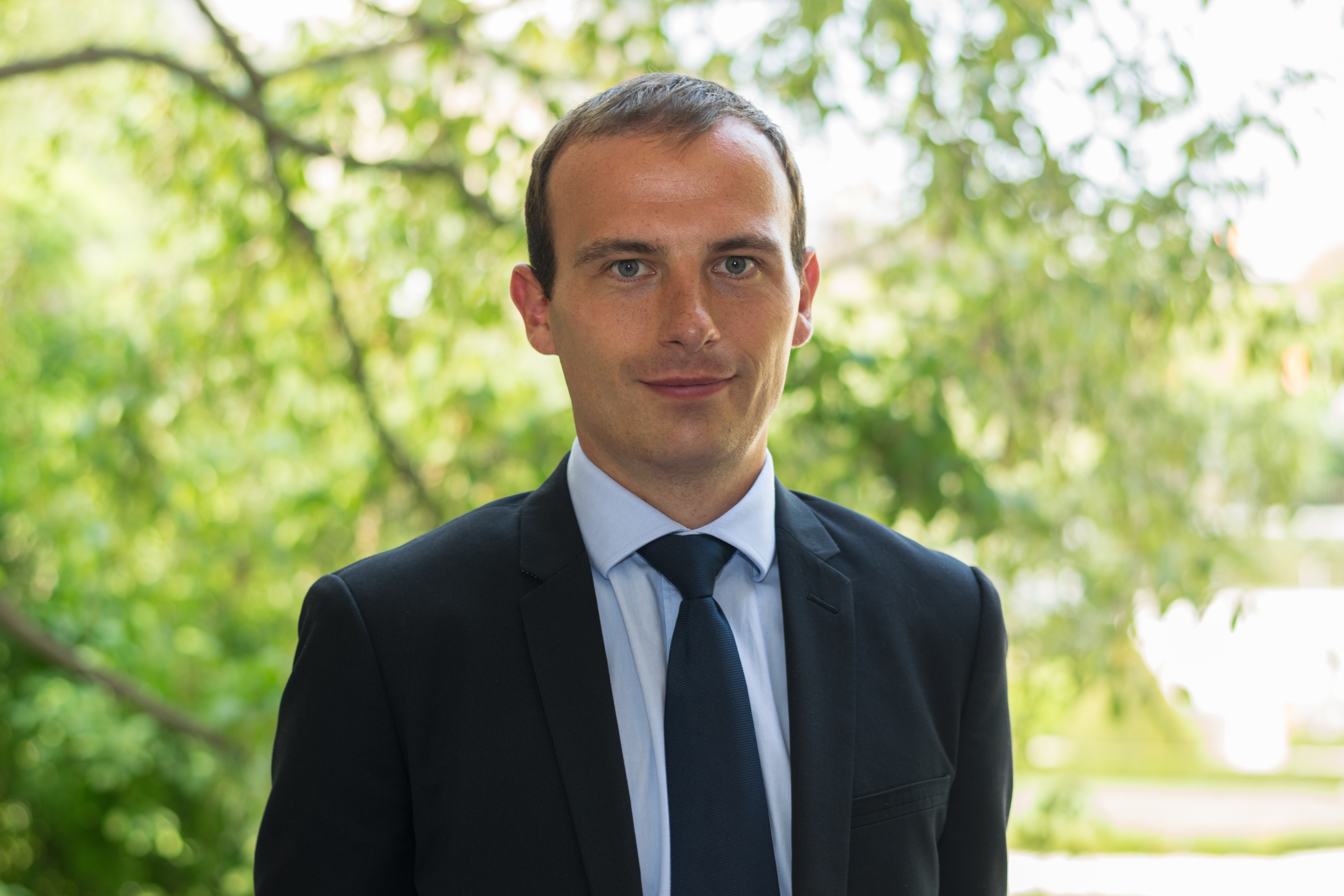

Member of the National Assembly for Moselle's 4th constituency
- Incumbent
- Assumed office 21 June 2017
- Preceded by: Alain Marty

Personal details
- Born: 23 August 1986 (age 39) Sarrebourg, France
- Party: The Republicans
- Education: Sciences Po

Fabien Di Filippo (born 23 August 1986) is a French politician of The Republicans who was elected to the French National Assembly on 18 June 2017, representing the 4th constituency of Moselle.

== Political career ==
In parliament, Di Filippo serves on the Committee on Economic Affairs. From 2018 until 2019, he was also a member of the Defence Committee.

In the Republicans' 2017 leadership election, Di Filippo endorsed Laurent Wauquiez and later joined his campaign's team. He later supported Christian Jacob to succeed Wauquiez as the party's chairman in the run-up to the Republicans' 2019 convention.

Di Filippo was re-elected in the 2022 French legislative election.

In the Republicans' 2025 leadership election, Di Filippo again endorsed Wauquiez to succeed Éric Ciotti as the party's new chair and joined his campaign team.

== Political positions ==
In July 2019, Di Filippo voted against the French ratification of the European Union's Comprehensive Economic and Trade Agreement (CETA) with Canada.

== See also ==
- 2017 French legislative election
