= Cantons of Metz =

Coordinates: 49.12°N 6.18°E

The cantons of Metz are administrative divisions of the Moselle department, in northeastern France. Since the French canton reorganisation which came into effect in March 2015, the city of Metz is subdivided into 3 cantons. Their seat is in Metz.

== Population ==
Name	Population (2019)	Cantonal Code
Canton of Metz-1	37,634	5711
Canton of Metz-2	40,543	5712
Canton of Metz-3	40,312	5713
