= André Wojciechowski =

French politician

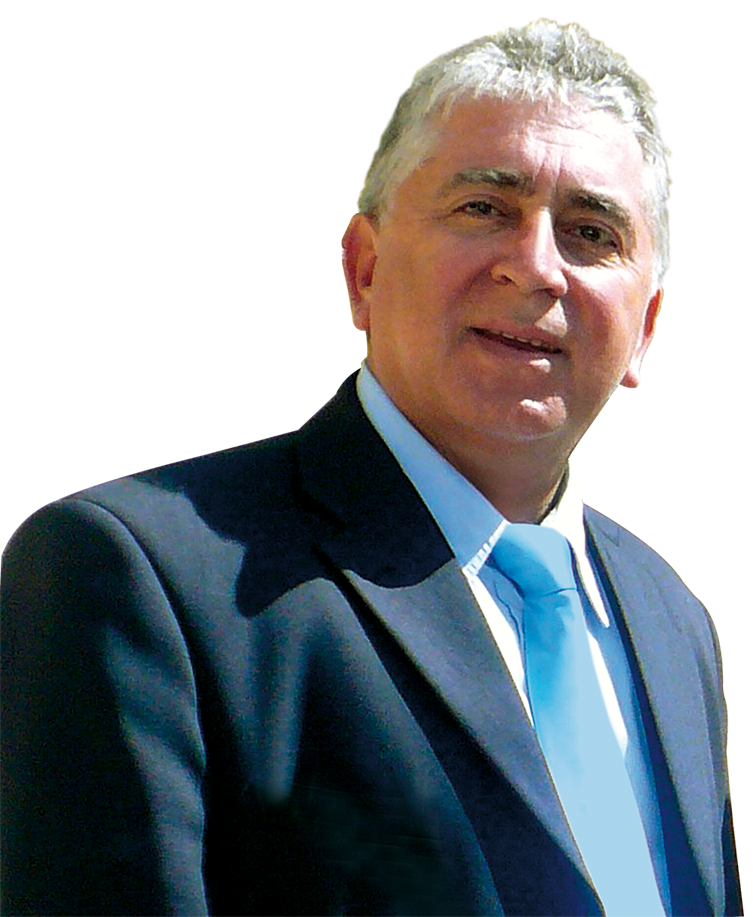
Portrait of André Wojciechowski, used during the 2012 legislative campaign.

André Wojciechowski (born 17 April 1956 in Créhange, Moselle) is a member of the National Assembly of France. He represents the Moselle department, and is a member of the Radical Party. In March 2015, he was elected departmental councillor for the canton of Saint-Avold in tandem with Patricia Boeglen.

== Origins ==
He is the first Polish French Mayor of a French town near the German-French border.
