= Jean-Marie Demange =

French politician, physician and criminal (1943–2008)

Mayor of Thionville
- In office 25 June 1995 – 21 March 2008

Personal details
- Born: Jean-Marie Demange; 23 July 1943 Toulouse, France
- Died: 17 November 2008 (aged 65)
- Occupation: politician

Jean-Marie Demange (23 July 1943 in Toulouse – 17 November 2008) was a French politician.

A member of the UMP he served as a member of the National Assembly from 1986 to 2008. He also served as the Mayor of Thionville for 13 years, serving in that capacity from 25 June 1995 to 21 March 2008.

He had been distraught after losing the 2008 election to a Socialist and committed suicide by gunshot after he killed his mistress following a heated argument.
