= Isabelle Rauch =

French politician (born 1968)

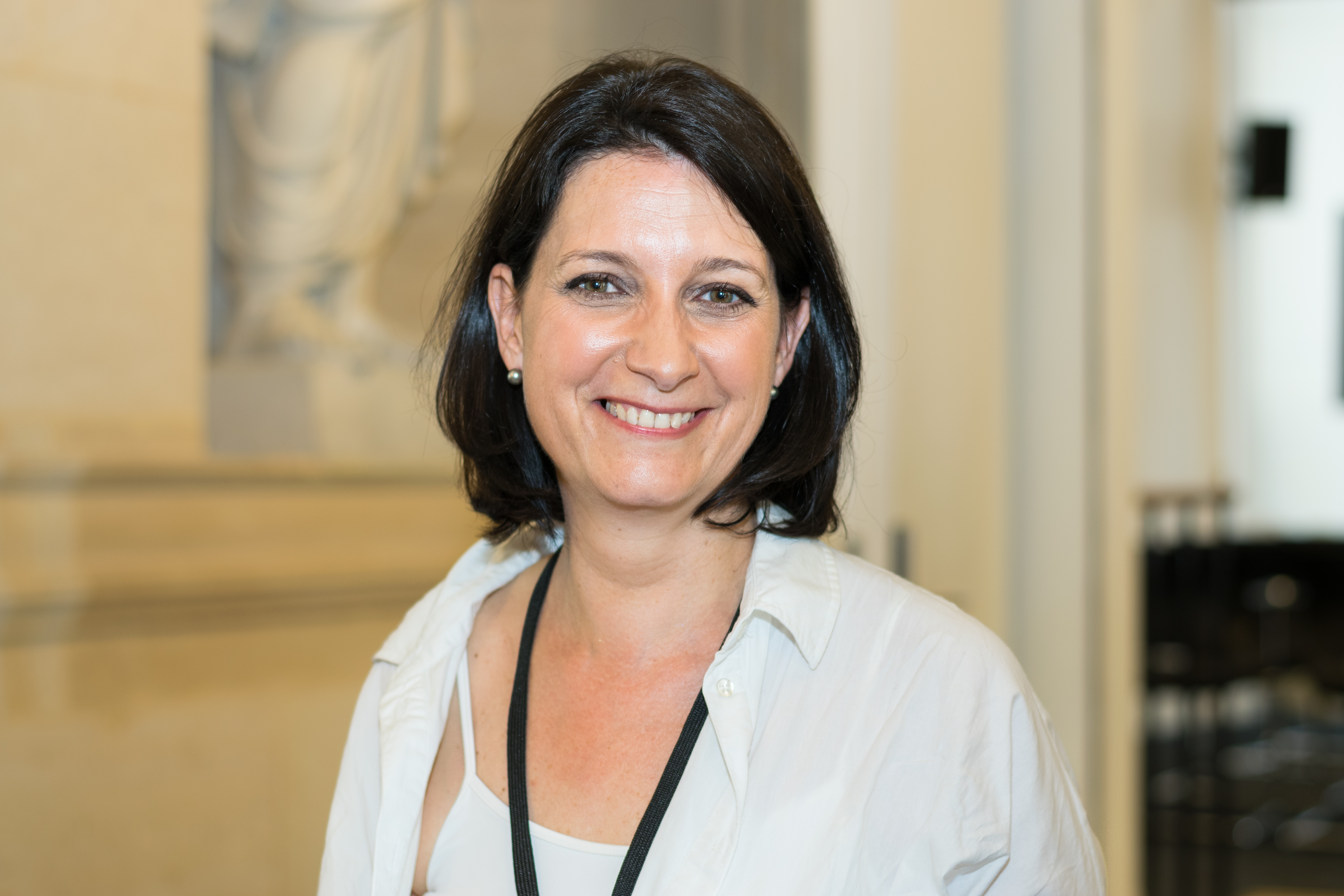

Member of the National Assembly for Moselle's 9th constituency
- Incumbent
- Assumed office 21 June 2017
- Preceded by: Patrick Weiten

Personal details
- Born: 10 August 1968 (age 57) Villers-Semeuse, France
- Party: Socialist Party (until 2015); UDI (2015-2016); La République En Marche! (2017-2022); Horizons (since 2022)

Isabelle Rauch (born 10 August 1968) is a French politician of Horizons (Ensemble) who has been serving as a member of the French National Assembly since the 2017 elections, representing the ninth constituency of the department of Moselle.

== Early life and career ==
Rauch grew up in the Ardennes and in Alsace. She has worked as a medicine salesperson, for an agricultural products company, in telephone sales, and as a business consultant. She studied at the ICN Business School in Nancy in 2014, and also has a specialist advanced diploma (diplôme d'études supérieures spécialisées) in marketing.

== Political career ==
Rauch first became involved in politics as a member of the Socialists, joining the party in 1997. She has spoken of her admiration for the then Prime Minister Lionel Jospin. Rauch was elected as a city councilor in 2001 and as a regional councilor in 2008. She left the Socialists for the Union of Democrats and Independents in 2015. However, she left the party after it endorsed Francois Fillon for the 2017 presidential election. She joined La République En Marche! (LREM) and was elected in the 2017 French legislative election with 70.13% of the vote, defeating her National Front opponent Emilie Matz.

In addition to her committee assignments, Rauch has been a member of the French delegation to the Parliamentary Assembly of the Council of Europe since 2017. In this capacity, she serves on the Committee on Equality and Non-Discrimination. Since 2019, she has also been a member of the French delegation to the Franco-German Parliamentary Assembly.

== Political positions ==
In July 2019, Rauch voted in favor of the French ratification of the European Union’s Comprehensive Economic and Trade Agreement (CETA) with Canada.

== Personal life ==
Rauch has four children.

== See also ==
- 2017 French legislative election
