= Alain Marty =

French politician

Alain Marty (born 7 March 1946 in Castelnaudary) is a member of the National Assembly of France. He represents the Moselle department, and is a member of the Union for a Popular Movement.
