= Alexandre Loubet =

French politician (born 1994)

Member of the National Assembly for Moselle's 7th constituency
- Incumbent
- Assumed office 22 June 2022
- Preceded by: Hélène Zannier

Personal details
- Born: 7 July 1994 (age 31) Toulouse, France
- Party: National Rally (2020–present); French Future (2021–present)
- Other political affiliations: Debout la France (2012–2020)
- Occupation: Consultant, politician

Alexandre Loubet (French pronunciation: [alɛksɑ̃dʁ(ə) lubɛ]; born 7 July 1994) is a French politician of the National Rally (RN) who has represented the 7th constituency of the Moselle department in the National Assembly since 2022.

== Biography ==
Loubet was born in 1994 and grew up in the Occitanie region. He worked in public relations for the EDF energy company.

He has described himself as a Gaullist in his beliefs and first joined the Debout la France party at the age of 18. He was president of its youth wing from 2015 to 2017 and then a communications director for party leader Nicolas Dupont-Aignan. At the end of 2020, he co-founded the Gaullist movement L'Avenir Français (The French Future) along with other DLF members such as Thomas Ménagé before joining the National Rally in 2021.

In 2021, Loubet was appointed communications director for the RN by Jordan Bardella. For the 2022 French presidential election, he was co-coordinator of communications and social media for Marine Le Pen's campaign. Loubet and members of the RN accused Twitter of censorship during the election after Twitter briefly suspended a number of accounts associated with conservative parties in France including that of Loubet's, several members of the RN and Eric Zemmour's Reconquete party and The Republicans Senator Bruno Retailleau. Twitter released a statement claiming the accounts had been suspended in error.

For the 2022 French legislative election, Loubet contested the seat of Moselle's 7th constituency and was successful at winning it during the second round.
