= 2022 French legislative election =

- 12 June 2022 (first round); 19 June 2022 (second round)

All 577 seats in the National Assembly 289 seats needed for a majority
- Opinion polls
- Turnout: 47.5% (▼1.2 pp) (1st round); 46.2% (▲3.6 pp) (2nd round)
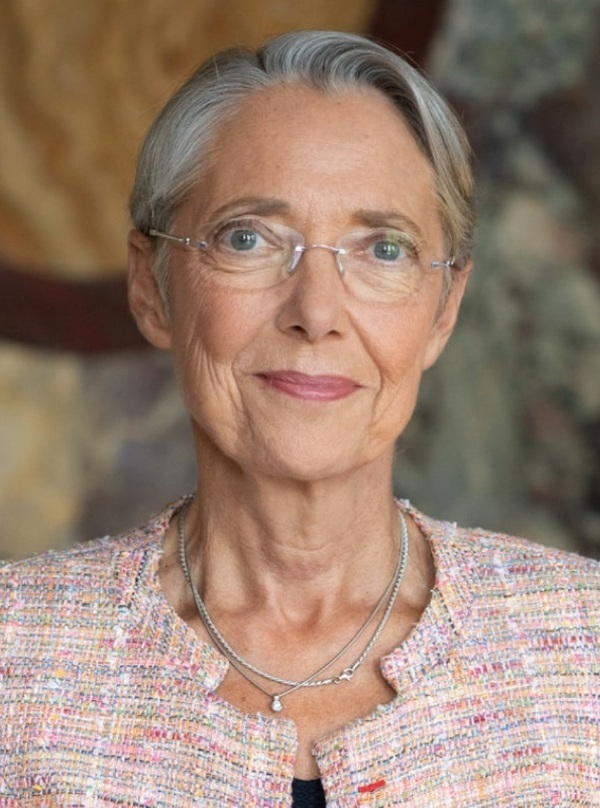

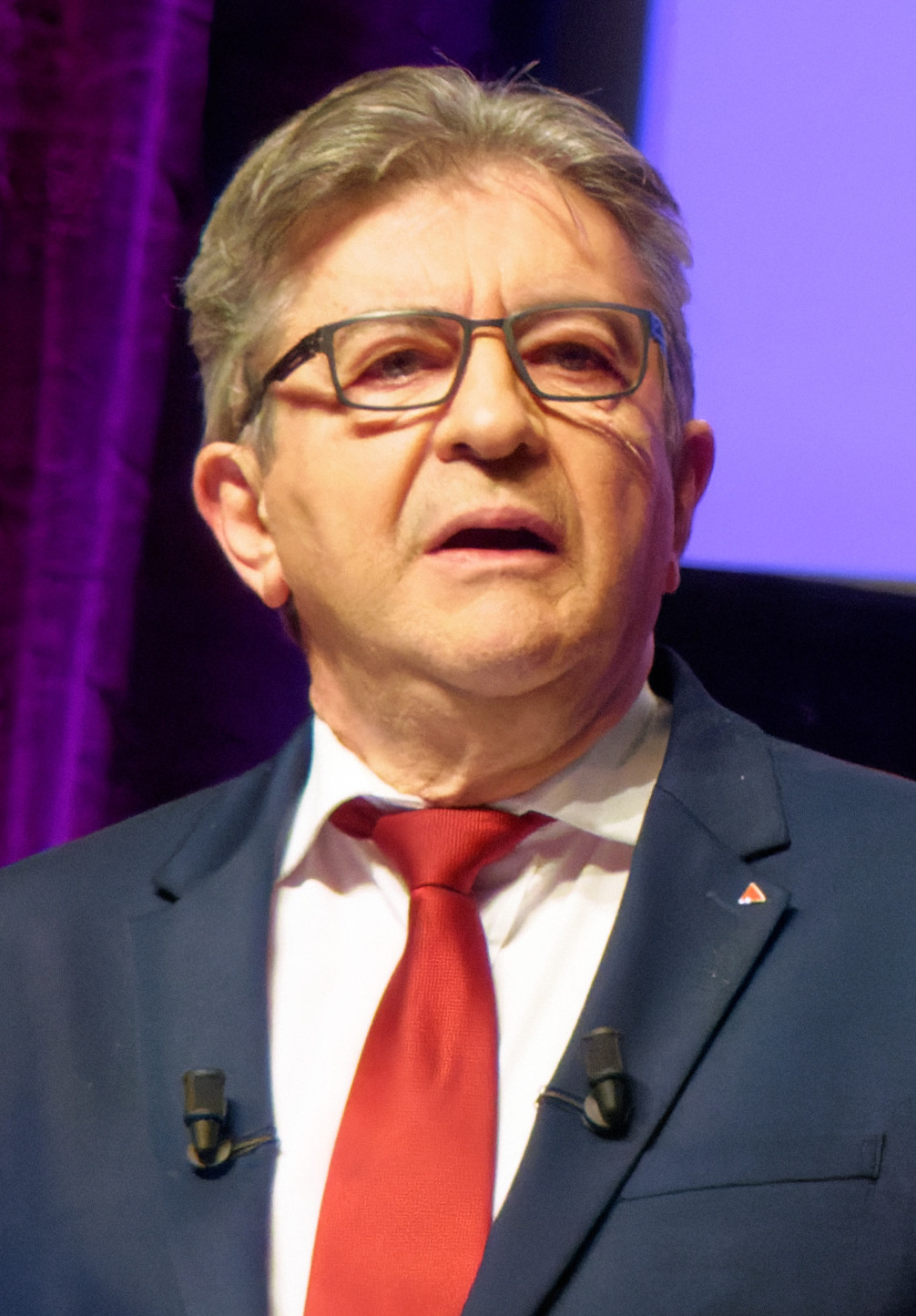

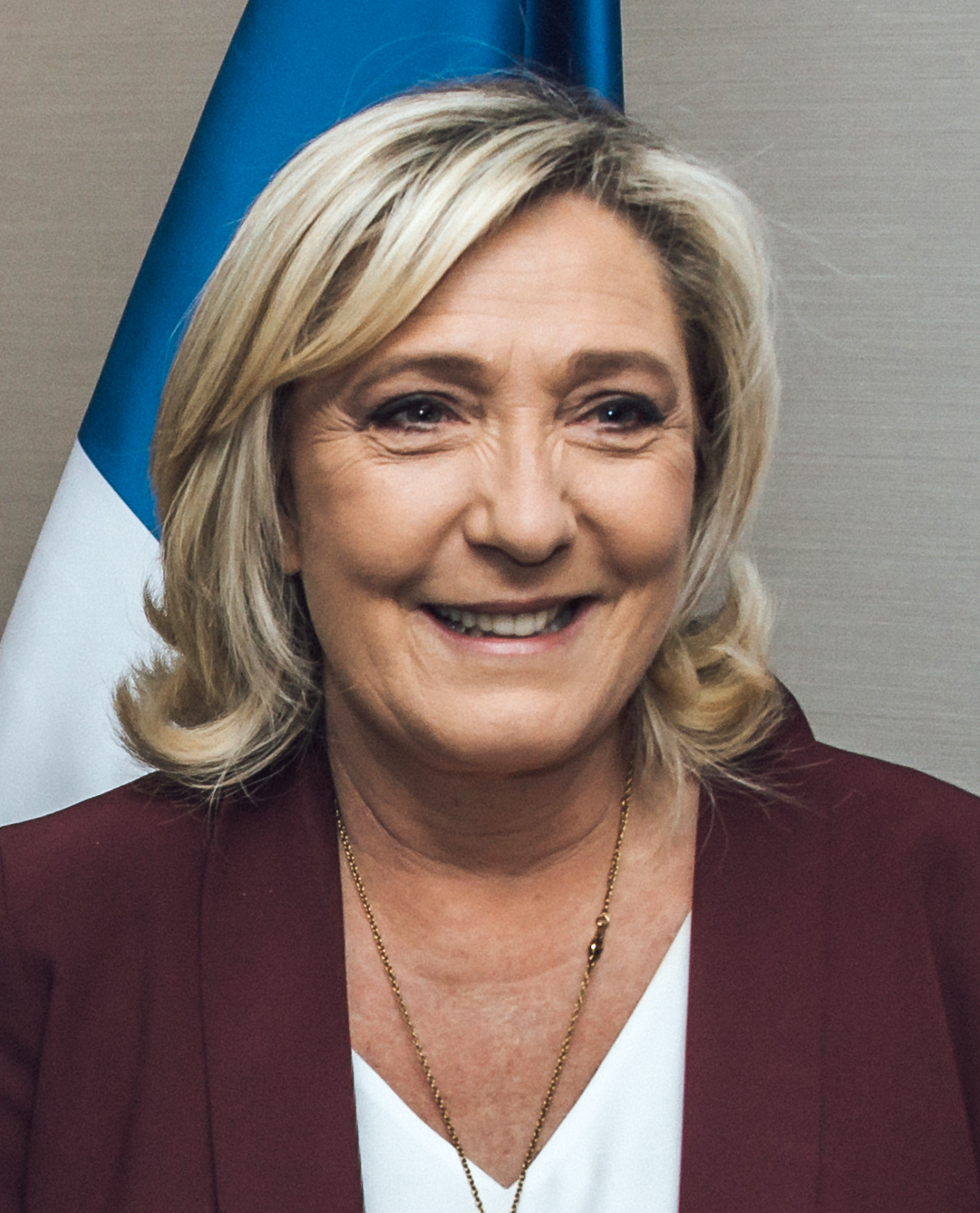

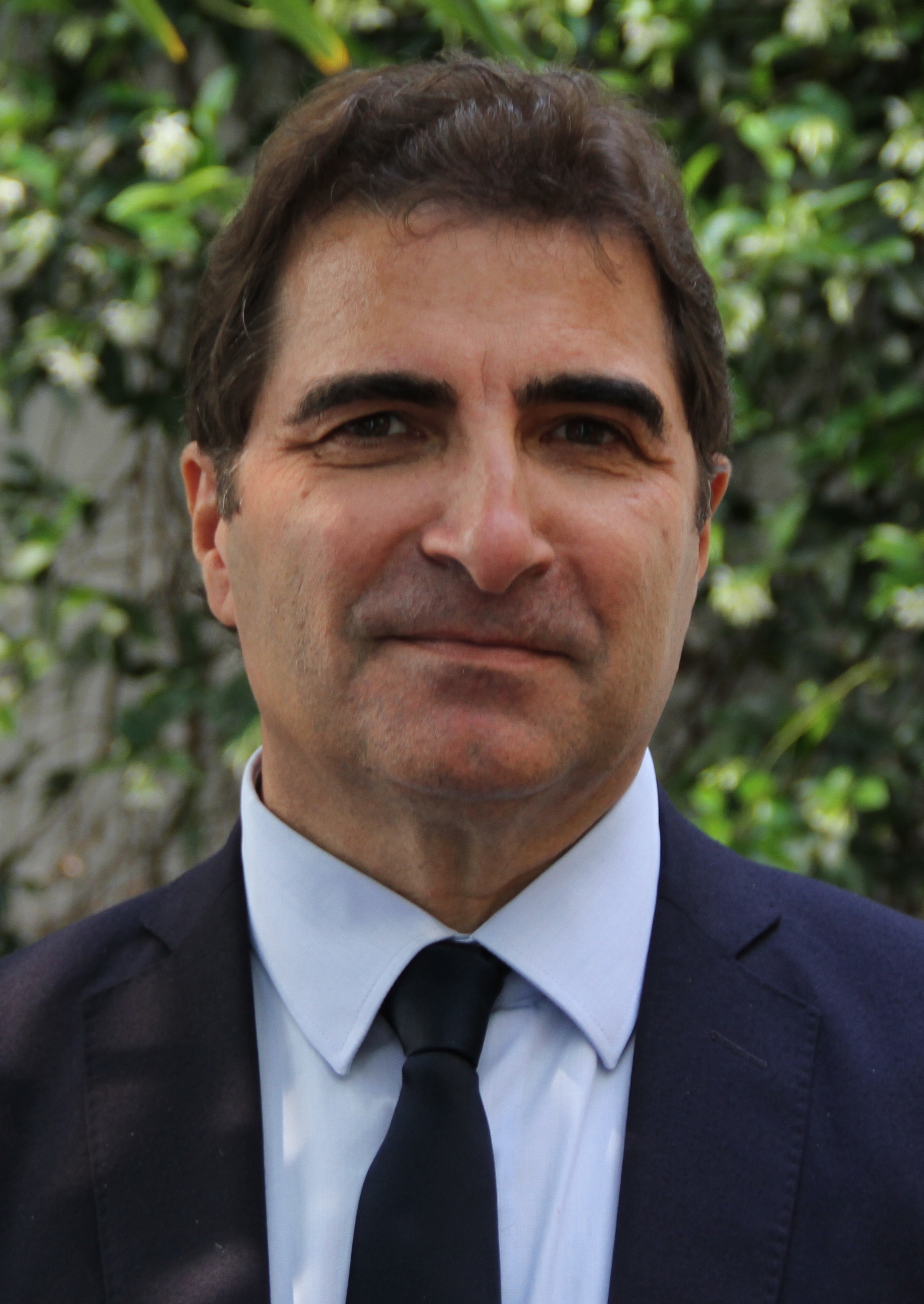
	First party	Second party
Leader	Élisabeth Borne	Jean-Luc Mélenchon
Party	LREM	LFI
Alliance	ENS	NUPES
Leader's seat	Calvados's 6th	Bouches-du-Rhône's 4th (did not stand)
Last election	New alliance	New alliance
Seats won	245 (Note: Several news outlets, such as France Info and Le Monde, give a different result as to the final seat count, with Ensemble on 247 and NUPES on 142, respectively. This is due to differences as to candidates, particularly in the French overseas constituencies, being classified as members of these alliances or not.)	131
Seat change	▼105	▲74
1st round %	5,857,364; 25.8% ▼6.5%	5,836,079; 25.7% (Note: Disputes arose as to the precise percentage of the NUPES vote in the first round, with the Ministry of the Interior claiming a total of 25.66%, while Le Monde and NUPES claim a total of 26.1%, with the discrepancy arising as a result of disputes as to which candidates are counted as members of NUPES. For the purpose of this article, the figures of the Ministry of the Interior are used.)▲1.1%
2nd round %	8,002,419; 38.6% ▼10.6%	6,556,198; 31.6% ▲19.9%
	Third party	Fourth party
Leader	Marine Le Pen	Christian Jacob
Party	RN	LR
Alliance	–	UDC
Leader's seat	Pas-de-Calais's 11th	Seine-et-Marne's 4th (did not stand)
Last election	8 seats, 13.2%	130 seats, 21.6%
Seats won	89	64
Seat change	▲81	▼66
1st round %	4,248,537; 18.7% ▲5.5%	2,568,502; 11.3% ▼7.5%
2nd round %	3,589,465; 17.3% ▲8.5%	1,512,281; 7.3% ▼18.0%
Prime Minister before election
Élisabeth Borne
LREM
Elected Prime Minister
Élisabeth Borne
LREM

Legislative elections were held in France on 12 and 19 June 2022 to elect the 577 members of the 16th National Assembly of the Fifth Republic. The elections took place following the 2022 French presidential election, which was held in April 2022. They have been described as the most indecisive legislative elections since the establishment of the five-year presidential term in 2000 and subsequent change of the electoral calendar in 2002. The governing Ensemble coalition remained the largest bloc in the National Assembly but substantially lost its ruling majority, resulting in the formation of France's first minority government since 1993; for the first time since 1997, the incumbent president of France did not have an absolute majority in Parliament. As no alliance won a majority, it resulted in a hung parliament for the first time since 1988.

The legislative elections were contested between four principal blocs: the centrist presidential majority Ensemble coalition, including Emmanuel Macron's La République En Marche!, the Democratic Movement, Horizons, as well as their allies; the left-wing New Ecological and Social People's Union (NUPES), encompassing La France Insoumise, the Socialist Party, Ecologist Pole and the French Communist Party; the centre-right Union of the Right and Centre (UDC), including The Republicans, the Union of Democrats and Independents, as well as their allies; and the far-right National Rally (RN). The NUPES alliance was formed in the two months following the presidential election, in which the left-wing vote had been fragmented; it consisted of the first French Left alliance since the Plural Left in 1997.

In the first round, there was some controversy among the Ministry of the Interior and news media about which bloc finished first, as both the NUPES and Ensemble obtained about 26% of the vote. They were followed by the RN on about 19% and UDC with about 11%. Voter turnout for the first round was a record-low 47.5%. In the second round, when turnout was higher than that of 2017, Macron's Ensemble coalition secured the most seats (245) but fell 44 seats short of an absolute majority. The NUPES was projected to win 131 (Ministry of the Interior) or 142 seats (Le Monde), while RN became the largest parliamentary opposition as a party (89). The UDC received enough seats (64 or 71) to be a kingmaker in the next government but suffered losses.

The results were perceived by political commentators as a dramatic blow for Macron, who, all at once, lost his majority in Parliament, three government ministers (Amélie de Montchalin for Ecological Transition, Brigitte Bourguignon for Health and Justine Bénin for the Sea) and three close parliamentary allies (incumbent president of the National Assembly Richard Ferrand, Macron's own former Interior minister and head of the LREM parliamentary group Christophe Castaner and MoDem parliamentary group leader Patrick Mignola), all defeated in their constituencies. The 2022 UEFA Champions League final chaos at the Stade de France on 28 May, rape accusations against newly appointed minister Damien Abad or the unusually long period between Macron's reelection as President and the formation of the new Borne government (26 days) have been cited as major factors in Macron's majority wipeout.

Macron's government, which enjoyed a 115-seat majority before the election, now fell at least 38 short of an overall majority, the largest margin for any French Cabinet since 1958. This near-unprecedented situation created potential for political instability and gridlock. Prime Minister Élisabeth Borne offered her resignation on 21 June 2022, but Macron refused to accept it. Talks among the various parties to form a stable majority government began later on 21 June but rapidly failed. On 6 July, Prime Minister Borne presented her minority government policy plan to the Parliament.

== Background ==
Following the 2017 legislative elections the incumbent president Emmanuel Macron's party, La République En Marche! (LREM), and its allies held a majority in the National Assembly (577 seats). The LREM group had 308 deputies, the Democratic Movement and affiliated democrats group had 42 deputies, and Agir ensemble, which was created in November 2017, had 9 deputies. Although a proposal to have part of the French Parliament elected with a proportional representation system was included in Macron's platform in 2017, this election promise was not fulfilled. A similar promise was made by François Hollande during the 2012 presidential election.

Macron, from the centrist LREM, had defeated Marine Le Pen, leader of the far-right National Rally, 66–34% in the 2017 French presidential election. The 2022 French presidential election was held on 10 and 24 April. As no candidate won a majority in the first round, a runoff was held, in which Macron defeated Le Pen 58–41% and was reelected as President of France. In the first round, Macron took the lead with 27.9% of votes, while Valérie Pécresse, the candidate for the Republicans, took under 5% of the vote in the first round, the worst result in the history of the party or its Gaullist predecessors. Anne Hidalgo, the mayor of Paris, received 1.75% of the vote, the worst in the history of the Socialist Party (PS). With more than 30% of the vote, it was the best result for French far-right figures since the founding of the Fifth French Republic with the 1958 French presidential election. Jean-Luc Mélenchon of La France Insoumise (LFI) came third in the first round with 21.95% of the vote and 1.2% behind second-placed Le Pen, also coming first in the 18–24 and 25–34 age groups, as well in Île-de-France, the most populous region of France.

In the context of the legislative election common participation, as the largest French Left force in the presidential election, LFI sought to unite the main left-leaning parties around the banner of the New Ecological and Social People's Union, or NUPES. Discussions were held with Europe Ecology – The Greens, including the Ecologist Pole, as well as the French Communist Party, which joined the coalition on 2–3 May 2022, respectively; the PS reached an agreement to join the coalition on 4 May, which was confirmed by a National Council party vote on 5 May. This resulted in the first wide left-wing alliance since the Plural Left in the 1997 French legislative election.

Discussion with the Federation of the Republican Left (FGR), which wanted to join NUPES, went unanswered; the FGR then formed alliances with the Radical Party of the Left, which internally rejected integration into NUPES, and the dissident minority in the PS, among the miscellaneous left. Their candidates presented themselves as part of the "secular and republican" left between Macron and Mélenchon. The New Anticapitalist Party announced it would not enter the coalition due to what they called insurmountable ideological differences with the PS, while Lutte Ouvrière announced that the party would run its own slate separate from NUPES, which they believe to be reformist.

On 5 May 2022, LREM changed its name to Renaissance, introducing its big tent coalition for the legislative election made up of the presidential majority parties called Ensemble Citoyens (Ensemble). On 16 May, Macron appointed Élisabeth Borne as Prime Minister, replacing Jean Castex. Borne, a member of Renaissance and formerly of the PS, was serving as Macron's Minister of Labour, Employment and Economic Inclusion prior to her appointment as prime minister. She is only the second woman to hold the office.

== Electoral system ==
The 577 members of the National Assembly, known as deputies, are elected for five years by a two-round system in single-member constituencies. A candidate who receives an absolute majority of valid votes and a vote total greater than 25% of the registered electorate is elected in the first round. If no candidate reaches this threshold, a runoff election is held between the top two candidates plus any other candidate who received a vote total greater than 12.5% of registered voters. The candidate who receives the most votes in the second round is elected.

== Dates ==
According to the provisions of the Electoral Code, the election must be held within the sixty days which precede the expiry of the powers of the outgoing National Assembly, attached to the third Tuesday of June, five years after its election, except in the event of dissolution of the National Assembly. The end of the mandate of the Assembly elected in 2017 is set for 21 June 2022. The dates for the legislative elections in mainland France were set for 12 and 19 June. Declarations of candidacy must be submitted no later than 20 May for the first round and 14 June for the second round. French nationals who live abroad were able to vote in the days preceding the ballot.

== Major parties and alliances ==
Below are the major parties and alliances contesting the elections, listed by their combined results in the previous elections. According to Le Journal du dimanche, the elections are mainly contested between three blocs: a left-wing bloc (NUPES), a presidential bloc on the centre-right (Ensemble), and a far-right bloc.

Party or alliance		Main ideology	Position	Leader
Ensemble	La République En Marche! and allies	Liberalism	Centre	Stanislas Guerini
Ensemble	Democratic Movement	Liberalism	Centre to centre-right	François Bayrou
Ensemble	Horizons	Liberal conservatism	Centre-right	Édouard Philippe
UDC	The Republicans and allies	Liberal conservatism	Centre-right to right-wing	Christian Jacob
UDC	Union of Democrats and Independents	Liberalism	Centre to centre-right	Jean-Christophe Lagarde
NUPES	La France Insoumise and allies	Democratic socialism	Left-wing to far-left	Adrien Quatennens
NUPES	Europe Ecology – The Greens and allies	Green politics	Centre-left to left-wing	Julien Bayou
NUPES	Socialist Party and allies	Social democracy	Centre-left	Olivier Faure
NUPES	French Communist Party	Communism	Left-wing to far-left	Fabien Roussel
National Rally and allies		Right-wing nationalism	Far-right	Jordan Bardella
Radical Party of the Left and allies		Social liberalism	Centre-left	Guillaume Lacroix
UPF	Debout la France and allies	National conservatism	Right-wing to far-right	Nicolas Dupont-Aignan
UPF	Les Patriotes	Right-wing nationalism	Right-wing to far-right	Florian Philippot
Reconquête and allies		Right-wing nationalism	Far-right	Éric Zemmour

== Opinion polls ==
Local regression of polls conducted

== Results ==
=== First round ===
After the first round, the New Ecological and Social People's Union (NUPES) and Ensemble Citoyens (Ensemble) obtained about 26%. Amid significant losses on the right-wing of the political spectrum for the Republicans (LR) and the Union of the Right and Centre (UDC), results for Emmanuel Macron's Ensemble alliance showed it was now the centre-right, having performed strongly among the traditionally centre-right electorate of UDC. The French far-right achieved mixed results; while the National Rally (RN) achieved 18% and was likely to obtain the necessary seats to form a parliamentary group, Éric Zemmour's Reconquête reached 4%, and both he and the party failed to win a seat, and former RN leader Marine Le Pen had to go through the second round for her seat due to low turnout.

In contests between NUPES and RN candidates, officials from Ensemble said they would decide on a "case-by-case basis" on whether or not to support a candidate. Élisabeth Borne, Prime Minister of France, said: "Our position is no vote for RN." At the same time, she expressed support only for NUPES candidates who in her view respect republican values. The first round confirmed that La France Insoumise (LFI) within NUPES and among the French Left, while the centre-left dissidents achieved a much lower numbers of votes like the 2022 French presidential election; of the over 70 dissident candidates, only 15 qualified for the second round.

The first round was marked by a record low turnout at 47.5%. Additionally, there was some controversy in the results between the Ministry of the Interior and French news outlets, such as France Info and Le Monde, in particular on whether NUPES or Ensemble finished first; This was due to disagreements on whether left-wing candidates should be considered within the NUPES framework or not; similar discrepancies also existed for UDC and other alliances. NUPES finished either second (per the Ministry of the Interior) or first (per Le Monde), slightly behind or ahead of Ensemble (25.75–25.66% per the Ministry of the Interior and 26.1–25.9% per Le Monde).

=== Second round ===
Constituency results after the second round by parties

The second round had a higher turnout than that in the 2017 French legislative election but did not match that of the first round a week earlier. The Ensemble alliance slightly underperformed the polls and lost their absolute majority in Parliament, while still winning the most seats. NUPES slightly underperformed relative to the polls, but still managed to substantially increase its proportion of seats and was to reported to have won 131 seats by the Ministry of the Interior.

RN substantially overperformed the polls to win an unprecedented 89 seats and become the largest parliamentary opposition group, because each component party of NUPES intended to form its own separate parliamentary grouping. RN thereby eclipsed the UDC coalition, which won enough seats to be a kingmaker in the next government but still lost seats, as expected, and was projected to win 75 seats. It was the best performance for the far right in the era of the French Fifth Republic, and their best performance since the late 19th century. Several news outlets, such as Agence France-Presse, gave a different result as to the final seat count, with Ensemble on 247, NUPES on 142, and UDC on 64, respectively, according to Le Monde. This was due to differences as to whether candidates, particularly in the French overseas constituencies, were classified as members of these alliances or not.

Differences	Final seats	
Alliance	Officially	Alternative
Party	Ministry of the Interior	Le Monde
NUPES	131	142
LFI	71	71
PS	24	24
Pôle écologiste	22	22
EELV	16	16
G.s	4	4
GE	2	2
PCF	12	12
POI / LFI	1	1
LND / DVG	1	1
DVG	22	13
PS	5	5
PRG	1	1
PPM	1	1
GUSR	1	1
PPDG	1	1
PS / DVG	1	1
DVG	2	2
PS	3	3
DVG / LFI	3	3
PLR	1	1
PLR / DVG	1	1
Péyi-A	1	1
MoDem	1	1
DIV	1	1
DIV	1	1
REG	10	6
Femu-RPS	2	2
PNC-RPS	1	1
Péyi-A	1	1
Péyi-A	1	1
MDES	1	1
DVG / REG	1	1
Tavini	3	3
ENS	245	246
LREM	110	152
TdP	52	
MoDem	48	48
Horizons	27	27
Agir		10
PRV	4	4
FP / LREM	1	1
CE / UL	1	1
GNC / UL	1	1
LREM / DVD	1	1
DVC	4	5
LREM	2	2
DVC / LREM	1	1
DVC	1	1
UDC (LR+UDI)	64	64
UDI	3	3
LR	60	60
LR / DVD	1	1
DVD	10	9
DVD	3	3
AD	1	1
LC	1	1
DVD / UDI	1	1
DVD / LR	1	1
DVD / PRV	1	1
DVD / UDI	1	1
DVD / EXD	1	1
DSV	1	0
UPF / DLF	1	1
RN	89	89
RN	89	89
EXD	0	2
Total	577	577

The elections resulted in a hung parliament, as Ensemble had only a relative majority (a plurality). It was the first hung parliament since the establishment of the five-year presidential term after the 2000 French constitutional referendum, as well as the first relative majority only since the 1988 French legislative election. The overall results were seen as a disavowal and major blow for Macron, with a risk of political instability and gridlock. Finance Minister Bruno Le Maire called the outcome a "democratic shock", and said that if the other blocs did not cooperate, "this would block our capacity to reform and protect the French". Prime Minister Borne commented: "The result is a risk for our country in view of the challenges we have to face." LR, the leading party of UDC, was thought to be the kingmaker and potentially play a role for Macron to keep his presidential majority; however, Christian Jacob, the president of LR and the leader of UDC, stated that his party would remain in opposition, meaning Macron's party would not remain in control of the legislature. Mélenchon called the results "disappointing" and said that NUPES and the French Left should form a united, single parliamentary group to avoid RN from becoming the largest opposition group in Parliament, which was refused by leaders of Europe Ecology – The Greens (EELV), French Communist Party (PCF), and Socialist Party (PS).

=== National results ===
Party	First round			Second round			Total seats	+/–
Party	Votes	%	Seats	Votes	%	Seats	Total seats	+/–
Ensemble	5,857,364	25.75	1	8,002,419	38.57	244	245	–105
New Ecological and Social People's Union	5,836,079	25.66	4	6,556,198	31.60	127	131	+74
National Rally	4,248,537	18.68	0	3,589,465	17.30	89	89	+81
Union of the Right and Centre	2,568,502	11.29	0	1,512,281	7.29	64	64	–66
Reconquête	964,775	4.24	0				0	New
Miscellaneous left (Note: Includes the Federation of the Republican Left and dissident candidates from the NUPES member parties. Some independent candidates affiliated with the NUPES were also labelled as Miscellaneous left by the Ministry of Interior. In the second round, the result of the Radical Party of the Left was included in the results for the Miscellaneous left by the Ministry.)	713,574	3.14	0	408,706	1.97	21	21	+9
Ecologists	608,314	2.67	0				0	–1
Miscellaneous right	530,782	2.33	0	231,071	1.11	10	10	+4
Regionalists	291,384	1.28	0	264,779	1.28	10	10	+5
Miscellaneous centre	283,612	1.25	0	99,145	0.48	4	4	+4
Miscellaneous far-left (Note: Includes Lutte Ouvrière and New Anticapitalist Party.)	266,412	1.17	0	11,229	0.05	0	0	0
Sovereignist right (Note: Includes the Union for France led by Debout la France and The Patriots.)	249,603	1.10	0	19,306	0.09	1	1	0
Miscellaneous	192,624	0.85	0	18,295	0.09	1	1	–2
Radical Party of the Left	126,689	0.56	0	34,576	0.17	1	1	–2
Miscellaneous far-right	6,457	0.03	0				0	–1
Total	22,744,708	100.00	5	20,747,470	100.00	572	577	0
Valid votes	22,744,708	97.80		20,747,470	92.36			
Invalid votes	149,306	0.64		480,962	2.14			
Blank votes	362,193	1.56		1,235,844	5.50			
Total votes	23,256,207	100.00		22,464,276	100.00			
Registered voters/turnout	48,953,748	47.51		48,589,360	46.23			
Source: Ministry of the Interior

Popular vote (first round)
Ensemble	25.75%
NUPES	25.66%
RN	18.68%
UDC	11.29%
REC	4.24%
DVG	3.14%
ECO	2.67%
DVD	2.33%
REG	1.28%
DVC	1.25%
DXG	1.17%
DSV	1.10%
DIV	0.85%
PRG	0.56%
DXD	0.03%

Popular vote (second round)
Ensemble	38.57%
NUPES	31.60%
RN	17.3%
UDC	7.29%
DVG	1.97%
REG	1.28%
DVD	1.11%
DVC	0.48%
PRG	0.17%
DSV	0.09%
DIV	0.09%
DXG	0.05%
REC	0.00%
ECO	0.00%
DXD	0.00%

Seats won
Ensemble	42.50%
NUPES	22.70%
RN	15.40%
UDC	11.09%
DVG	0.03%
DVD	0.02%
REG	0.02%
DVC	0.01%
PRG	0.00%
DSV	0.00%
DIV	0.00%

=== Results by constituency ===
2022 French legislative election map results by constituency

Simplified map shows which group led in each seat after the 1st round.

Simplified map shows which group won in each seat after the 2nd round.

Winning party in each constituency after the 2nd round.

Constituency		Outgoing deputy	Party	Elected deputy	Party
Ain	1st	Xavier Breton	LR	Xavier Breton	LR
Ain	2nd	Charles de la Verpillière	LR	Romain Daubié	MoDem
Ain	3rd	Olga Givernet	LREM	Olga Givernet	LREM
Ain	4th	Stéphane Trompille	LREM	Jérôme Buisson	RN
Ain	5th	Damien Abad	SE	Damien Abad	SE
Aisne	1st	Aude Bono-Vandorme	LREM	Nicolas Dragon	RN
Aisne	2nd	Julien Dive	LR	Julien Dive	LR
Aisne	3rd	Jean-Louis Bricout	SE	Jean-Louis Bricout	SE
Aisne	4th	Marc Delatte	LREM	José Beaurain	RN
Aisne	5th	Jacques Krabal	LREM	Jocelyn Dessigny	RN
Allier	1st	Jean-Paul Dufrègne	PCF	Yannick Monnet	PCF
Allier	2nd	Laurence Vanceunebrock-Mialon	LREM	Jorys Bovet	RN
Allier	3rd	Bénédicte Peyrol	LREM	Nicolas Ray	LR
Alpes-de-Haute-Provence	1st	Delphine Bagarry	LREM	Christian Girard	RN
Alpes-de-Haute-Provence	2nd	Christophe Castaner	LREM	Léo Walter	LFI
Hautes-Alpes	1st	Pascale Boyer	LREM	Pascale Boyer	LREM
Hautes-Alpes	2nd	Joël Giraud	PRG	Joël Giraud	LREM
Alpes-Maritimes	1st	Éric Ciotti	LR	Éric Ciotti	LR
Alpes-Maritimes	2nd	Loïc Dombreval	LREM	Lionel Tivoli	RN
Alpes-Maritimes	3rd	Cédric Roussel	LREM	Philippe Pradal	Horizons
Alpes-Maritimes	4th	Alexandra Valetta-Ardisson	LREM	Alexandra Masson	RN
Alpes-Maritimes	5th	Marine Brenier	LR	Christelle d'Intorni	LR
Alpes-Maritimes	6th	Laurence Trastour-Isnart	LR	Bryan Masson	RN
Alpes-Maritimes	7th	Éric Pauget	LR	Éric Pauget	LR
Alpes-Maritimes	8th	Bernard Brochand	LR	Alexandra Martin	LR
Alpes-Maritimes	9th	Michèle Tabarot	LR	Michèle Tabarot	LR
Ardèche	1st	Hervé Saulignac	PS	Hervé Saulignac	PS
Ardèche	2nd	Olivier Dussopt	PS	Olivier Dussopt	TDP
Ardèche	3rd	Fabrice Brun	LR	Fabrice Brun	LR
Ardennes	1st	Bérengère Poletti	LR	Lionel Vuibert	Agir
Ardennes	2nd	Pierre Cordier	LR	Pierre Cordier	LR
Ardennes	3rd	Jean-Luc Warsmann	UDI	Jean-Luc Warsmann	UDI
Ariège	1st	Bénédicte Taurine	LFI	Bénédicte Taurine	LFI
Ariège	2nd	Michel Larive	LFI	Laurent Panifous	PS
Aube	1st	Grégory Besson-Moreau	LREM	Jordan Guitton	RN
Aube	2nd	Valérie Bazin-Malgras	LR	Valérie Bazin-Malgras	LR
Aube	3rd	Gérard Menuel	LR	Angélique Ranc	RN
Aude	1st	Danièle Hérin	LREM	Christophe Barthès	RN
Aude	2nd	Alain Péréa	LREM	Frédéric Falcon	RN
Aude	3rd	Mireille Robert	LREM	Julien Rancoule	RN
Aveyron	1st	Stéphane Mazars	LREM	Stéphane Mazars	LREM
Aveyron	2nd	Anne Blanc	LREM	Laurent Alexandre	LFI
Aveyron	3rd	Arnaud Viala	LR	Jean-François Rousset	LREM
Bouches-du-Rhône	1st	Valérie Boyer	LR	Sabrina Agresti-Roubache	LREM
Bouches-du-Rhône	2nd	Claire Pitollat	LREM	Claire Pitollat	LREM
Bouches-du-Rhône	3rd	Alexandra Louis	LREM	Gisèle Lelouis	RN
Bouches-du-Rhône	4th	Jean-Luc Mélenchon	LFI	Manuel Bompard	LFI
Bouches-du-Rhône	5th	Cathy Racon-Bouzon	LREM	Hendrik Davi	LFI
Bouches-du-Rhône	6th	Guy Teissier	LR	Lionel Royer-Perreaut	LREM
Bouches-du-Rhône	7th	Saïd Ahamada	LREM	Sébastien Delogu	LFI
Bouches-du-Rhône	8th	Jean-Marc Zulesi	LREM	Jean-Marc Zulesi	LREM
Bouches-du-Rhône	9th	Bernard Deflesselles	LR	Joëlle Mélin	RN
Bouches-du-Rhône	10th	François-Michel Lambert	PÉ	José Gonzalez	RN
Bouches-du-Rhône	11th	Mohamed Laqhila	MoDem	Mohamed Laqhila	MoDem
Bouches-du-Rhône	12th	Éric Diard	LR	Franck Allisio	RN
Bouches-du-Rhône	13th	Pierre Dharréville	PCF	Pierre Dharréville	PCF
Bouches-du-Rhône	14th	Anne-Laurence Petel	LREM	Anne-Laurence Petel	LREM
Bouches-du-Rhône	15th	Bernard Reynès	LR	Romain Baubry	RN
Bouches-du-Rhône	16th	Monica Michel	LREM	Emmanuel Tache	RN
Calvados	1st	Fabrice Le Vigoureux	LREM	Fabrice Le Vigoureux	LREM
Calvados	2nd	Laurence Dumont	PS	Arthur Delaporte	PS
Calvados	3rd	Nathalie Porte	LR	Jérémie Patrier-Leitus	Horizons
Calvados	4th	Christophe Blanchet	LREM	Christophe Blanchet	LREM
Calvados	5th	Bertrand Bouyx	LREM	Bertrand Bouyx	LREM
Calvados	6th	Alain Tourret	LREM	Élisabeth Borne	LREM
Cantal	1st	Vincent Descœur	LR	Vincent Descœur	LR
Cantal	2nd	Jean-Yves Bony	LR	Jean-Yves Bony	LR
Charente	1st	Thomas Mesnier	LREM	Thomas Mesnier	Horizons
Charente	2nd	Sandra Marsaud	LREM	Sandra Marsaud	LREM
Charente	3rd	Jérôme Lambert	MDC	Caroline Colombier	RN
Charente-Maritime	1st	Olivier Falorni	PRG	Olivier Falorni	PRG
Charente-Maritime	2nd	Frédérique Tuffnell	MoDem	Anne-Laure Babault	LREM
Charente-Maritime	3rd	Jean-Philippe Ardouin	LREM	Jean-Philippe Ardouin	LREM
Charente-Maritime	4th	Raphaël Gérard	LREM	Raphaël Gérard	LREM
Charente-Maritime	5th	Didier Quentin	LR	Christophe Plassard	Horizons
Cher	1st	François Cormier-Bouligeon	LREM	François Cormier-Bouligeon	LREM
Cher	2nd	Nadia Essayan	MoDem	Nicolas Sansu	PCF
Cher	3rd	Loïc Kervran	LREM	Loïc Kervran	Horizons
Corrèze	1st	Christophe Jerretie	MoDem	Francis Dubois	LR
Corrèze	2nd	Frédérique Meunier	LR	Frédérique Meunier	LR
Corse-du-Sud	1st	Jean-Jacques Ferrara	LR	Laurent Marcangeli	Horizons–CCB
Corse-du-Sud	2nd	Paul-André Colombani	PNC	Paul-André Colombani	PNC
Haute-Corse	1st	Michel Castellani	Femu	Michel Castellani	Femu
Haute-Corse	2nd	Jean-Félix Acquaviva	Femu	Jean-Félix Acquaviva	Femu
Côte-d'Or	1st	Didier Martin	LREM	Didier Martin	LREM
Côte-d'Or	2nd	Rémi Delatte	LR	Benoît Bordat	FP
Côte-d'Or	3rd	Fadila Khattabi	LREM	Fadila Khattabi	LREM
Côte-d'Or	4th	Yolaine de Courson	LREM	Hubert Brigand	LR
Côte-d'Or	5th	Didier Paris	LREM	Didier Paris	LREM
Côtes-d'Armor	1st	Bruno Joncour	MoDem	Mickaël Cosson	MoDem
Côtes-d'Armor	2nd	Hervé Berville	LREM	Hervé Berville	LREM
Côtes-d'Armor	3rd	Marc Le Fur	LR	Marc Le Fur	LR
Côtes-d'Armor	4th	Yannick Kerlogot	LREM	Murielle Lepvraud	LFI
Côtes-d'Armor	5th	Éric Bothorel	LREM	Éric Bothorel	LREM
Creuse	1st	Jean-Baptiste Moreau	LREM	Catherine Couturier	LFI
Dordogne	1st	Philippe Chassaing	LREM	Pascale Martin	LFI
Dordogne	2nd	Michel Delpon	LREM	Serge Muller	RN
Dordogne	3rd	Jean-Pierre Cubertafon	MoDem	Jean-Pierre Cubertafon	MoDem
Dordogne	4th	Jacqueline Dubois	LREM	Sébastien Peytavie	G.s
Doubs	1st	Fannette Charvier	LREM	Laurent Croizier	MoDem
Doubs	2nd	Éric Alauzet	LREM	Éric Alauzet	LREM
Doubs	3rd	Denis Sommer	LREM	Nicolas Pacquot	Horizons
Doubs	4th	Frédéric Barbier	LREM	Géraldine Grangier	RN
Doubs	5th	Annie Genevard	LR	Annie Genevard	LR
Drôme	1st	Mireille Clapot	LREM	Mireille Clapot	LREM
Drôme	2nd	Alice Thourot	LREM	Lisette Pollet	RN
Drôme	3rd	Célia de Lavergne	LREM	Marie Pochon	EELV
Drôme	4th	Emmanuelle Anthoine	LR	Emmanuelle Anthoine	LR
Eure	1st	Bruno Le Maire	LREM	Christine Loir	RN
Eure	2nd	Fabien Gouttefarde	LREM	Katiana Levavasseur	RN
Eure	3rd	Marie Tamarelle-Verhaeghe	LREM	Kévin Mauvieux	RN
Eure	4th	Bruno Questel	LREM	Philippe Brun	PS
Eure	5th	Claire O'Petit	LREM	Timothée Houssin	RN
Eure-et-Loir	1st	Guillaume Kasbarian	LREM	Guillaume Kasbarian	LREM
Eure-et-Loir	2nd	Olivier Marleix	LR	Olivier Marleix	LR
Eure-et-Loir	3rd	Laure de La Raudière	LR	Luc Lamirault	Horizons
Eure-et-Loir	4th	Philippe Vigier	MoDem	Philippe Vigier	MoDem
Finistère	1st	Annaïg Le Meur	LREM	Annaïg Le Meur	LREM
Finistère	2nd	Jean-Charles Larsonneur	LREM	Jean-Charles Larsonneur	LREM
Finistère	3rd	Didier Le Gac	LREM	Didier Le Gac	LREM
Finistère	4th	Sandrine Le Feur	LREM	Sandrine Le Feur	LREM
Finistère	5th	Graziella Melchior	LREM	Graziella Melchior	LREM
Finistère	6th	Richard Ferrand	LREM	Mélanie Thomin	PS
Finistère	7th	Liliane Tanguy	LREM	Liliane Tanguy	LREM
Finistère	8th	Erwan Balanant	MoDem	Erwan Balanant	MoDem
Gard	1st	Françoise Dumas	LREM	Yoann Gillet	RN
Gard	2nd	Nicolas Meizonnet	RN	Nicolas Meizonnet	RN
Gard	3rd	Anthony Cellier	LREM	Pascale Bordes	RN
Gard	4th	Annie Chapelier	LREM	Pierre Maurin	RN
Gard	5th	Catherine Daufès-Roux	LREM	Michel Sala	LFI
Gard	6th	Philippe Berta	MoDem	Philippe Berta	MoDem
Haute-Garonne	1st	Pierre Cabaré	LREM	Hadrien Clouet	LFI
Haute-Garonne	2nd	Jean-Luc Lagleize	MoDem	Anne Stambach-Terrenoir	LFI
Haute-Garonne	3rd	Corinne Vignon	LREM	Corinne Vignon	LREM
Haute-Garonne	4th	Mickaël Nogal	LREM	François Piquemal	LFI
Haute-Garonne	5th	Jean-François Portarrieu	LREM	Jean-François Portarrieu	LREM
Haute-Garonne	6th	Monique Iborra	LREM	Monique Iborra	LREM
Haute-Garonne	7th	Élisabeth Toutut-Picard	LREM	Christophe Bex	LFI
Haute-Garonne	8th	Joël Aviragnet	PS	Joël Aviragnet	PS
Haute-Garonne	9th	Sandrine Mörch	LREM	Christine Arrighi	EELV
Haute-Garonne	10th	Sébastien Nadot	LREM	Dominique Faure	PRV
Gers	1st	Jean-René Cazeneuve	LREM	Jean-René Cazeneuve	LREM
Gers	2nd	Gisèle Biémouret	PS	David Taupiac	PS
Gironde	1st	Dominique David	LREM	Thomas Cazenave	LREM
Gironde	2nd	Catherine Fabre	LREM	Nicolas Thierry	EELV
Gironde	3rd	Loïc Prud'homme	LFI	Loïc Prud'homme	LFI
Gironde	4th	Alain David	PS	Alain David	PS
Gironde	5th	Benoît Simian	LREM	Grégoire de Fournas	RN
Gironde	6th	Eric Poulliat	LREM	Eric Poulliat	LREM
Gironde	7th	Bérangère Couillard	LREM	Bérangère Couillard	LREM
Gironde	8th	Sophie Panonacle	LREM	Sophie Panonacle	LREM
Gironde	9th	Sophie Mette	MoDem	Sophie Mette	MoDem
Gironde	10th	Florent Boudié	LREM	Florent Boudié	LREM
Gironde	11th	Véronique Hammerer	LREM	Edwige Diaz	RN
Gironde	12th	Christelle Dubos	LREM	Pascal Lavergne	LREM
Hérault	1st	Patricia Mirallès	LREM	Patricia Mirallès	TDP
Hérault	2nd	Muriel Ressiguier	LFI	Nathalie Oziol	LFI
Hérault	3rd	Coralie Dubost	LREM	Laurence Cristol	LREM
Hérault	4th	Jean-François Eliaou	LREM	Sébastien Rome	LFI
Hérault	5th	Philippe Huppé	LREM	Stéphanie Galzy	RN
Hérault	6th	Emmanuelle Ménard	SE	Emmanuelle Ménard	SE
Hérault	7th	Christophe Euzet	LREM	Aurélien Lopez-Liguori	RN
Hérault	8th	Nicolas Démoulin	LREM	Sylvain Carrière	LFI
Hérault	9th	Patrick Vignal	LREM	Patrick Vignal	LREM
Ille-et-Vilaine	1st	Mostapha Laabid	LREM	Frédéric Mathieu	LFI
Ille-et-Vilaine	2nd	Laurence Maillart-Méhaignerie	LREM	Laurence Maillart-Méhaignerie	LREM
Ille-et-Vilaine	3rd	Claudia Rouaux	PS	Claudia Rouaux	PS
Ille-et-Vilaine	4th	Gaël Le Bohec	LREM	Mathilde Hignet	LFI
Ille-et-Vilaine	5th	Christine Cloarec	LREM	Christine Cloarec	LREM
Ille-et-Vilaine	6th	Thierry Benoit	UDI	Thierry Benoit	Horizons
Ille-et-Vilaine	7th	Jean-Luc Bourgeaux	LR	Jean-Luc Bourgeaux	LR
Ille-et-Vilaine	8th	Florian Bachelier	LREM	Mickaël Bouloux	PS
Indre	1st	François Jolivet	LREM	François Jolivet	Horizons
Indre	2nd	Nicolas Forissier	LR	Nicolas Forissier	LR
Indre-et-Loire	1st	Philippe Chalumeau	LREM	Charles Fournier	EELV
Indre-et-Loire	2nd	Daniel Labaronne	LREM	Daniel Labaronne	LREM
Indre-et-Loire	3rd	Sophie Métadier	UDI	Henri Alfandari	Horizons
Indre-et-Loire	4th	Fabienne Colboc	LREM	Fabienne Colboc	LREM
Indre-et-Loire	5th	Sabine Thillaye	MoDem	Sabine Thillaye	MoDem
Isère	1st	Olivier Véran	LREM	Olivier Véran	LREM
Isère	2nd	Jean-Charles Colas-Roy	LREM	Cyrielle Chatelain	EELV
Isère	3rd	Émilie Chalas	LREM	Élisa Martin	LFI
Isère	4th	Marie-Noëlle Battistel	PS	Marie-Noëlle Battistel	PS
Isère	5th	Catherine Kamowski	LREM	Jérémie Iordanoff	EELV
Isère	6th	Cendra Motin	LREM	Alexis Jolly	RN
Isère	7th	Monique Limon	LREM	Yannick Neuder	LR
Isère	8th	Caroline Abadie	LREM	Caroline Abadie	LREM
Isère	9th	Élodie Jacquier-Laforge	MoDem	Élodie Jacquier-Laforge	MoDem
Isère	10th	Marjolaine Meynier-Millefert	LREM	Marjolaine Meynier-Millefert	LREM
Jura	1st	Danielle Brulebois	LREM	Danielle Brulebois	LREM
Jura	2nd	Marie-Christine Dalloz	LR	Marie-Christine Dalloz	LR
Jura	3rd	Jean-Marie Sermier	LR	Justine Gruet	LR
Landes	1st	Fabien Lainé	MoDem	Geneviève Darrieussecq	MoDem
Landes	2nd	Lionel Causse	LREM	Lionel Causse	LREM
Landes	3rd	Boris Vallaud	PS	Boris Vallaud	PS
Loir-et-Cher	1st	Marc Fesneau	MoDem	Marc Fesneau	MoDem
Loir-et-Cher	2nd	Guillaume Peltier	LR	Roger Chudeau	RN
Loir-et-Cher	3rd	Pascal Brindeau	UDI	Christophe Marion	LREM
Loire	1st	Régis Juanico	G.s	Quentin Bataillon	LREM
Loire	2nd	Jean-Michel Mis	LREM	Andrée Taurinya	LFI
Loire	3rd	Valéria Faure-Muntian	LREM	Emmanuel Mandon	MoDem
Loire	4th	Dino Cinieri	LR	Dino Cinieri	LR
Loire	5th	Nathalie Sarles	LREM	Antoine Vermorel-Marques	LR
Loire	6th	Julien Borowczyk	LREM	Jean-Pierre Taite	LR
Haute-Loire	1st	Isabelle Valentin	LR	Isabelle Valentin	LR
Haute-Loire	2nd	Jean-Pierre Vigier	LR	Jean-Pierre Vigier	LR
Loire-Atlantique	1st	François de Rugy	LREM	Mounir Belhamiti	LREM
Loire-Atlantique	2nd	Valérie Oppelt	LREM	Andy Kerbrat	LFI
Loire-Atlantique	3rd	Anne-France Brunet	LREM	Ségolène Amiot	LFI
Loire-Atlantique	4th	Aude Amadou	LREM	Julie Laernoes	EELV
Loire-Atlantique	5th	Luc Geismar	MoDem	Sarah El Haïry	MoDem
Loire-Atlantique	6th	Yves Daniel	LREM	Jean-Claude Raux	EELV
Loire-Atlantique	7th	Sandrine Josso	MoDem	Sandrine Josso	MoDem
Loire-Atlantique	8th	Audrey Dufeu-Schubert	LREM	Matthias Tavel	LFI
Loire-Atlantique	9th	Yannick Haury	MoDem	Yannick Haury	MoDem
Loire-Atlantique	10th	Sophie Errante	LREM	Sophie Errante	LREM
Loiret	1st	Stéphanie Rist	LREM	Stéphanie Rist	LREM
Loiret	2nd	Caroline Janvier	LREM	Caroline Janvier	LREM
Loiret	3rd	Claude de Ganay	LR	Mathilde Paris	RN
Loiret	4th	Jean-Pierre Door	LR	Thomas Ménagé	RN
Loiret	5th	Marianne Dubois	LR	Anthony Brosse	LREM
Loiret	6th	Richard Ramos	MoDem	Richard Ramos	MoDem
Lot	1st	Aurélien Pradié	LR	Aurélien Pradié	LR
Lot	2nd	Huguette Tiegna	LREM	Huguette Tiegna	LREM
Lot-et-Garonne	1st	Michel Lauzzana	LREM	Michel Lauzzana	LREM
Lot-et-Garonne	2nd	Alexandre Freschi	LREM	Hélène Laporte	RN
Lot-et-Garonne	3rd	Olivier Damaisin	LREM	Annick Cousin	RN
Lozère	1st	Pierre Morel-À-L'Huissier	UDI	Pierre Morel-À-L'Huissier	UDI
Maine-et-Loire	1st	Matthieu Orphelin	LREM	François Gernigon	Horizons
Maine-et-Loire	2nd	Stella Dupont	LREM	Stella Dupont	LREM
Maine-et-Loire	3rd	Anne-Laure Blin	LR	Anne-Laure Blin	LR
Maine-et-Loire	4th	Laetitia Saint-Paul	LREM	Laetitia Saint-Paul	LREM
Maine-et-Loire	5th	Denis Masséglia	LREM	Denis Masséglia	LREM
Maine-et-Loire	6th	Nicole Dubré-Chirat	LREM	Nicole Dubré-Chirat	LREM
Maine-et-Loire	7th	Philippe Bolo	MoDem	Philippe Bolo	MoDem
Manche	1st	Philippe Gosselin	LR	Philippe Gosselin	LR
Manche	2nd	Bertrand Sorre	LREM	Bertrand Sorre	LREM
Manche	3rd	Stéphane Travert	LREM	Stéphane Travert	LREM
Manche	4th	Sonia Krimi	LREM	Anna Pic	PS
Marne	1st	Valérie Beauvais	LR	Xavier Albertini	Horizons
Marne	2nd	Aina Kuric	LREM	Anne-Sophie Frigout	RN
Marne	3rd	Éric Girardin	LREM	Éric Girardin	LREM
Marne	4th	Lise Magnier	LR	Lise Magnier	Horizons
Marne	5th	Charles de Courson	LC	Charles de Courson	LC
Haute-Marne	1st	Sylvain Templier	LREM	Christophe Bentz	RN
Haute-Marne	2nd	François Cornut-Gentille	LR	Laurence Robert-Dehault	RN
Mayenne	1st	Guillaume Garot	PS	Guillaume Garot	PS
Mayenne	2nd	Géraldine Bannier	MoDem	Géraldine Bannier	MoDem
Mayenne	3rd	Yannick Favennec Becot	LR	Yannick Favennec Becot	Horizons
Meurthe-et-Moselle	1st	Carole Grandjean	LREM	Carole Grandjean	LREM
Meurthe-et-Moselle	2nd	Pascale César	MoDem	Emmanuel Lacresse	LREM
Meurthe-et-Moselle	3rd	Xavier Paluszkiewicz	LREM	Martine Étienne	LFI
Meurthe-et-Moselle	4th	Thibault Bazin	LR	Thibault Bazin	LR
Meurthe-et-Moselle	5th	Dominique Potier	PS	Dominique Potier	PS
Meurthe-et-Moselle	6th	Caroline Fiat	LFI	Caroline Fiat	LFI
Meuse	1st	Bertrand Pancher	SE	Bertrand Pancher	SE
Meuse	2nd	Émilie Cariou	LREM	Florence Goulet	RN
Morbihan	1st	Hervé Pellois	LREM	Anne Le Hénanff	Horizons
Morbihan	2nd	Jimmy Pahun	MoDem	Jimmy Pahun	MoDem
Morbihan	3rd	Nicole Le Peih	LREM	Nicole Le Peih	LREM
Morbihan	4th	Paul Molac	SE	Paul Molac	SE
Morbihan	5th	Gwendal Rouillard	LREM	Lysiane Metayer	LREM
Morbihan	6th	Jean-Michel Jacques	LREM	Jean-Michel Jacques	LREM
Moselle	1st	Belkhir Belhaddad	LREM	Belkhir Belhaddad	LREM
Moselle	2nd	Ludovic Mendes	LREM	Ludovic Mendes	LREM
Moselle	3rd	Richard Lioger	LREM	Charlotte Leduc	LFI
Moselle	4th	Fabien Di Filippo	LR	Fabien Di Filippo	LR
Moselle	5th	Nicole Gries-Trisse	LREM	Vincent Seitlinger	LR
Moselle	6th	Christophe Arend	LREM	Kévin Pfeffer	RN
Moselle	7th	Hélène Zannier	LREM	Alexandre Loubet	RN
Moselle	8th	Brahim Hammouche	MoDem	Laurent Jacobelli	RN
Moselle	9th	Isabelle Rauch	LREM	Isabelle Rauch	Horizons
Nièvre	1st	Perrine Goulet	LREM	Perrine Goulet	LREM
Nièvre	2nd	Patrice Perrot	LREM	Patrice Perrot	LREM
Nord	1st	Adrien Quatennens	LFI	Adrien Quatennens	LFI
Nord	2nd	Ugo Bernalicis	LFI	Ugo Bernalicis	LFI
Nord	3rd	Christophe Di Pompeo	LREM	Benjamin Saint-Huile	SE
Nord	4th	Brigitte Liso	LREM	Brigitte Liso	LREM
Nord	5th	Sébastien Huyghe	LR	Victor Catteau	RN
Nord	6th	Charlotte Lecocq	LREM	Charlotte Lecocq	LREM
Nord	7th	Valérie Six	UDI	Félicie Gérard	Horizons
Nord	8th	Catherine Osson	LREM	David Guiraud	LFI
Nord	9th	Valérie Petit	LREM	Violette Spillebout	LREM
Nord	10th	Vincent Ledoux	LR	Gérald Darmanin	LREM
Nord	11th	Florence Morlighem	LREM	Roger Vicot	PS
Nord	12th	Anne-Laure Cattelot	LREM	Michaël Taverne	RN
Nord	13th	Christian Hutin	MDC	Christine Decodts	LREM
Nord	14th	Paul Christophe	LR	Paul Christophe	Agir
Nord	15th	Jennifer de Temmerman	LREM	Pierrick Berteloot	RN
Nord	16th	Alain Bruneel	PCF	Matthieu Marchio	RN
Nord	17th	Dimitri Houbron	LREM	Thibaut François	RN
Nord	18th	Guy Bricout	UDI	Guy Bricout	UDI
Nord	19th	Sébastien Chenu	RN	Sébastien Chenu	RN
Nord	20th	Fabien Roussel	PCF	Fabien Roussel	PCF
Nord	21st	Béatrice Descamps	UDI	Béatrice Descamps	UDI
Oise	1st	Olivier Dassault	LR	Victor Habert-Dassault	LR
Oise	2nd	Agnès Thill	UDI	Philippe Ballard	RN
Oise	3rd	Pascal Bois	LREM	Alexandre Sabatou	RN
Oise	4th	Éric Woerth	LR	Éric Woerth	LREM
Oise	5th	Pierre Vatin	LR	Pierre Vatin	LR
Oise	6th	Carole Bureau-Bonnard	LREM	Michel Guiniot	RN
Oise	7th	Maxime Minot	LR	Maxime Minot	LR
Orne	1st	Chantal Jourdan	PS	Chantal Jourdan	PS
Orne	2nd	Véronique Louwagie	LR	Véronique Louwagie	LR
Orne	3rd	Jérôme Nury	LR	Jérôme Nury	LR
Pas-de-Calais	1st	Bruno Duvergé	MoDem	Emmanuel Blairy	RN
Pas-de-Calais	2nd	Jacqueline Maquet	LREM	Jacqueline Maquet	LREM
Pas-de-Calais	3rd	Emmanuel Blairy	RN	Jean-Marc Tellier	PCF
Pas-de-Calais	4th	Robert Therry	LR	Philippe Fait	Horizons
Pas-de-Calais	5th	Jean-Pierre Pont	LREM	Jean-Pierre Pont	LREM
Pas-de-Calais	6th	Christophe Leclercq	LREM	Christine Engrand	RN
Pas-de-Calais	7th	Pierre-Henri Dumont	LR	Pierre-Henri Dumont	LR
Pas-de-Calais	8th	Benoît Potterie	LREM	Bertrand Petit	PS
Pas-de-Calais	9th	Marguerite Deprez-Audebert	MoDem	Caroline Parmentier	RN
Pas-de-Calais	10th	Ludovic Pajot	RN	Thierry Frappé	RN
Pas-de-Calais	11th	Marine Le Pen	RN	Marine Le Pen	RN
Pas-de-Calais	12th	Bruno Bilde	RN	Bruno Bilde	RN
Puy-de-Dôme	1st	Valérie Thomas	LREM	Marianne Maximi	LFI
Puy-de-Dôme	2nd	Christine Pirès-Beaune	PS	Christine Pirès-Beaune	PS
Puy-de-Dôme	3rd	Laurence Vichnievsky	MoDem	Laurence Vichnievsky	MoDem
Puy-de-Dôme	4th	Michel Fanget	MoDem	Delphine Lingemann	MoDem
Puy-de-Dôme	5th	André Chassaigne	PCF	André Chassaigne	PCF
Pyrénées-Atlantiques	1st	Josy Poueyto	MoDem	Josy Poueyto	MoDem
Pyrénées-Atlantiques	2nd	Jean-Paul Mattei	MoDem	Jean-Paul Mattei	MoDem
Pyrénées-Atlantiques	3rd	David Habib	PS	David Habib	PS
Pyrénées-Atlantiques	4th	Jean Lassalle	RÉS	Iñaki Echaniz	PS
Pyrénées-Atlantiques	5th	Florence Lasserre-David	MoDem	Florence Lasserre-David	MoDem
Pyrénées-Atlantiques	6th	Vincent Bru	MoDem	Vincent Bru	MoDem
Hautes-Pyrénées	1st	Jean-Bernard Sempastous	LREM	Sylvie Ferrer	LFI
Hautes-Pyrénées	2nd	Jeanine Dubié	PRG	Benoît Mournet	LREM
Pyrénées-Orientales	1st	Romain Grau	LREM	Sophie Blanc	RN
Pyrénées-Orientales	2nd	Catherine Pujol	RN	Anaïs Sabatini	RN
Pyrénées-Orientales	3rd	Laurence Gayte	LREM	Sandrine Dogor-Such	RN
Pyrénées-Orientales	4th	Sébastien Cazenove	LREM	Michèle Martinez	RN
Bas-Rhin	1st	Thierry Michels	LREM	Sandra Regol	EELV
Bas-Rhin	2nd	Sylvain Waserman	MoDem	Emmanuel Fernandes	LFI
Bas-Rhin	3rd	Bruno Studer	LREM	Bruno Studer	LREM
Bas-Rhin	4th	Martine Wonner	LREM	Françoise Buffet	LREM
Bas-Rhin	5th	Antoine Herth	LR	Charles Sitzenstuhl	LREM
Bas-Rhin	6th	Philippe Meyer	LR	Louise Morel	LREM
Bas-Rhin	7th	Patrick Hetzel	LR	Patrick Hetzel	LR
Bas-Rhin	8th	Frédéric Reiss	LR	Stéphanie Kochert	Horizons
Bas-Rhin	9th	Vincent Thiébaut	LREM	Vincent Thiébaut	Horizons
Haut-Rhin	1st	Yves Hemedinger	LR	Brigitte Klinkert	LREM
Haut-Rhin	2nd	Jacques Cattin	LR	Hubert Ott	MoDem
Haut-Rhin	3rd	Jean-Luc Reitzer	LR	Dieier Lemaire	Horizons
Haut-Rhin	4th	Raphaël Schellenberger	LR	Raphaël Schellenberger	LR
Haut-Rhin	5th	Olivier Becht	Agir	Olivier Becht	Agir
Haut-Rhin	6th	Bruno Fuchs	MoDem	Bruno Fuchs	MoDem
Rhône	1st	Thomas Rudigoz	LREM	Thomas Rudigoz	LREM
Rhône	2nd	Hubert Julien-Laferrière	LREM	Hubert Julien-Laferrière	GE
Rhône	3rd	Jean-Louis Touraine	LREM	Marie-Charlotte Garin	EELV
Rhône	4th	Anne Brugnera	LREM	Anne Brugnera	LREM
Rhône	5th	Blandine Brocard	LREM	Blandine Brocard	LREM
Rhône	6th	Bruno Bonnell	LREM	Gabriel Amard	LFI
Rhône	7th	Anissa Khedher	LREM	Alexandre Vincendet	LR
Rhône	8th	Nathalie Serre	LR	Nathalie Serre	LR
Rhône	9th	Bernard Perrut	LR	Alexandre Portier	LR
Rhône	10th	Thomas Gassilloud	LREM	Thomas Gassilloud	Agir
Rhône	11th	Jean-Luc Fugit	LREM	Jean-Luc Fugit	LREM
Rhône	12th	Cyrille Isaac-Sibille	MoDem	Cyrille Isaac-Sibille	MoDem
Rhône	13th	Danièle Cazarian	LREM	Sarah Tanzilli	LREM
Rhône	14th	Yves Blein	LREM	Idir Boumertit	LFI
Haute-Saône	1st	Barbara Bessot Ballot	LREM	Antoine Villedieu	RN
Haute-Saône	2nd	Christophe Lejeune	LREM	Emeric Salmon	RN
Saône-et-Loire	1st	Benjamin Dirx	LREM	Benjamin Dirx	LREM
Saône-et-Loire	2nd	Josiane Corneloup	LR	Josiane Corneloup	LR
Saône-et-Loire	3rd	Rémy Rebeyrotte	LREM	Rémy Rebeyrotte	LREM
Saône-et-Loire	4th	Cécile Untermaier	PS	Cécile Untermaier	PS
Saône-et-Loire	5th	Raphaël Gauvain	LREM	Louis Margueritte	LREM
Sarthe	1st	Damien Pichereau	LREM	Julie Delpech	LREM
Sarthe	2nd	Marietta Karamanli	PS	Marietta Karamanli	PS
Sarthe	3rd	Pascale Fontenel-Personne	MoDem	Éric Martineau	MoDem
Sarthe	4th	Sylvie Tolmont	PS	Élise Leboucher	LFI
Sarthe	5th	Jean-Carles Grelier	LREM	Jean-Carles Grelier	LREM
Savoie	1st	Typhanie Degois	LREM	Marina Ferrari	MoDem
Savoie	2nd	Vincent Rolland	LR	Vincent Rolland	LR
Savoie	3rd	Émilie Bonnivard	LR	Émilie Bonnivard	LR
Savoie	4th	Patrick Mignola	MoDem	Jean-François Coulomme	LFI
Haute-Savoie	1st	Véronique Riotton	LREM	Véronique Riotton	LREM
Haute-Savoie	2nd	Jacques Rey	LREM	Antoine Armand	LREM
Haute-Savoie	3rd	Christelle Petex-Levet	LR	Christelle Petex-Levet	LR
Haute-Savoie	4th	Virginie Duby-Muller	LR	Virginie Duby-Muller	LR
Haute-Savoie	5th	Marion Lenne	LREM	Anne-Cécile Violland	Horizons
Haute-Savoie	6th	Xavier Roseren	LREM	Xavier Roseren	LREM
Paris	1st	Sylvain Maillard	LREM	Sylvain Maillard	LREM
Paris	2nd	Gilles Le Gendre	LREM	Gilles Le Gendre	LREM
Paris	3rd	Stanislas Guerini	LREM	Stanislas Guerini	LREM
Paris	4th	Brigitte Kuster	LR	Astrid Panosyan-Bouvet	LREM
Paris	5th	Benjamin Griveaux	LREM	Julien Bayou	EELV
Paris	6th	Pierre Person	LREM	Sophia Chikirou	LFI
Paris	7th	Pacôme Rupin	LREM	Clément Beaune	LREM
Paris	8th	Laetitia Avia	LREM	Éva Sas	EELV
Paris	9th	Buon Tan	LREM	Sandrine Rousseau	EELV
Paris	10th	Anne-Christine Lang	LREM	Rodrigo Arenas	LFI
Paris	11th	Marielle de Sarnez	MoDem	Maud Gatel	MoDem
Paris	12th	Olivia Grégoire	LREM	Olivia Grégoire	LREM
Paris	13th	Hugues Renson	LREM	David Amiel	LREM
Paris	14th	Claude Goasguen	LR	Benjamin Haddad	LREM
Paris	15th	George Pau-Langevin	PS	Danielle Simonnet	LFI
Paris	16th	Mounir Mahjoubi	LREM	Sarah Legrain	LFI
Paris	17th	Danièle Obono	LFI	Danièle Obono	LFI
Paris	18th	Pierre-Yves Bournazel	LR	Aymeric Caron	REV
Seine-Maritime	1st	Damien Adam	LREM	Damien Adam	LREM
Seine-Maritime	2nd	Annie Vidal	LREM	Annie Vidal	LREM
Seine-Maritime	3rd	Hubert Wulfranc	PCF	Hubert Wulfranc	PCF
Seine-Maritime	4th	Sira Sylla	LREM	Alma Dufour	LFI
Seine-Maritime	5th	Gérard Leseul	PS	Gérard Leseul	PS
Seine-Maritime	6th	Sébastien Jumel	PCF	Sébastien Jumel	PCF
Seine-Maritime	7th	Agnès Firmin-Le Bodo	LR	Agnès Firmin-Le Bodo	Horizons
Seine-Maritime	8th	Jean-Paul Lecoq	PCF	Jean-Paul Lecoq	PCF
Seine-Maritime	9th	Stéphanie Kerbarh	PRG	Marie-Agnès Poussier-Winsback	Horizons
Seine-Maritime	10th	Xavier Batut	LREM	Xavier Batut	LREM
Seine-et-Marne	1st	Aude Luquet	MoDem	Aude Luquet	MoDem
Seine-et-Marne	2nd	Valérie Lacroute	LR	Frédéric Valletoux	Horizons
Seine-et-Marne	3rd	Yves Jégo	UDI	Jean-Louis Thiériot	LR
Seine-et-Marne	4th	Christian Jacob	LR	Isabelle Périgault	LR
Seine-et-Marne	5th	Franck Riester	LR	Franck Riester	Agir
Seine-et-Marne	6th	Jean-François Parigi	LR	Béatrice Roullaud	RN
Seine-et-Marne	7th	Rodrigue Kokouendo	LREM	Ersilia Soudais	LFI
Seine-et-Marne	8th	Jean-Michel Fauvergue	LREM	Hadrien Ghomi	LREM
Seine-et-Marne	9th	Michèle Peyron	LREM	Michèle Peyron	LREM
Seine-et-Marne	10th	Stéphanie Do	LREM	Maxime Laisney	LFI
Seine-et-Marne	11th	Olivier Faure	PS	Olivier Faure	PS
Yvelines	1st	Didier Baichère	LREM	Charles Rodwell	LREM
Yvelines	2nd	Jean-Noël Barrot	MoDem	Jean-Noël Barrot	MoDem
Yvelines	3rd	Béatrice Piron	LREM	Béatrice Piron	LREM
Yvelines	4th	Marie Lebec	LREM	Marie Lebec	LREM
Yvelines	5th	Yaël Braun-Pivet	LREM	Yaël Braun-Pivet	LREM
Yvelines	6th	Natalia Pouzyreff	LREM	Natalia Pouzyreff	LREM
Yvelines	7th	Michèle de Vaucouleurs	MoDem	Nadia Hai	LREM
Yvelines	8th	Michel Vialay	LR	Benjamin Lucas	G.s
Yvelines	9th	Bruno Millienne	MoDem	Bruno Millienne	MoDem
Yvelines	10th	Aurore Bergé	LREM	Aurore Bergé	LREM
Yvelines	11th	Nadia Hai	LREM	William Martinet	LFI
Yvelines	12th	Florence Granjus	LREM	Karl Olive	LREM
Deux-Sèvres	1st	Guillaume Chiche	LREM	Bastien Marchive	Horizons
Deux-Sèvres	2nd	Delphine Batho	PS	Delphine Batho	GE
Deux-Sèvres	3rd	Jean-Marie Fiévet	LREM	Jean-Marie Fiévet	LREM
Somme	1st	François Ruffin	LFI	François Ruffin	LFI
Somme	2nd	Cécile Delpirou	LREM	Barbara Pompili	LREM
Somme	3rd	Emmanuel Maquet	LR	Emmanuel Maquet	LR
Somme	4th	Jean-Claude Leclabart	LREM	Jean-Philippe Tanguy	RN
Somme	5th	Grégory Labille	UDI	Yaël Ménache	RN
Tarn	1st	Muriel Roques-Étienne	LREM	Frédéric Cabrolier	RN
Tarn	2nd	Marie-Christine Verdier-Jouclas	LREM	Karen Erodi	LFI
Tarn	3rd	Jean Terlier	LREM	Jean Terlier	LREM
Tarn-et-Garonne	1st	Valérie Rabault	PS	Valérie Rabault	PS
Tarn-et-Garonne	2nd	Sylvia Pinel	PRG	Marine Hamelet	RN
Var	1st	Geneviève Levy	LR	Yannick Chenevard	LREM
Var	2nd	Cécile Muschotti	LREM	Laure Lavalette	RN
Var	3rd	Jean-Louis Masson	LR	Stéphane Rambaud	RN
Var	4th	Sereine Mauborgne	LREM	Philippe Lottiaux	RN
Var	5th	Philippe Michel-Kleisbauer	MoDem	Julie Lechanteux	RN
Var	6th	Valérie Gomez-Bassac	LREM	Frank Giletti	RN
Var	7th	Émilie Guerel	LREM	Frédéric Boccaletti	RN
Var	8th	Fabien Matras	LREM	Philippe Schrek	RN
Vaucluse	1st	Jean-François Cesarini	LREM	Joris Hébrard	RN
Vaucluse	2nd	Jean-Claude Bouchet	LR	Bénédicte Auzanot	RN
Vaucluse	3rd	Brune Poirson	LREM	Hervé de Lépinau	RN
Vaucluse	4th	Jacques Bompard	LS	Marie-France Lorho	RN
Vaucluse	5th	Julien Aubert	LR	Jean-François Lovisolo	LREM
Vendée	1st	Philippe Latombe	MoDem	Philippe Latombe	MoDem
Vendée	2nd	Patrick Loiseau	LREM	Béatrice Bellamy	Horizons
Vendée	3rd	Stéphane Buchou	LREM	Stéphane Buchou	LREM
Vendée	4th	Martine Leguille-Balloy	LREM	Véronique Besse	SE
Vendée	5th	Pierre Henriet	LREM	Pierre Henriet	LREM
Vienne	1st	Françoise Ballet-Blu	LREM	Lisa Belluco	EELV
Vienne	2nd	Sacha Houlié	LREM	Sacha Houlié	LREM
Vienne	3rd	Jean-Michel Clément	LREM	Pascal Lecamp	MoDem
Vienne	4th	Nicolas Turquois	MoDem	Nicolas Turquois	MoDem
Haute-Vienne	1st	Sophie Beaudouin-Hubière	LREM	Damien Maudet	LFI
Haute-Vienne	2nd	Pierre Venteau	LREM	Stéphane Delautrette	PS
Haute-Vienne	3rd	Marie-Ange Magne	LREM	Manon Meunier	LFI
Vosges	1st	Stéphane Viry	LR	Stéphane Viry	LR
Vosges	2nd	Gérard Cherpion	LR	David Valence	LREM
Vosges	3rd	Christophe Naegelen	UDI	Christophe Naegelen	UDI
Vosges	4th	Jean-Jacques Gaultier	LR	Jean-Jacques Gaultier	LR
Yonne	1st	Guillaume Larrivé	LR	Daniel Grenon	RN
Yonne	2nd	André Villiers	UDI	André Villiers	Horizons
Yonne	3rd	Michèle Crouzet	MoDem	Julien Odoul	RN
Territoire de Belfort	1st	Ian Boucard	LR	Ian Boucard	LR
Territoire de Belfort	2nd	Michel Zumkeller	UDI	Florian Chauche	LFI
Essonne	1st	Francis Chouat	LREM	Farida Amrani	LFI
Essonne	2nd	Franck Marlin	LR	Nathalie da Conceicao Carvalho	RN
Essonne	3rd	Laëtitia Romeiro Dias	LREM	Alexis Izard	LREM
Essonne	4th	Marie-Pierre Rixain	LREM	Marie-Pierre Rixain	LREM
Essonne	5th	Cédric Villani	LREM	Paul Midy	LREM
Essonne	6th	Amélie de Montchalin	LREM	Jérôme Guedj	PS
Essonne	7th	Robin Reda	LR	Robin Reda	LREM
Essonne	8th	Nicolas Dupont-Aignan	DLF	Nicolas Dupont-Aignan	DLF
Essonne	9th	Marie Guévenoux	LREM	Marie Guévenoux	LREM
Essonne	10th	Pierre-Alain Raphan	LREM	Antoine Léaument	LFI
Hauts-de-Seine	1st	Elsa Faucillon	PCF	Elsa Faucillon	PCF
Hauts-de-Seine	2nd	Adrien Taquet	LREM	Francesca Pasquini	EELV
Hauts-de-Seine	3rd	Christine Hennion	LREM	Philippe Juvin	LR
Hauts-de-Seine	4th	Isabelle Florennes	LREM	Sabrina Sebaihi	EELV
Hauts-de-Seine	5th	Céline Calvez	LREM	Céline Calvez	LREM
Hauts-de-Seine	6th	Constance Le Grip	LR	Constance Le Grip	LREM
Hauts-de-Seine	7th	Jacques Marilossian	LREM	Pierre Cazeneuve	LREM
Hauts-de-Seine	8th	Jacques Maire	LREM	Prisca Thévenot	LREM
Hauts-de-Seine	9th	Thierry Solère	LR	Emmanuel Pellerin	LREM
Hauts-de-Seine	10th	Gabriel Attal	LREM	Gabriel Attal	LREM
Hauts-de-Seine	11th	Laurianne Rossi	LREM	Aurélien Saintoul	LFI
Hauts-de-Seine	12th	Jean-Louis Bourlanges	MoDem	Jean-Louis Bourlanges	MoDem
Hauts-de-Seine	13th	Frédérique Dumas	LREM	Maud Bregeon	LREM
Seine-Saint-Denis	1st	Éric Coquerel	LFI	Éric Coquerel	LFI
Seine-Saint-Denis	2nd	Stéphane Peu	PCF	Stéphane Peu	PCF
Seine-Saint-Denis	3rd	Patrice Anato	LREM	Thomas Portes	LFI
Seine-Saint-Denis	4th	Marie-George Buffet	PCF	Soumya Bourouaha	PCF
Seine-Saint-Denis	5th	Jean-Christophe Lagarde	UDI	Raquel Garrido	LFI
Seine-Saint-Denis	6th	Bastien Lachaud	LFI	Bastien Lachaud	LFI
Seine-Saint-Denis	7th	Alexis Corbière	LFI	Alexis Corbière	LFI
Seine-Saint-Denis	8th	Sylvie Charrière	LREM	Fatiha Keloua-Hachi	PS
Seine-Saint-Denis	9th	Sabine Rubin	LFI	Aurélie Trouvé	LFI
Seine-Saint-Denis	10th	Alain Ramadier	LR	Nadège Abomangoli	LFI
Seine-Saint-Denis	11th	Clémentine Autain	LFI	Clémentine Autain	LFI
Seine-Saint-Denis	12th	Stéphane Testé	LREM	Jérôme Legavre	POI
Val-de-Marne	1st	Frédéric Descrozaille	LREM	Frédéric Descrozaille	LREM
Val-de-Marne	2nd	Jean François Mbaye	LREM	Clémence Guetté	LFI
Val-de-Marne	3rd	Laurent Saint-Martin	LREM	Louis Boyard	LFI
Val-de-Marne	4th	Maud Petit	MoDem	Maud Petit	MoDem
Val-de-Marne	5th	Gilles Carrez	LR	Mathieu Lefevre	LREM
Val-de-Marne	6th	Guillaume Gouffier-Cha	LREM	Guillaume Gouffier-Cha	LREM
Val-de-Marne	7th	Jean-Jacques Bridey	LREM	Rachel Kéké	LFI
Val-de-Marne	8th	Michel Herbillon	LR	Michel Herbillon	LR
Val-de-Marne	9th	Luc Carvounas	PS	Isabelle Santiago	PS
Val-de-Marne	10th	Mathilde Panot	LFI	Mathilde Panot	LFI
Val-de-Marne	11th	Albane Gaillot	LREM	Sophie Taillé-Polian	G.s
Val-d'Oise	1st	Isabelle Muller-Quoy	LREM	Émilie Chandler	LREM
Val-d'Oise	2nd	Guillaume Vuilletet	LREM	Guillaume Vuilletet	LREM
Val-d'Oise	3rd	Cécile Rilhac	LREM	Cécile Rilhac	LREM
Val-d'Oise	4th	Naïma Moutchou	LREM	Naïma Moutchou	Horizons
Val-d'Oise	5th	Fiona Lazaar	LREM	Paul Vannier	LFI
Val-d'Oise	6th	Nathalie Élimas	MoDem	Estelle Folest	MoDem
Val-d'Oise	7th	Dominique Da Silva	LREM	Dominique Da Silva	LREM
Val-d'Oise	8th	François Pupponi	PS	Carlos Martens Bilongo	LFI
Val-d'Oise	9th	Zivka Park	LREM	Arnaud Le Gall	LFI
Val-d'Oise	10th	Aurélien Taché	LREM	Aurélien Taché	LND
Guadeloupe	1st	Olivier Serva	LREM	Olivier Serva	GUSR
Guadeloupe	2nd	Justine Bénin	MoDem	Christian Baptiste	PPDG
Guadeloupe	3rd	Max Mathiasin	MoDem	Max Mathiasin	MoDem
Guadeloupe	4th	Hélène Vainqueur-Christophe	PS	Élie Califer	PS
Martinique	1st	Josette Manin	BPM	Jiovanny William	Péyi-A
Martinique	2nd	Manuéla Kéclard-Mondésir	Péyi-A	Marcellin Nadeau	Péyi-A
Martinique	3rd	Serge Letchimy	PPM	Johnny Hajjar	PPM
Martinique	4th	Jean-Philippe Nilor	Péyi-A	Jean-Philippe Nilor	Péyi-A
French Guiana	1st	Gabriel Serville	Péyi G	Jean-Victor Castor	MDES
French Guiana	2nd	Lénaïck Adam	LREM	Davy Rimane	SE
Réunion	1st	Philippe Naillet	PS	Philippe Naillet	PS
Réunion	2nd	Karine Lebon	PLR	Karine Lebon	PLR
Réunion	3rd	Nathalie Bassire	LR	Nathalie Bassire	LR
Réunion	4th	David Lorion	LR	Emeline K/Bidi	LP
Réunion	5th	Jean-Hugues Ratenon	LFI	Jean-Hugues Ratenon	LFI
Réunion	6th	Nadia Ramassamy	LR	Frédéric Maillot	PLR
Réunion	7th	Jean-Luc Poudroux	LR	Perceval Gaillard	LFI
Mayotte	1st	Ramlati Ali	LREM	Estelle Youssouffa	SE
Mayotte	2nd	Mansour Kamardine	LR	Mansour Kamardine	LR
New Caledonia	1st	Philippe Dunoyer	CE	Philippe Dunoyer	CE
New Caledonia	2nd	Philippe Gomès	CE	Nicolas Metzdorf	GNC
French Polynesia	1st	Maina Sage	Tapura	Tematai Le Gayic	Tavini
French Polynesia	2nd	Nicole Sanquer	A here ia	Steve Chailloux	Tavini
French Polynesia	3rd	Moetai Brotherson	Tavini	Moetai Brotherson	Tavini
Saint-Pierre-et-Miquelon	1st	Stéphane Claireaux	CSA	Stéphane Lenormand	AD
Wallis and Futuna	1st	Sylvain Brial	SE	Mikaele Seo	LREM
Saint-Martin/Saint-Barthélemy	1st	Claire Javois	LR	Frantz Gumbs	RSM
French residents overseas	1st	Roland Lescure	LREM	Roland Lescure	LREM
French residents overseas	2nd	Paula Forteza	LREM	Éléonore Caroit	LREM
French residents overseas	3rd	Alexandre Holroyd	LREM	Alexandre Holroyd	LREM
French residents overseas	4th	Pieyre-Alexandre Anglade	LREM	Pieyre-Alexandre Anglade	LREM
French residents overseas	5th	Stéphane Vojetta	LREM	Stéphane Vojetta	LREM
French residents overseas	6th	Joachim Son-Forget	LREM	Marc Ferracci	LREM
French residents overseas	7th	Frédéric Petit	MoDem	Frédéric Petit	MoDem
French residents overseas	8th	Meyer Habib	UDI	Meyer Habib	UDI
French residents overseas	9th	M'jid El Guerrab	LREM	Karim Ben Cheikh	G.s
French residents overseas	10th	Amal Amélia Lakrafi	LREM	Amal Amélia Lakrafi	LREM
French residents overseas	11th	Anne Genetet	LREM	Anne Genetet	LREM

=== Electorate ===
Sociology of the electorate
Demographic	EXG	NUPES	DVG	ECO	ENS	DVC	UDC/DVD	UPF	RN	REC	Others
Total vote	1.2%	25.2%	4.1%	2.6%	25.2%	1.5%	13.7%	1.2%	18.9%	3.9%	2.5%
First-round vote in the 2022 presidential election
Jean-Luc Mélenchon	0%	85%	5%	3%	2%	0%	3%	0%	2%	0%	0%
Yannick Jadot	5%	39%	12%	11%	10%	6%	6%	0%	0%	0%	11%
Emmanuel Macron	0%	5%	3%	1%	71%	4%	12%	0%	0%	1%	3%
Valérie Pécresse	0%	3%	2%	1%	9%	3%	76%	0%	5%	1%	0%
Marine Le Pen	0%	5%	0%	1%	2%	0%	9%	1%	78%	2%	2%
Éric Zemmour	0%	1%	0%	3%	5%	0%	24%	1%	18%	46%	2%
Political party affiliation
LFI	0%	93%	3%	0%	0%	0%	1%	0%	2%	0%	1%
EELV	1%	52%	9%	11%	9%	0%	7%	0%	2%	0%	9%
PS	2%	43%	18%	2%	24%	0%	3%	1%	3%	0%	4%
LREM / MoDem	0%	2%	3%	1%	82%	5%	6%	0%	0%	0%	1%
LR / UDI	0%	2%	2%	2%	13%	0%	70%	0%	8%	2%	1%
RN	0%	3%	0%	1%	2%	0%	3%	0%	87%	1%	3%
REC	0%	0%	0%	0%	7%	0%	8%	1%	8%	76%	0%
None	2%	25%	3%	5%	21%	2%	18%	1%	19%	2%	2%
Sex
Men	1%	23%	4%	3%	25%	1%	14%	1%	21%	5%	2%
Women	2%	27%	4%	3%	25%	2%	14%	2%	17%	2%	2%
Age
18–24 years old	1%	42%	3%	3%	13%	0%	10%	1%	18%	5%	4%
25–34 years old	3%	38%	4%	5%	19%	1%	6%	2%	18%	4%	0%
35–49 years old	1%	31%	2%	3%	18%	2%	11%	1%	26%	2%	3%
50–59 years old	1%	22%	4%	4%	17%	1%	14%	2%	30%	3%	2%
60–69 years old	2%	26%	5%	1%	28%	2%	13%	1%	13%	5%	4%
70 or older	1%	15%	5%	2%	38%	1%	19%	1%	12%	4%	2%
Socio-occupational classification
Manager/professional	1%	28%	7%	3%	22%	7%	14%	0%	11%	4%	3%
Intermediate occupation	1%	35%	3%	4%	22%	0%	10%	1%	20%	2%	2%
White-collar worker	2%	31%	4%	3%	14%	3%	10%	3%	25%	3%	2%
Blue-collar worker	1%	18%	3%	3%	11%	0%	11%	1%	45%	4%	3%
Retired	1%	18%	5%	2%	35%	1%	18%	1%	12%	4%	3%
Employment status
Employee	1%	29%	4%	4%	18%	2%	11%	1%	25%	3%	2%
(Private employee)	1%	27%	2%	3%	19%	3%	12%	1%	25%	4%	3%
(Public employee)	2%	33%	7%	4%	16%	0%	9%	3%	24%	1%	1%
Self-employed	2%	25%	4%	2%	33%	0%	10%	3%	14%	7%	0%
Unemployed	4%	30%	2%	1%	7%	6%	11%	0%	27%	9%	3%
Education
Less than baccalauréat	1%	17%	2%	3%	27%	3%	12%	1%	28%	4%	2%
Baccalauréat	1%	24%	5%	2%	23%	0%	15%	1%	23%	3%	4%
Bac +2	1%	25%	5%	3%	23%	0%	16%	2%	18%	5%	2%
At least bac +3	2%	32%	4%	2%	27%	3%	12%	1%	11%	3%	3%
Monthly household income
Less than €1,250	3%	34%	2%	4%	19%	0%	7%	4%	21%	4%	2%
€1,250 to €2,000	2%	28%	5%	2%	19%	1%	12%	2%	23%	4%	2%
€2,000 to €3,000	1%	26%	5%	2%	27%	0%	11%	1%	21%	4%	2%
More than €3,000	0%	22%	4%	3%	28%	3%	17%	1%	15%	4%	3%
Moment of choice of vote
In the last few weeks	1%	29%	3%	1%	28%	1%	10%	1%	20%	5%	1%
In the last few days	3%	19%	6%	4%	20%	2%	22%	2%	17%	2%	3%
At the last moment	2%	13%	7%	8%	18%	6%	20%	3%	12%	2%	9%
Agglomeration
Fewer than 2,000 inhabitants	1%	27%	4%	2%	21%	0%	12%	2%	22%	4%	5%
2,000 to 10,000 inhabitants	2%	21%	5%	3%	21%	1%	14%	0%	26%	2%	5%
10,000 to 50,000 inhabitants	2%	22%	2%	2%	29%	0%	17%	1%	22%	3%	0%
50,000 to 200,000 inhabitants	2%	22%	6%	2%	23%	3%	13%	1%	22%	5%	1%
More than 200,000 inhabitants	1%	27%	4%	3%	28%	2%	14%	2%	13%	4%	2%
Religion
Roman Catholic	1%	13%	4%	3%	30%	1%	19%	1%	21%	5%	2%
(Regular practitioner)	1%	8%	8%	2%	26%	3%	29%	2%	14%	7%	0%
(Occasional practitioner)	1%	12%	2%	2%	27%	4%	28%	0%	17%	5%	2%
(Non-practitioner)	1%	13%	4%	3%	31%	1%	16%	2%	23%	4%	2%
Other religion	2%	38%	7%	5%	18%	0%	14%	0%	8%	3%	5%
Non religion	2%	39%	4%	2%	20%	2%	7%	1%	17%	3%	3%
Demographic											
Demographic	EXG	NUPES	DVG	ECO	ENS	DVC	UDC/DVD	UPF	RN	REC	Others
Sociology of the electorate
Source: Ipsos France

== Aftermath ==
Due to the Ensemble's loss of 100+ seats, they were now 44 seats shy of a majority in the National Assembly, and need to find support among other MPs from the left or the right side of politics to help build a working majority government. President Macron asked Prime Minister Borne, who offered her resignation, to stay in office with the same cabinet in an effort to gain time according to analysts to form a stable government, with or without Borne. LFI requested a vote of no confidence to be held on 5 July.

Despite not ruling out any deal with any party, it is speculated that Macron and Ensemble are eyeing a deal with UDC. Previously stating otherwise, UDC's Jacob confirmed that he would take part in talks with Macron. RN's Le Pen and the leaders of two NUPES parties, Olivier Faure (PS) and Fabien Roussel (PCF), stated that they would take part in talks with Macron. LFI's Mélenchon confirmed that he would not take part in talks.

=== Formation of parliamentary groups ===
Composition of the National Assembly on 29 June 2022
Parliamentary group		Members	Related	Total	President
GDR	Democratic and Republican Left - NUPES	22	0	22	André Chassaigne
LFI	La France Insoumise - NUPES	75	0	75	Mathilde Panot
ECO	Ecologist - NUPES	23	0	23	Julien Bayou
SOC	Socialists and affiliated - NUPES	27	4	31	Boris Vallaud
LIOT	Liberties, Independents, Overseas, and Territories	16	0	16	Bertrand Pancher
REN	Renaissance	168	4	172	Aurore Bergé
DEM	Democratic group, MoDem and Independents	48	0	48	Jean-Paul Mattei
HOR	Horizons and affiliated	28	2	30	Laurent Marcangeli
LR	The Republicans	59	3	62	Olivier Marleix
RN	National Rally	88	1	89	Marine Le Pen
NI	Non-Attached Members	9	–	9	–

=== Vote of no confidence ===
Shortly after the election, a vote of no confidence was tabled by the left-wing NUPES coalition. It was rejected as only left-wing parliamentary groups supported the motion.

Prime Minister Borne offered her resignation on 21 June 2022, but President Macron refused to accept it. Talks among the various parties to form a stable majority government began later on 21 June but rapidly failed. On 6 July, Borne presented her minority government policy plan to the Parliament.

== See also ==
- List of deputies of the 16th National Assembly of France
- Elections in France
