= New Caledonia's 1st constituency =

Constituency of the French Fifth Republic

1st constituency of New Caledonia
- inline Constituency of the National Assembly of France

- The constituency in New Caledonia
- Deputy: Nicolas Metzdorf; GNC
- Department: New Caledonia
- Cantons: Loyalty Islands, communes of Nouméa and Île des Pins
- Registered voters: 97,162

The 1st constituency of New Caledonia is a French legislative constituency in New Caledonia.

Between 1958 and 1962, the constituency represented all of the New Hebrides condominium and New Caledonia until a redistricting in 1978 created the 2nd constituency. Between 1978 and a new redistricting in 1986, the first constituency represented the Kanak-populated eastern shore of the main island in addition to the Loyalty Islands. Since 1986, the constituency has been composed of the Caldoche-populated loyalist of Nouméa and the Kanak-populated Loyalty Islands.

== Deputies ==
Election	Member	Party
1988	Jacques Lafleur	RPCR
1993	Jacques Lafleur	RPCR
1997	Jacques Lafleur	RPCR
2002	Jacques Lafleur	RPCR
2007	Gaël Yanno	RPCR
2012	Sonia Lagarde	UDI/CE
2017	Philippe Dunoyer	CE
2022	Philippe Dunoyer	CE
2024	Nicolas Metzdorf	GNC

== Election results ==
=== 2024 ===
Candidate	Party	Alliance	First round		Second round	
Candidate	Party	Alliance	Votes	%	Votes	%
Nicolas Metzdorf	GNC	LR-LL	22,316	39.81	34,577	52.41
Omayra Lisa Meun Naisseline	UC	FLNKS	20,370	36.34	31,399	47.59
Philippe Dunoyer	CE	Ensemble	5,791	10.33		
Veylma Falaeo	EO		2,731	4.87		
Simon Loueckhote	RN		2,562	4.57		
Muneiko Haocas	REG		1,229	2.19		
Juanita Ciane Angexetine	REG		344	0.61		
Cédric Devaud	ECO		235	0.42		
Pierre-Henri Cuénot	DVD		173	0.31		
Thomas Nasri	REC		158	0.28		
Germaine Toléta Nemia	REG		78	0.14		
Manuel Millar	DIV		63	0.11		
Valid votes			56,050	100.00	65,976	100.00
Blank votes			469	0.82	838	1.25
Null votes			397	0.70	363	0.54
Turnout			56,916	58.58	67,177	69.14
Abstentions			40,237	41.42	29,985	30.86
Registered voters			97,163		97,162	
Result			GNC GAIN FROM CE			

=== 2022 ===
Legislative Election 2022: New Caledonia's 1st constituency
Party	Candidate	Votes	%	±%
Ensemble (Ensemble)	Philippe Dunoyer	11,982	40.83	+12.95
FLNKS	Walisaune Wahetra	6,360	21.67	+10.57
LR (UDC)	Virginie Ruffenach	4,102	13.98	−0.07
DVD	Pascal Lafleur	2,171	7.40	N/A
RN	Guy-Olivier Cuénot	1,941	6.61	−0.14
DVC	Joël Kasarherou	1,461	4.98	N/A
LP (UPF)	Jérémy Simon	686	2.34	N/A
DVD	Antoine Gil	645	2.20	N/A
Turnout		29,348	31.02	−2.92
2nd round result
Ensemble (Ensemble)	Philippe Dunoyer	25,652	66.40	+7.25
FLNKS	Walisaune Wahetra	12,979	33.60	N/A
Turnout		38,631	40.98	+2.97
Ensemble hold				

=== 2017 ===
Candidate	Label	First round		Second round	
Candidate	Label	Votes	%	Votes	%
Philippe Dunoyer	CT (DVD)	7,780	27.88	17,744	59.15
Sonia Backès	DVD	4,821	17.27	12,256	40.85
Gaël Yanno	DVD	4,425	15.86		
Bernard Deladrière	LR	3,921	14.05		
Charles Washetine	REG	2,820	10.10		
Lina Balmelli	FN	1,884	6.75		
Louis Manta	FI	659	2.36		
Germaine Nemia-Bishop	REG	389	1.39		
Alain Descombels	DVD	367	1.32		
Philippe Gras	DVD	342	1.23		
Macate Wenehoua	REG	297	1.06		
Michel Hanocque	DIV	203	0.73		
Votes		27,908	100.00	30,000	100.00
Valid votes		27,908	96.58	30,000	92.70
Blank votes		753	2.61	1,703	5.26
Null votes		234	0.81	660	2.04
Turnout		28,895	33.94	32,363	38.01
Abstentions		56,253	66.06	52,783	61.99
Registered voters		85,148		85,146	
Source: Ministry of the Interior

=== 2012 ===
2012 legislative election in New Caledonia's 1st constituency
Candidate	Party	First round		Second round	
Candidate	Party	Votes	%	Votes	%
Gaël Yanno	UMP	10,880	30.96%	14,811	46.07%
Sonia Lagarde	DVD	9,405	26.76%	17,340	53.93%
Robert-Wienie Xowie		5,905	16.80%		
Isabelle Lafleur	DVD	3,697	10.52%		
Pierre Aube	FN	1,743	4.96%		
Stéphane Henocque	??	1,616	4.60%		
Michel Jorda	PS	1,272	3.62%		
Richard Sio	FG	627	1.78%		
Valid votes		35,145	98.27%	32,151	91.67%
Spoilt and null votes		620	1.73%	2,922	8.33%
Votes cast / turnout		35,765	46.78%	35,073	45.90%
Abstentions		40,688	53.22%	41,333	54.10%
Registered voters		76,453	100.00%	76,406	100.00%

=== 2007 ===
Legislative Election 2007: New Caledonia 1st – 2nd round
Party	Candidate	Votes	%	±%
UMP	Gaël Yanno	26,732	69.21	
FLNKS	Charles Washetine	11,891	30.79	
Turnout		38,623	57.73	
UMP hold		Swing		

== Sources ==
- Official results of French elections from 1998: "Résultats électoraux officiels en France" (in French).
