= 2024 French legislative election in Cantal =

Following the first round of the 2024 French legislative election on 30 June 2024, runoff elections in each constituency where no candidate received a vote share greater than 50 percent were scheduled for 7 July. Candidates permitted to stand in the runoff elections needed to either come in first or second place in the first round or achieve more than 12.5 percent of the votes of the entire electorate (as opposed to 12.5 percent of the vote share due to low turnout).

== Cantal ==
=== 1st constituency ===
Candidate	Party or alliance		First round		Second round	
Candidate	Party or alliance		Votes	%	Votes	%
Vincent Descoeur	Miscellaneous right	The Republicans	16,615	37.66	28,330	65.89
Dorothée Gallais	National Rally		13,361	30.29	14,668	34.11
Valérie Rueda	New Popular Front	Socialist Party	9,893	22.43		
Denis Sabot	Ensemble	Horizons	3,377	7.66		
Rémy Dauvillier	Far-left	Lutte Ouvrière	458	1.04		
Jean-Jacques Bruxelle	Reconquête		410	0.93		
Total			44,114	100.00	42,998	100.00
Valid votes			44,114	97.24	42,998	95.39
Invalid votes			509	1.12	694	1.54
Blank votes			744	1.64	1,384	3.07
Total votes			45,367	100.00	45,076	100.00
Registered voters/turnout			62,314	72.80	62,321	72.33

=== 2nd constituency ===
Candidate	Party or alliance		First round		Second round	
Candidate	Party or alliance		Votes	%	Votes	%
Jean-Yves Bony	Miscellaneous right	The Republicans	12,383	34.29	21,585	60.71
Gilles Lacroix	National Rally		11,923	33.02	13,967	39.29
Zoé Pebay	New Popular Front	La France Insoumise	4,919	13.62		
Louis Toty	Miscellaneous right	Independent	3,348	9.27		
Vladimir Tilmant-Tatischeff	Ensemble	Democratic Movement	3,019	8.36		
Mona Cheikhi	Far-left	Lutte Ouvrière	298	0.83		
Pascal Veysset-Rapaport	Reconquête		220	0.61		
Total			36,110	100.00	35,552	100.00
Valid votes			36,110	97.39	35,552	95.41
Invalid votes			376	1.01	506	1.36
Blank votes			592	1.60	1,204	3.23
Total votes			37,078	100.00	37,262	100.00
Registered voters/turnout			52,310	70.88	52,307	71.24
