= Sonia Lagarde =

Mayor of Nouméa, New Caledonia, France

Mayor of Nouméa
- Incumbent
- Assumed office 5 April 2014
- Preceded by: Jean Lèques

Member of the National Assembly for New Caledonia's 1st constituency
- In office 20 June 2012 – 20 June 2017
- Preceded by: Gaël Yanno
- Succeeded by: Philippe Dunoyer

Personal details
- Born: Sonia Boyer; 29 August 1948 (age 76); Nouméa, New Caledonia, France
- Political party: LREM

Sonia Lagarde (née Boyer; born 29 August 1948) is a French New Caledonian politician and the current mayor of Nouméa. She has been a member of the National Assembly for New Caledonia's 1st constituency since 2012.

== Career ==
Lagarde has been a member of various parties of the miscellaneous right opposed to The Rally-UMP: Une Nouvelle-Calédonie pour tous (UNCT) from 1995 to 1999, the Alliance from 1999 to 2004, Avenir ensemble from 2004 to 2008, and Caledonia Together since 2008.

Member of the Congress of New Caledonia from 1995 to 2012 and vice-president of the Assembly of the South Province from 2004 to 2011, she was elected as member of the National Assembly for New Caledonia's 1st constituency (comprising Nouméa, Isle of Pines, and the Loyalty Islands) 17 June 2012. After being the head of the municipal opposition to the majority of mayor Jean Lèques in Nouméa, she became mayor of the city following her victory in the 2014 municipal elections. In 2020, Lagarde was opposed by businessperson Cherifa Linossier in the mayoral election. Linossier was unsuccessful and Lagarde was re-elected.
