= Cantal's 1st constituency =

Constituency of the National Assembly of France

1st constituency of Cantal
- inline Constituency of the National Assembly of France

- The two constituencies of Cantal

- Cantal in France
- Deputy: Vincent Descœur; LR
- Department: Cantal
- Cantons: Arpajon-sur-Cère, Aurillac-1, Aurillac-2, Aurillac-2, Aurillac-4, Jussac, Laroquebrou, Maurs, Montsalvy, Saint-Cernin, Saint-Mamet-la-Salvetat, Vic-sur-Cère
- Registered voters: 82,541

The 1st constituency of Cantal is a French legislative constituency in the Cantal département.

== Deputies ==
Election	Member	Party
1988	Yves Coussain	UDF
1993	Yves Coussain	UDF
1997	Yves Coussain	UDF
2002	Yves Coussain	UMP
2007	Vincent Descœur	UMP
2012	Alain Calmette	PS
2017	Vincent Descœur	LR
2022	Vincent Descœur	LR
2024	Vincent Descœur	LR

== Election results ==
=== 2024 ===
Candidate	Party	Alliance	First round			Second round		
Candidate	Party	Alliance	Votes	%	+/–	Votes	%	+/–
Vincent Descœur	LR	UDC	16,615	37.66	-2.67	28,330	65.89	-3.13
Dorothée Gallais	RN		13,361	30.29	+19.08	14,668	34.11	new
Valérie Rueda	PS	NFP	9,893	22.43	+3.92	withdrew		
Denis Sabot	HOR	ENS	3,377	7.66	-14.59			
Rémy Dauvillier	LO		458	1.04	-0.29			
Jean-Jacques Bruxelle	REC		410	0.93	-2.14			
Votes			44,114	100.00		42,998	100.00	
Valid votes			44,114	97.24	+0.20	42,998	95.39	+6.38
Blank votes			744	1.64	-0.40	1,384	3.07	-4.58
Null votes			509	1.12	+0.20	694	1.54	-1.79
Turnout			45,367	72.80	+18.96	45,076	72.33	+25.48
Abstentions			16,947	27.20	-18.96	17,245	27.67	-25.48
Registered voters			62,314			62,321		
Result			LR HOLD					

=== 2022 ===
Legislative Election 2022: Cantal's 1st constituency
Party	Candidate	Votes	%	±%
LR (UDC)	Vincent Descœur	13,299	40.33	+7.36
LREM (Ensemble)	Michel Teyssedou	7,338	22.25	-14.40
LFI (NUPÉS)	Michel Maciazek	6,104	18.51	+1.22
RN	Dorothée Gallais	3,695	11.21	+4.74
DVD	Jean-Pierre Delpont	1,088	3.30	N/A
REC	Guillaume De Ballincourt	1,013	3.07	N/A
LO	Rémy Dauvillier	437	1.33	+0.75
Turnout		32,974	53.84	−1.16
2nd round result
LR (UDC)	Vincent Descœur	18,165	69.02	+17.91
LREM (Ensemble)	Michel Teyssedou	8,152	30.98	−17.91
Turnout		26,317	46.85	−5.68
LR hold		Swing	+17.91	

=== 2017 ===
Candidate	Label	First round		Second round	
Candidate	Label	Votes	%	Votes	%
François Danemans	REM	12,411	36.65	14,829	48.89
Vincent Descœur	LR	11,165	32.97	15,501	51.11
Thierry Bonhoure	FI	3,407	10.06		
Marie-Claire Nather	FN	2,191	6.47		
Stéphane Fréchou	ECO	1,574	4.65		
François Vermande	DVD	1,430	4.22		
Jean-François Barrier	PCF	873	2.58		
Michel Fabre	ECO	474	1.40		
Rémy Dauvillier	EXG	198	0.58		
Grégory Pautrat	DIV	143	0.42		
Votes		33,866	100.00	30,330	100.00
Valid votes		33,866	97.75	30,330	91.70
Blank votes		499	1.44	1,850	5.59
Null votes		280	0.81	895	2.71
Turnout		34,645	55.00	33,075	52.53
Abstentions		28,350	45.00	29,894	47.47
Registered voters		62,995		62,969	
Source: Ministry of the Interior

=== 2012 ===
Summary of the 10 June and 17 June 2012 French legislative election in Cantal’s 1st Constituency
Candidate	Party		1st round		2nd round	
Candidate	Party		Votes	%	Votes	%
Alain Calmette	Socialist Party	PS	17,154	42.92%	21,883	51.63%
Vincent Descœur	Union for a Popular Movement	UMP	16,478	41.23%	20,500	48.37%
Philippe Drouault	Front National	FN	2,164	5.41%		
Thierry Galeau	Left Front	FG	1,347	3.37%		
Vincent Bessat	Europe Ecology – The Greens	EELV	1,049	2.62%		
Chantal Mazieres	Miscellaneous Left	DVG	805	2.01%		
Nicole Soulenq-Moissinac		CEN	786	1.97%		
Rémy Dauvillier	Far Left	EXG	179	0.45%		
François Bre	Other	AUT	2	0.01%		
Total			39,964	100%	42,383	100%
Registered voters			64,438		64,432	
Blank/Void ballots			726	1.13%	1,102	1.71%
Turnout			40,690	63.15%	43,485	67.49%
Abstentions			23,748	36.85%	20,947	32.51%
Result					PS gain from UMP	

=== 2007 ===
Summary of the 10 June and 17 June 2007 French legislative election in Cantal’s 1st Constituency
Candidate	Party		1st round		2nd round	
Candidate	Party		Votes	%	Votes	%
Vincent Descœur	Union for a Popular Movement	UMP	18,035	44.45%	22,584	55.96%
Jacques Markarian	Socialist Party	PS	11,872	29.26%	17,774	44.04%
François Vermande	Miscellaneous Right	DVD	4,205	10.36%		
Christiane Missegue	Democratic Movement	MoDem	1,917	4.72%		
Patrick Perrier	Communist	PCF	1,439	3.55%		
Vincent Bessat	The Greens	VEC	1,166	2.87%		
Véronique Bamas	Far Left	EXG	764	1.88%		
Thierry Krzeminski	Front National	FN	539	1.33%		
Rémy Dauvillier	Far Left	EXG	257	0.63%		
Yolande Trouillet	Movement for France	MPF	217	0.53%		
François Bre	Independent	DIV	109	0.27%		
Christine Gaymard	Independent	DIV	53	0.13%		
Total			40,573	100%	40,358	100%
Registered voters			64,765		64,764	
Blank/Void ballots			812	1.96%	1,247	3.00%
Turnout			41,385	63.90%	41,605	64.24%
Abstentions			23,380	36.10%	23,159	35.76%
Result					UMP HOLD	

=== 2002 ===
Legislative Election 2002: Cantal's 1st constituency
Party	Candidate	Votes	%	±%
UMP	Yves Coussain	13,198	30.23	
PS	René Souchon	12,829	29.38	
DVD	François Vermande	5,055	11.58	
DVD	Christian Meiniel	3,295	7.55	
PR	Yvon Bec	2,715	6.22	
FN	Helene Berodias	1,671	3.83	
PCF	Jean-Pierre Roume	1,162	2.66	
LV	Vincent Bessat	1,031	2.36	
EXD	William Schmid	907	2.08	
Others	N/A	1,796		
Turnout		44,777	69.90	
2nd round result
UMP	Yves Coussain	23,652	57.05	
PS	René Souchon	17,805	42.95	
Turnout		43,544	67.98	
UMP gain from UDF				

=== 1997 ===
Legislative Election 1997: Cantal's 1st constituency
Party	Candidate	Votes	%	±%
UDF	Yves Coussain	15,433	36.94	
PS	René Souchon	13,807	33.05	
DVG	Michel Georgelin	5,089	12.18	
FN	Paul Bardot	2,430	5.82	
PCF	Jean-Pierre Roume	2,286	5.47	
RPR	Louis Brugère	886	2.12	
Others	N/A	1,848		
Turnout		44,439	70.35	
2nd round result
UDF	Yves Coussain	23,403	50.43	
PS	René Souchon	23,006	49.57	
Turnout		48,669	77.06	
UDF hold				

== Sources ==
- French Interior Ministry results website: "Résultats électoraux officiels en France" (in French).
