= Nicolas Metzdorf =

New Caledonian politician

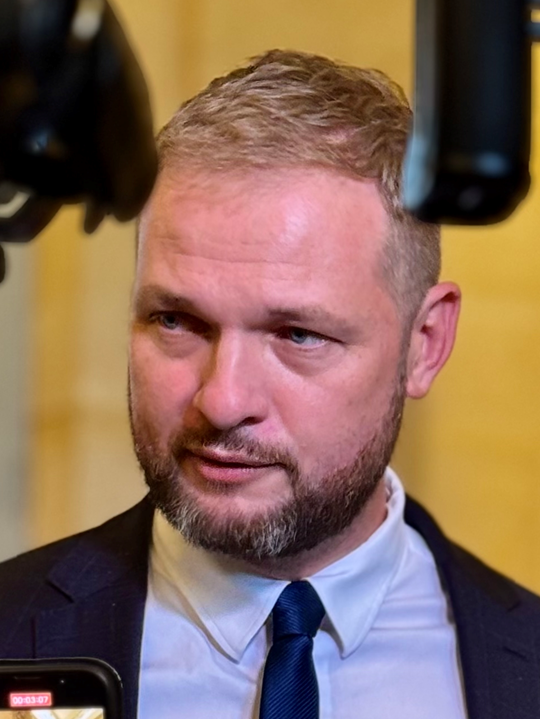
- Metzdorf speaking to the press in 2024

Member of the National Assembly for New Caledonia's 1st constituency
- Incumbent
- Assumed office July 8, 2024
- Preceded by: Philippe Dunoyer

Member of the National Assembly for New Caledonia's 2nd constituency
- In office June 22, 2022 – July 8, 2024
- Preceded by: Philippe Gomès
- Succeeded by: Emmanuel Tjibaou

Personal details
- Born: 20 May 1988 (age 38) Nouméa, New Caledonia
- Party: Générations NC
- Education: University of Strasbourg; Paris Diderot University

Nicolas Metzdorf (born 20 May 1988) is a New Caledonian politician. He is the founding president of the Générations NC, and has served as a Deputy in the French National Assembly from New Caledonia's 2nd constituency from 2022 to 2024 and New Caledonia's 1st constituency since 2024.

== Early life and education ==
Metzdorf was born 20 May 1988 to Claude Metzdorf and Yasmina Kurtovitch. He is of Belgian, Bosnian, English and French descent. His Caldoche parents were stockmen and involved in the pro-loyalist movement. He was raised in Poya, New Caledonia. After completing his secondary education, he went to Europe to attend university. He earned Bachelor's degree in Agronomy from the University of Strasbourg and a master's degree in agro-geography from Paris Diderot University and AgroParisTech.

== Political career ==
In 2019, he left Caledonia Together and established Générations NC. He was elected mayor of La Foa in 2020. He was elected to the National Assembly from New Caledonia's 2nd constituency in 2022. In the 2024 election, he changed from the 2nd constituency to the 1st constituency to run against incumbent Philippe Dunoyer of Générations NC's rival Caledonia Together. Metzdorf defeated Dunoyer in the first round and then defeated pro-independence candidate Omayra Naisseline in the second round. A pro-independence candidate, Emmanuel Tjibaou of Caledonian Union, won to succeed Metzdorf in the 2nd.

== See also ==
- List of deputies of the 16th National Assembly of France
- List of deputies of the 17th National Assembly of France
