= Cherifa Linossier =

New Caledonian businesswoman

Cherifa Linossier is a businesswoman from New Caledonia, who was leader of the Confederation of Small and Medium Enterprises (CPME).

== Career ==
From 2013 to 2020 Linossier was the Head of the New Caledonia Confederation of Small and Medium Enterprises (CPME), an advocacy organisation which represents the rights of small and medium-sized businesses. She is also a member of Le conseil économique, social et environnemental de Nouvelle-Calédonie (CESE-NC), one of sixteen for the southern provinces and member of the internal commissions for education and for economic development. In 2020, having left the CPME after working there for seven years, Linossier announced that she intended to run for election as Mayor of Nouméa. Her electoral mission aimed to revitalise the city of Noumea. Linossier was unsuccessful and Sonia Lagarde was re-elected.

In 2019 she lodged a complaint with the French High Commission after Robby Judes, the French ambassador to Vanuatu, assaulted her at a business function, along with seven other women. The prosecutor dropped the case after Judes was dismissed from his post. This action led to protests outside the court in Nouméa in July 2019 to demonstrate support for survivors of sexual assault.
