= Finistère's 3rd constituency =

Constituency of the National Assembly of France

3rd constituency of Finistère
- inline Constituency of the National Assembly of France

- Constituency in department

- Finistère in France
- Deputy: Didier Le Gac; RE
- Department: Finistère
- Cantons: Brest I, Brest II, Brest V, Plabennec, Ploudalmézeau, Saint-Renan

The 3rd constituency of Finistère is a French legislative constituency in the Finistère département. Like the other 576 French constituencies, it elects one MP using the two-round system, with a run-off if no candidate receives over 50% of the vote in the first round.

== Historic representation ==
Election	Member	Party
1988	Jean-Louis Goasduff	RPR
1993	Jean-Louis Goasduff	RPR
1997	François Cuillandre	PS
2002	Marguerite Lamour	UMP
2007	Marguerite Lamour	UMP
2012	Jean-Luc Bleunven	DVG
2017	Didier Le Gac	LREM
2022	Didier Le Gac	LREM
2024	Didier Le Gac	RE

== Election results ==
=== 2024 ===
Candidate	Party	Alliance	First round			Second round		
Candidate	Party	Alliance	Votes	%	+/–	Votes	%	+/–
Didier Le Gac	RE	ENS	26,139	38.92	-2.45	44,449	69.13	+11.23
Martine Donval	RN		18,627	27.74	+14.53	19,848	30.87	N/A
Pierre Smolarz	LFI	NFP	18,074	26.91	-2.27	WITHDREW		
Hélène Fave	DVD		1,808	2.69	N/A			
Marie-Louise Thomas	DLF		1,050	1.56	-0.09			
Matthieu Muller	LO		742	1.10	-0.15			
Ronan Perrot	REC		427	0.64	-2.57			
Annie Colinet	DIV		293	0.44	N/A			
Valid votes			67,160	97.30	-0.44	64,297	94.14	+0.10
Blank votes			1,505	2.18	+0.27	3,520	5.15	+0.51
Null votes			358	0.52	+0.17	480	0.70	-0.41
Turnout			69,023	73.54	+21.92	68,297	72.76	+23.26
Abstentions			24,830	26.46	-21.92	25,571	27.24	-23.26
Registered voters			93,853			93,868		
Source: Ministry of the Interior, Le Monde
Result						RE HOLD		

=== 2022 ===
Legislative Election 2022: Finistère's 3rd constituency
Party	Candidate	Votes	%	±%
LREM (Ensemble)	Didier Le Gac	19,442	41.37	-2.64
LFI (NUPÉS)	Pierre Smorlarz	13,712	29.18	+16.12
RN	Roger Abasq	5,989	12.74	+5.90
LR (UDC)	Francis Le Bian	2,997	6.38	−3.65
REC	Patricia Le Moign	1,507	3.21	N/A
DVE	Jean-Marc Governatori	1,240	2.64	N/A
Others	N/A	2,104	4.48	
Turnout		46,991	51.62	−3.14
2nd round result
LREM (Ensemble)	Didier Le Gac	25,169	57.90	-2.79
LFI (NUPÉS)	Pierre Smorlarz	18,298	42.10	N/A
Turnout		43,467	49.50	+3.90
LREM hold				

=== 2017 ===
Candidate	Label	First round		Second round	
Candidate	Label	Votes	%	Votes	%
Didier Le Gac	REM	21,085	44.01	22,593	60.69
Jean-Luc Bleunven	DVG	7,282	15.20	14,633	39.31
Christine Panaget	FI	5,786	12.08		
Marie-Catherine Mouchot	LR	4,807	10.03		
Guy Leal	FN	3,275	6.84		
Patrick Appere	DVG	1,517	3.17		
Yves Gueguen	DLF	1,043	2.18		
Loïc Duprat	REG	761	1.59		
Marie-Laure de Parcevaux	DVD	742	1.55		
Jean-Paul Cam	PCF	470	0.98		
Marie-Louise Thomas	DIV	314	0.66		
Fabrice Merlin	EXG	304	0.63		
Fabrice Almeras	DIV	262	0.55		
Romain Morin	DIV	258	0.54		
Votes		47,906	100.00	37,226	100.00
Valid votes		47,906	97.95	37,226	91.41
Blank votes		816	1.67	2,777	6.82
Null votes		188	0.38	722	1.77
Turnout		48,910	54.76	40,725	45.60
Abstentions		40,412	45.24	48,586	54.40
Registered voters		89,322		89,311	
Source: Ministry of the Interior

=== 2012 ===
2012 legislative election in Finistere's 3rd constituency
Candidate	Party	First round		Second round	
Candidate	Party	Votes	%	Votes	%
Marguerite Lamour	UMP	20,177	38.82%	24,765	47.71%
Jean-Luc Bleunven	PS dissident	11,054	21.27%	27,146	52.29%
Magali Deval	EELV–PS	10,799	20.78%		
Joël Menard	FN	3,913	7.53%		
Bertrand Seys	FG	2,602	5.01%		
Christiane Migot	PRG	1,526	2.94%		
Patrick Pelissard	MoDem	1,170	2.25%		
Chris Perrot		488	0.94%		
Fabrice Merlin	LO	251	0.48%		
Valid votes		51,980	98.82%	51,911	97.89%
Spoilt and null votes		623	1.18%	1,110	2.09%
Votes cast / turnout		52,603	60.98%	53,031	61.47%
Abstentions		33,665	39.02%	33,235	38.53%
Registered voters		86,268	100.00%	86,266	100.00%

=== 2007 ===
Legislative Election 2007: Finistère's 3rd constituency
Party	Candidate	Votes	%	±%
UMP	Marguerite Lamour	25,189	42.70	
PS	François Cuillandre	19,102	32.38	
MoDem	Laurent Merer	6,827	11.57	
LV	Jean Augereau	2,449	4.15	
Far left	Erwan Quelennec	1,616	2.74	
Others	N/A	3,804		
Turnout		59,753	64.59	
2nd round result
UMP	Marguerite Lamour	30,490	52.37	
PS	François Cuillandre	27,728	47.63	
Turnout		59,583	64.41	
UMP hold				

=== 2002 ===
Legislative Election 2002: Finistère's 3rd constituency
Party	Candidate	Votes	%	±%
PS	François Cuillandre	19,788	35.16	
UMP	Marguerite Lamour	12,527	22.26	
UMP	Antoine Corolleur	7,892	14.02	
DVD	Fortune Pellicano	3,544	6.30	
FN	Claude Herrmann	2,948	5.24	
LV	Jean Augereau	2,939	5.22	
DVD	Andre Jourt	1,814	3.22	
Others	N/A	4,833		
Turnout		57,096	65.90	
2nd round result
UMP	Marguerite Lamour	28,931	51.84	
PS	François Cuillandre	26,877	48.16	
Turnout		57,095	65.90	
UMP hold				

=== 1997 ===
Legislative Election 1997: Finistère's 3rd constituency
Party	Candidate	Votes	%	±%
PS	François Cuillandre	15,213	27.53	
RPR	Jean-Louis Lamour	10,838	19.61	
DVD	Bernard Foricher	8,073	14.61	
UDF	Marcel Le Floc'h	4,876	8.82	
FN	Pierre-Jean Bodiger	4,657	8.43	
PCF	Daniel Maloisel	3,005	5.44	
LV	Michel Briand	2,413	4.37	
GE	Annie Muniglia	1,654	2.99	
Far left	Jean-Claude Bachelier	1,500	2.71	
DVD	Olivier de Kermenguy	1,335	2.42	
Others	N/A	1,691		
Turnout		57,480	69.16	
2nd round result
PS	François Cuillandre	29,329	50.31	
RPR	Jean-Louis Lamour	28,969	49.69	
Turnout		60,710	73.05	
PS gain from RPR				

== References and Sources ==
- Official results of French elections from 1998: "Résultats électoraux officiels en France" (in French). Archived from the original on 20 December 2011.
