= New Caledonia's 2nd constituency =

Constituency of the French Fifth Republic

2nd constituency of New Caledonia
- inline Constituency of the National Assembly of France

- The constituency in New Caledonia
- Deputy: Emmanuel Tjibaou; UC
- Department: New Caledonia
- Cantons: North Province and a majority of South Province
- Registered voters: 124,939

The 2nd constituency of New Caledonia is a French legislative constituency in New Caledonia.

The second constituency was created in a redistricting in 1978. Between 1978 and a new redistricting in 1986, the second constituency represented the western shore of the main island, but its main population centre was Nouméa, a largely French-populated loyalist stronghold. Since 1986, the constituency has been composed of the so-called brousse—that is, the rural parts of the main island, which are mostly Kanak, but also the more populous French-populated suburbs of Nouméa.

== Deputies ==
Election	Member	Party
1988	Maurice Nénou	RPCR
1993	Maurice Nénou	RPCR
1997	Pierre Frogier	RPCR
2002	Pierre Frogier	RPCR
2007	Pierre Frogier	RPCR
2012	Philippe Gomès	UDI/CE
2017	Philippe Gomès	UDI/CE
2022	Nicolas Metzdorf	GNC/RE
2024	Emmanuel Tjibaou	UC

== Election results ==
=== 2024 ===
Candidate	Party	Alliance	First round		Second round	
Candidate	Party	Alliance	Votes	%	Votes	%
Emmanuel Tjibaou	UC	FLNKS	32,926	44.06	51,724	57.44
Alcide Ponga	LR	LR-LL	27,038	36.18	38,320	42.56
Milakulo Tukumuli	EO		8,906	11.92		
Gérard Poadja	CE	Ensemble	3,946	5.28		
Luther Voudjo	REG		1,114	1.49		
Ronald Frère	REG		808	1.08		
Valid votes			74,738	100.00	90,044	100.00
Blank votes			1,042	1.36	745	0.82
Null votes			609	0.80	745	0.82
Turnout			76,389	61.14	91,284	73.06
Abstentions			48,562	38.86	33,655	26.94
Registered voters			124,951		124,939	
Result			UC GAIN FROM GNC/RE			

=== 2022 ===
Legislative Election 2022: New Caledonia's 2nd constituency
Party	Candidate	Votes	%	±%
LREM (Ensemble)	Nicolas Metzdorf	13,552	33.71	N/A
FLNKS	Gérard Reignier	13,175	32.77	+2.69
LR (UDC)	Thierry Santa	8,758	21.78	−2.16
DVD	Pascal Lafleur	2,171	7.40	N/A
DVC	Joël Kasarherou	1,461	4.98	N/A
RN	Alain Descombels	1,600	3.98	+7.71
REG	Muneiko Haocas	1,362	3.39	N/A
DVC	Michèle Homboe	1,014	2.52	N/A
Others	N/A	1,141	1.84	−
Turnout		40,202	33.70	−3.47
2nd round result
LREM (Ensemble)	Nicolas Metzdorf	31,398	54.23	N/A
FLNKS	Gérard Reignier	26,500	45.77	+0.72
Turnout		57,898	48.46	−3.99
LREM gain from UDI				

=== 2017 ===
Candidate	Label	First round		Second round	
Candidate	Label	Votes	%	Votes	%
Louis Mapou	REG	11,262	30.08	23,413	45.05
Philippe Gomès	CE (UDI)	8,963	23.94	28,557	54.95
Harold Martin	DVD	5,752	15.36		
Bianca Hénin	FN	4,378	11.69		
Gil Brial	DVD	3,746	10.00		
Pascal Vittori	DVD	2,556	6.83		
Henry Bodeouarou	REG	366	0.98		
Oscar Diaz	DIV	265	0.71		
Manuel Millar	DIV	155	0.41		
Votes		37,443	100.00	51,970	100.00
Valid votes		37,443	96.28	51,970	94.69
Blank votes		1,012	2.60	1,950	3.55
Null votes		433	1.11	962	1.75
Turnout		38,888	37.17	54,882	52.45
Abstentions		65,748	62.83	49,752	47.55
Registered voters		104,636		104,634	
Source: Ministry of the Interior

=== 2012 ===
2012 legislative election in Nouvelle-Caledonie's 2nd constituency
Candidate	Party	First round		Second round	
Candidate	Party	Votes	%	Votes	%
Jean-Pierre Djaiwe	REG	15,890	36.20%	25,644	47.45%
Philippe Gomes	UDI	14,470	32.96%	28,398	52.55%
Eric Gay	UMP	8,814	20.08%		
Bianca Henin	FN	2,534	5.77%		
Cédrik Sangarne	DVD	2,193	5.00%		
Valid votes		43,901	97.75%	54,042	96.95%
Spoilt and null votes		1,009	2.25%	1,698	3.05%
Votes cast / turnout		44,910	50.28%	55,740	62.41%
Abstentions		44,413	49.72%	33,571	37.59%
Registered voters		89,323	100.00%	89,311	100.00%

=== 2007 ===
Legislative Election 2007: New Caledonia 2nd – 2nd round
Party	Candidate	Votes	%	±%
UMP	Pierre Frogier	25,559	54.13	
FLNKS	Charles Pidjot	21,663	45.87	
Turnout		47,222	62.18	
UMP hold		Swing		

=== 2002 ===
Legislative Election 2002: New Caledonia 2nd – 2nd round
Party	Candidate	Votes	%	±%
UMP	Pierre Frogier	15,719	55.70	
FLNKS	Paul Neaoutyine	12,495	44.30	
Turnout		22,729	42.17	
UMP hold		Swing		

=== 1997 ===
Legislative Election 1997: New Caledonia 2nd – 2nd round
Party	Candidate	Votes	%	±%
RPR	Pierre Frogier	15,398	60.99	
FLNKS	Philippe Pentecost	9,849	39.01	
Turnout		25,247	48.58	
RPR hold		Swing		

== Sources ==
- Official results of French elections from 1998: "Résultats électoraux officiels en France" (in French).
- Official results of French elections from 2017: "Résultats des élections législatives 2017 Nouvelle-Calédonie (988) - 2ème circonscription" (in French). Ministry of the Interior.
