= Philippe Dunoyer =

French politician (born 1968)

Member of the French National Assembly for New Caledonia's 1st constituency
- In office 21 June 2017 – 9 June 2024
- Preceded by: Sonia Lagarde
- Succeeded by: Nicolas Metzdorf

Personal details
- Born: 11 January 1968 (age 58) Nouméa, New Caledonia
- Party: CE

Philippe Dunoyer (born 11 January 1968, in Nouméa) is a French politician from Caledonia Together who has been Member of Parliament for New Caledonia's 1st constituency from 2017 to 2024.

== Origins and training ==
Born into one of the oldest European families to settle in New Caledonia, he is a fourth-generation descendant through his mother of Eugène Porcheron, who arrived in Port-de-France in 1856 and was the first elected mayor of Nouméa from 1882 to 1883. His mother, Monique Dunoyer, née Porcheron, was head of personnel at the local RFO station and has been Switzerland's Honorary Consul in New Caledonia since November 1, 1988.

After completing his schooling in Nouméa, he studied at the Faculty of Applied Economics at the Université Aix-Marseille III in Aix-en-Provence, where he obtained a master's degree in business law and a postgraduate diploma (DESS) in taxation. He returned to New Caledonia in 1993 to carry out his military service as a VAT at the New Caledonian tax department. He worked there until 2004.

He was reelected in the 2022 election. In the 2024 election, he came third in the first round, and lost her seat.
