= Emmanuel Tjibaou =

French politician

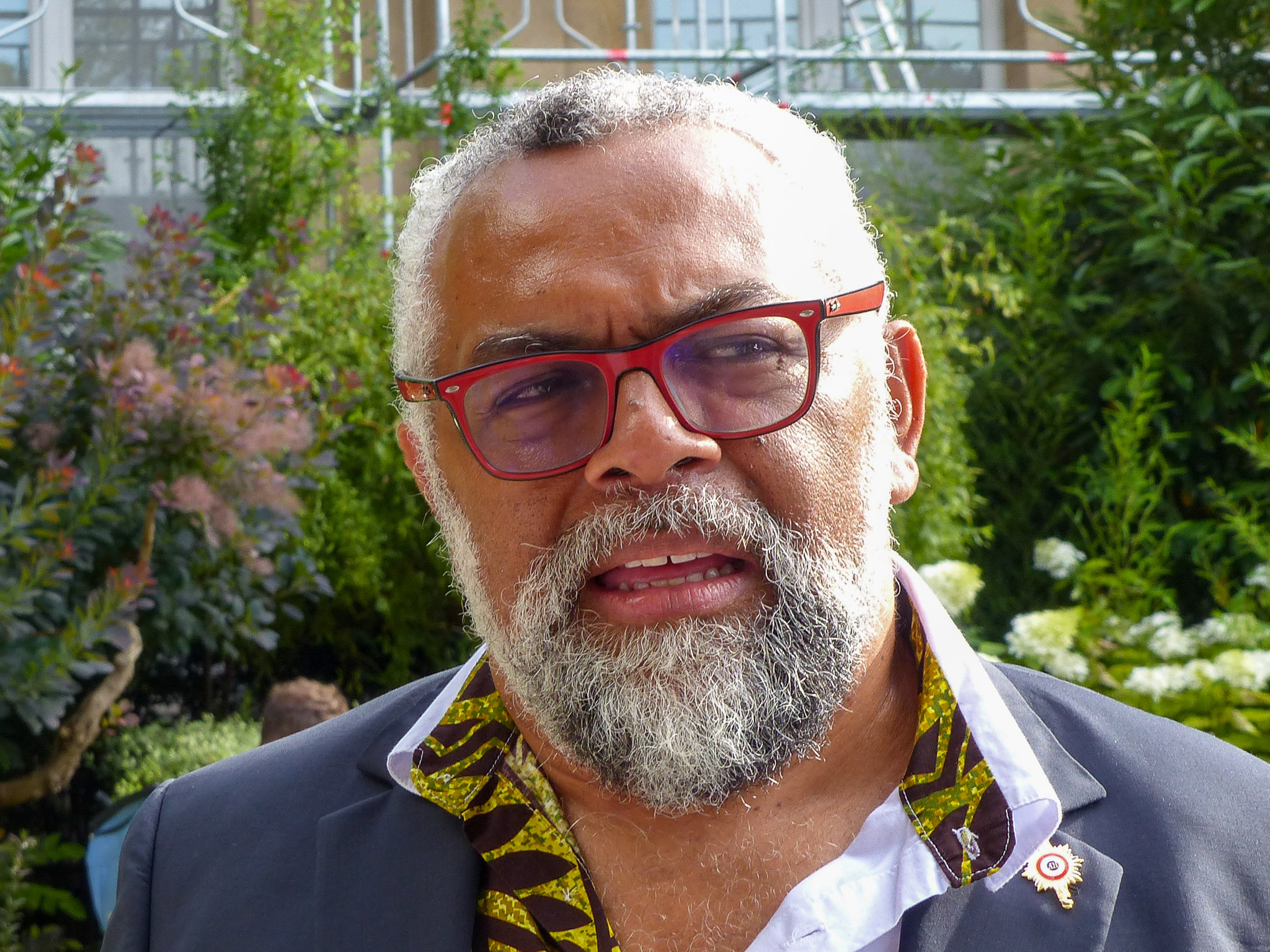

Member of the French National Assembly for New Caledonia's 2nd constituency
- Incumbent
- Assumed office 18 July 2024
- Preceded by: Nicolas Metzdorf

Personal details
- Political party: Caledonian Union
- Parents: Jean-Marie Tjibaou (father); Marie-Claude Tjibaou (mother)

Emmanuel Tjibaou (French pronunciation: [emanɥɛl tʃibau]) is a French politician of the Caledonian Union who was elected member of the National Assembly for New Caledonia's 2nd constituency in 2024. He is the son of Jean-Marie and Marie-Claude Tjibaou.

Tjibaou became the first pro-independence New Caledonian candidate to win a seat since 1986, with his victory being linked to the aftermath of the civil unrest across the archipelago earlier in 2024.
