= Didier Le Gac =

French politician

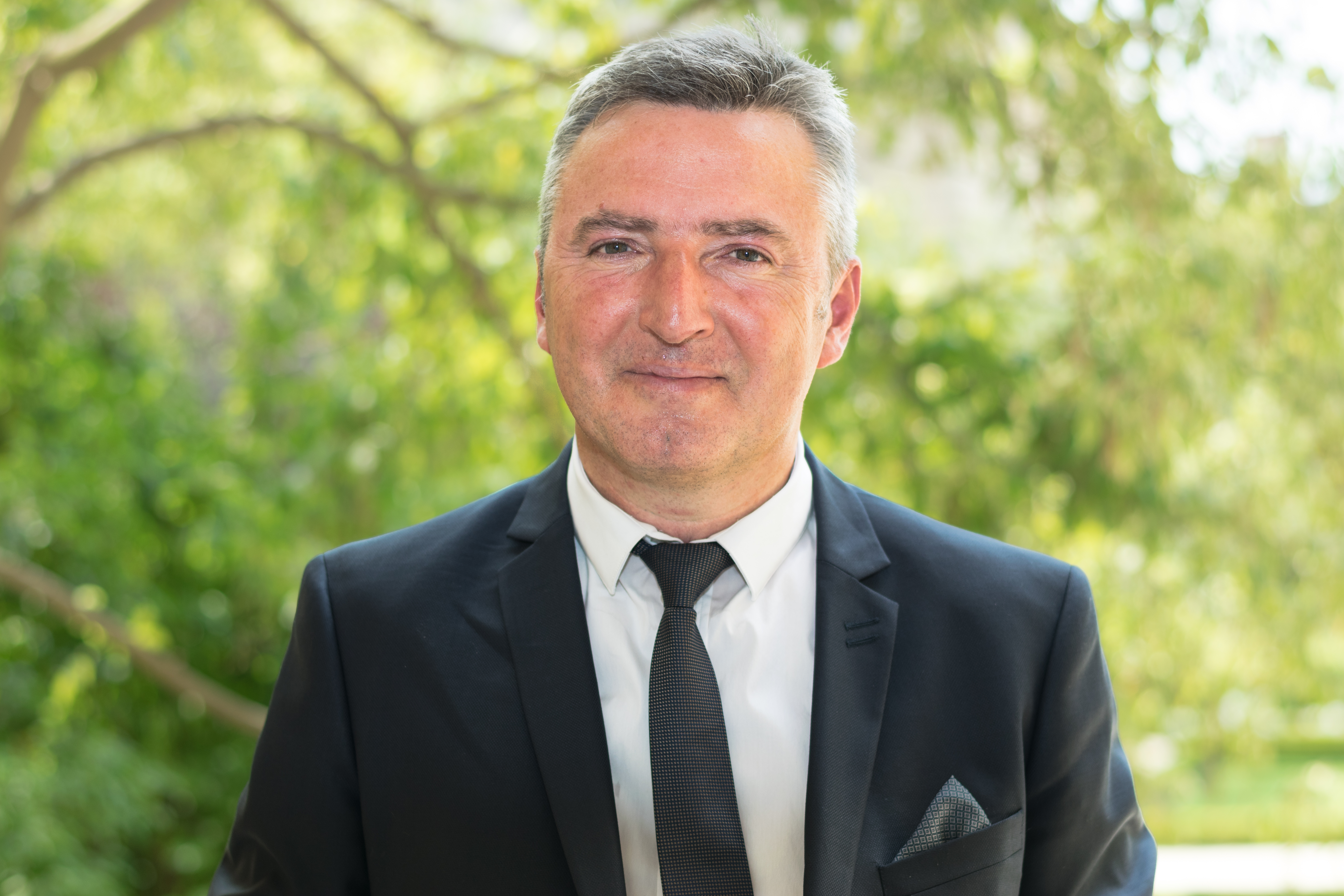
Didier Le Gac in June 2017.

Didier Le Gac is a French politician representing La République En Marche! and Territories of Progress. He was elected to the French National Assembly on 18 June 2017, representing the 3rd constituency of the department of Finistère.

== See also ==
- 2017 French legislative election
