= Générations NC =

Political party in New Caledonia

Generations New Caledonia Générations NC
- Abbreviation: GNC
- President: Nicolas Metzdorf
- Spokesperson: Nina Julie
- Secretary General: Cynthia Jan
- Vice Presidents: Yolande Honakoko; Stéphane Poiwi; Nicolas Fijalkowski
- Founded: 6 March 2019
- Split from: Caledonia Together
- Headquarters: 41 Rue Anatole-France, Nouméa
- Ideology: Anti-separatism; Autonomism; Conservative liberalism; Centralism; Ecologism
- Political position: Centre to centre-right
- Regional affiliation: Les Loyalistes
- Colours: Teal; Orange
- Seats in the National Assembly: 1 / 2 (50%)
- Seats in the Congress: 1 / 54 (2%)
- Seats in the South Province: 2 / 40 (5%)
- Seats in the North Province: 1 / 22 (5%)
- Seats in the Loyalty Islands Province: 0 / 14 (0%)

Website
- generations.nc

Générations NC (GNC) is a political party in New Caledonia. It is led by Nicolas Metzdorf who is also the party's only Member of Parliament.

== History ==
GNC was established by former members of Caledonia Together who had grown disillusioned with the party's course under Philippe Gomès and disagreed with its consideration of a tactical collaboration with pro-separatist parties in the South Province against The Rally and Caledonian Republicans which they saw as a betrayal of Caledonia Together's anti-independence policy.

Politically, the GNC is a loyalist and anti-separatist party which supports maintaining New Caledonia's status as part of overseas France. It also calls for the No results of the 2018 and 2021 New Caledonian independence referendums to be respected. However, in contrast to the traditional stance of the more right-orientated anti-separatist movements, GNC describes itself as socially liberal and promotes a distinct New Caledonian multi-racial identity within the framework of French political administration in which all groups have equal rights. As such, it has sought to reach out to voters from all ethnic groups on the island. The party also supports environmental efforts to promote biodiversity and mitigate climate change.

== See also ==
- List of political parties in New Caledonia
