= Vincent Descœur =

French politician

Vincent Descoeur
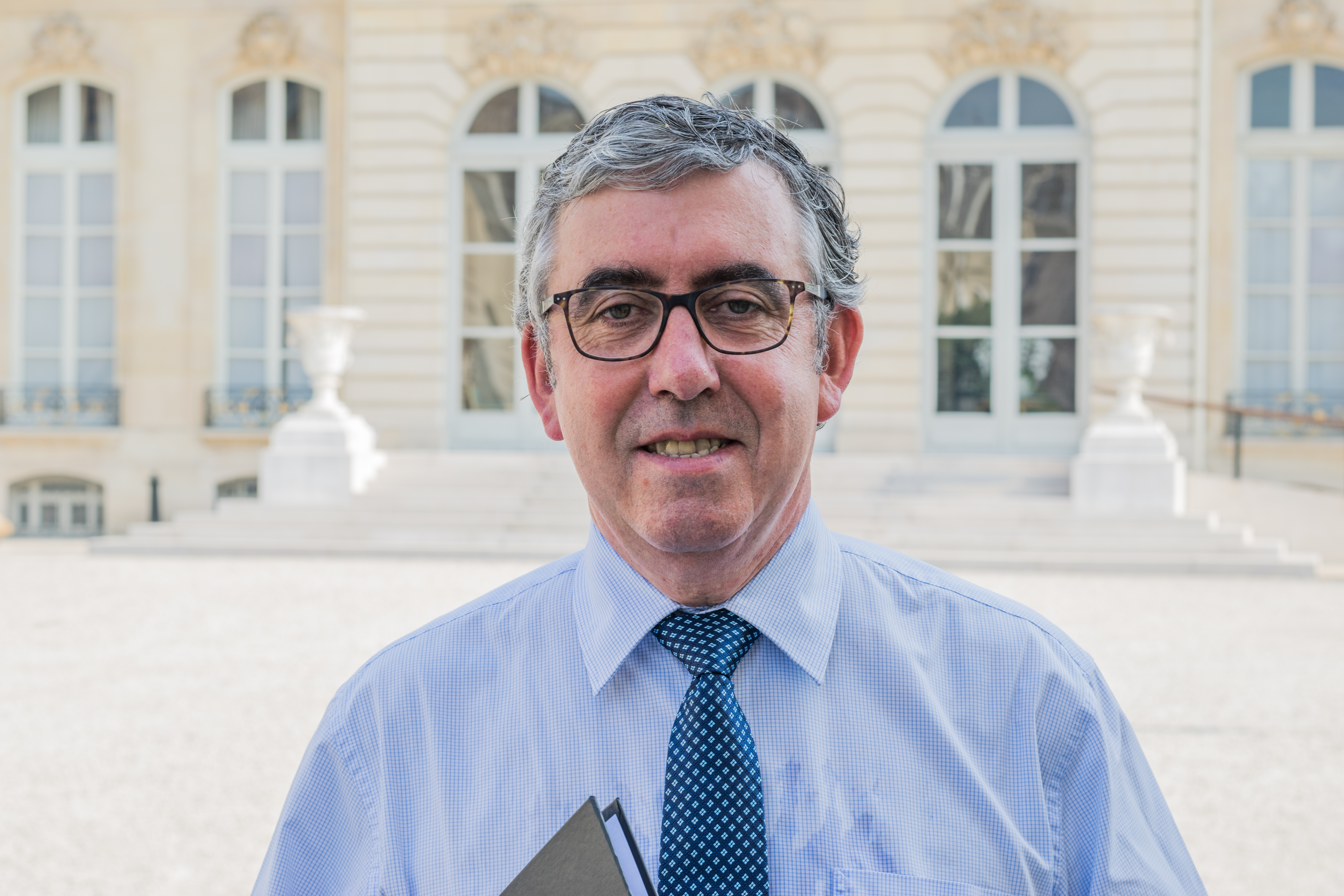
- Vincent Descoeur in 2017

Member of the National Assembly for Cantal's 1st constituency
- Incumbent
- Assumed office 21 June 2017
- Preceded by: Alain Calmette

Personal details
- Born: 13 December 1962 (age 63) Aurillac, France
- Party: The Republicans

Vincent Descoeur (born 13 December 1962, in Aurillac) is a member of the National Assembly of France. He represents the Cantal's 1st constituency, from 2007 to 2012 as a member of the Union for a Popular Movement and from 2017 as a member of the Republicans. He was a Cantal general councilor from 1987, and president of the Council from 2001 to 2017.

Ahead of the 2022 presidential elections, Descoeur publicly declared his support for Michel Barnier as the Republicans’ candidate.
