= Caledonia Together =

Political party in New Caledonia

Caledonia Together Calédonie ensemble
- Leader: Philippe Gomès
- General Secretary: Philip Michael
- Vice Presidents: Philippe Dunoyer; Gerard Poadja; Hélène Iekawé
- Founded: 11 October 2008
- Headquarters: 2 bis, Boulevard Vauban - Centre Ville, 98800 Nouméa
- Ideology: Anti-separatism; Liberalism; Liberal conservatism Christian democracy Environmentalism
- Political position: Centre to centre-right
- National affiliation: Union of Democrats and Independents
- Colors
- Seats in the National Assembly: 0 / 2 (0%)
- Seats in the Senate: 0 / 2 (0%)
- Seats in the Congress: 7 / 54 (13%)
- Seats in the South Province: 8 / 40 (20%)
- Seats in the North Province: 1 / 22 (5%)
- Seats in the Loyalty Islands Province: 0 / 14 (0%)

Website
- www.caledonieensemble.nc

Caledonia Together (French: Calédonie ensemble) is a political party in New Caledonia. The party was established on 14 October 2008 as a split from Future Together led by Philippe Gomès. The party is centrist and opposed to independence.

Future Together, a centrist party founded in 2004, split in 2008. The split started in the 2007 legislative election, when Gomès ran in New Caledonia's 1st constituency although Didier Leroux was supposed to run. Though both ran, and both polled 14%, respectively third and fourth, leaving the RPCR candidate Gaël Yanno against the candidate of the nationalist Kanak and Socialist National Liberation Front (FLINKS), which Yanno easily defeated. Martin was also defeated running the New Caledonia's 2nd constituency. Poor results in the 2008 local elections, including the capital, Nouméa, precipitated an open split between Gomès on one side and Martin-Leroux on the other. In 2008, Gomès and 12 Future Together Congressmen and women (including Thémereau) formed Caledonia Together.

In the 2014 provincial elections, the party placed first, along with the other 2 anti-independence parties winning 29 of 54 seats in congress, 13 of which for Caledonia Together.

== Electoral results ==
Congress of New Caledonia
Election year	Votes	%	Seats	+/–	Government
2009	16,253	16.83	10 / 54		Coalition government
2014	24,863	23.31	13 / 54	▲3	Coalition government
2019	15,948	14.48	7 / 54	▼8	Anti-separatist bloc
