= 2024 French legislative election in Indre-et-Loire =

Following the first round of the 2024 French legislative election on 30 June 2024, runoff elections in each constituency where no candidate received a vote share greater than 50 percent were scheduled for 7 July. Candidates permitted to stand in the runoff elections needed to either come in first or second place in the first round or achieve more than 12.5 percent of the votes of the entire electorate (as opposed to 12.5 percent of the vote share due to low turnout).

== Indre-et-Loire ==
=== 1st constituency ===
Candidate	Party or alliance		First round		Second round	
Candidate	Party or alliance		Votes	%	Votes	%
Charles Fournier	New Popular Front	The Ecologists	21,250	45.32	23,624	57.91
Benoist Pierre	Ensemble	Horizons	11,333	24.17	17,169	42.09
Lisa Garbay	National Rally		8,870	18.92		
Lucas Janer	The Republicans		2,774	5.92		
Alain Dayan	Miscellaneous left	Independent	1,690	3.60		
Arnaud Ossart	Reconquête		496	1.06		
Thomas Jouhannaud	Far-left	Lutte Ouvrière	473	1.01		
Total			46,886	100.00	40,793	100.00
Valid votes			46,886	98.28	40,793	91.67
Invalid votes			254	0.53	1,010	2.27
Blank votes			565	1.18	2,699	6.06
Total votes			47,705	100.00	44,502	100.00
Registered voters/turnout			71,964	66.29	71,989	61.82

=== 2nd constituency ===
Candidate	Party or alliance		First round		Second round	
Candidate	Party or alliance		Votes	%	Votes	%
Corine Fougeron	National Rally		22,396	35.08	24,906	40.01
Daniel Labaronne	Ensemble	Renaissance	20,801	32.58	37,343	59.99
Christelle Gobert	New Popular Front	La France Insoumise	14,891	23.33		
Maxime Maintier	The Republicans		4,123	6.46		
Anne Brunet	Far-left	Lutte Ouvrière	938	1.47		
Philippe Saintignan	Reconquête		688	1.08		
Total			63,837	100.00	62,249	100.00
Valid votes			63,837	97.21	62,249	94.93
Invalid votes			530	0.81	901	1.37
Blank votes			1,302	1.98	2,426	3.70
Total votes			65,669	100.00	65,576	100.00
Registered voters/turnout			93,120	70.52	93,139	70.41

=== 3rd constituency ===
Candidate	Party or alliance		First round		Second round	
Candidate	Party or alliance		Votes	%	Votes	%
Henri Alfandari	Ensemble	Horizons	22,174	32.87	41,028	62.24
Jules Robin	Union of the far right	The Republicans	21,724	32.21	24,896	37.76
Sandra Barbier	New Popular Front	La France Insoumise	17,240	25.56		
Emmanuel François	Independent	Miscellaneous right	3,248	4.82		
Christophe Legendre	Far-left	Lutte Ouvrière	1,060	1.57		
Amin Brimou	Independent	Miscellaneous centre	1,004	1.49		
Xavier Bourin	Reconquête		1,003	1.49		
Total			67,453	100.00	65,924	100.00
Valid votes			67,453	96.62	65,924	94.70
Invalid votes			729	1.04	919	1.32
Blank votes			1,633	2.34	2,767	3.98
Total votes			69,815	100.00	69,610	100.00
Registered voters/turnout			99,411	70.23	99,435	70.01

=== 4th constituency ===
Candidate	Party or alliance		First round		Second round	
Candidate	Party or alliance		Votes	%	Votes	%
Jean-François Bellanger	National Rally		20,328	32.89	24,615	42.59
Laurent Baumel	New Popular Front	Socialist Party	18,374	29.73	33,179	57.41
Fabienne Colboc	Ensemble	Renaissance	17,092	27.65		
Sophie Lagree	The Republicans		5,287	8.55		
Kevin Gardeau	Far-left	Lutte Ouvrière	731	1.18		
Total			61,812	100.00	57,794	100.00
Valid votes			61,812	97.36	57,794	90.84
Invalid votes			531	0.84	1,463	2.30
Blank votes			1,145	1.80	4,367	6.86
Total votes			63,488	100.00	63,624	100.00
Registered voters/turnout			92,734	68.46	92,739	68.61

=== 5th constituency ===
Candidate	Party or alliance		First round		Second round	
Candidate	Party or alliance		Votes	%	Votes	%
François Ducamp	National Rally		21,118	35.25	23,869	40.73
Sabine Thillaye	Ensemble	Democratic Movement	16,025	26.75	34,741	59.27
Marina Coccia	New Popular Front	Communist Party	14,457	24.13		
Constance Bales	The Republicans		6,805	11.36		
David Billon	Reconquête		809	1.35		
Christine Delarue	Far-left	Lutte Ouvrière	700	1.17		
Total			59,914	100.00	58,610	100.00
Valid votes			59,914	97.32	58,610	95.03
Invalid votes			483	0.78	907	1.47
Blank votes			1,165	1.89	2,160	3.50
Total votes			61,562	100.00	61,677	100.00
Registered voters/turnout			87,677	70.21	87,690	70.34
