= Michel Lezeau =

French politician (1942–2024)

Member of the National Assembly for Indre-et-Loire's 4th constituency
- In office 20 July 2007 – 14 December 2010
- Preceded by: Hervé Novelli
- Succeeded by: Hervé Novelli

Personal details
- Born: 20 December 1942 Orléans, France
- Died: 23 July 2024 (aged 81) Saint-Avertin, Indre-et-Loire, France
- Party: UMP

Michel Lezeau (20 December 1942 – 23 July 2024) was a French politician from Orléans. He was mayor of Ballan-Miré from 1977 until 2007, then became a member of the National Assembly of France for a four-year term. He represented the Indre-et-Loire department, as a member of the Union for a Popular Movement. Lezeau died on 23 July 2024 aged 81.
