= European Affairs Committee =

Committee of the French National Assembly

Committee for European Affairs
- 16th legislature
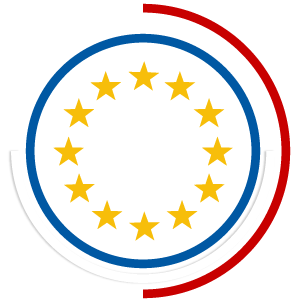

Leadership
- Chair: Pieyre-Alexandre Anglade, RE since 7 July 2022
- Seats: 71

The European Affairs Committee is a committee of the French National Assembly.

== Jurisdiction ==
The commission has competence in the field of the European Union and monitors the work carried out by the various Institutions of the European Union. It examines bills and proposals for laws relating to the European Union and transmits this work to the other committees.

== History ==
In 2019, Pieyre-Alexandre Anglade was elected as the committee's chairman; however, due to disagreements with incumbent chairwoman Sabine Thillaye who refused to accept the legality of the vote, he did not take office.

== List of chairmen ==
Portrait	Name	Constituency	Took office	Left office	Political party	Legislature
	Pierre Lequiller	Yvelines's 4th constituency	September 18, 2008	June 28, 2012	UMP	13th legislature
	Danielle Auroi	Puy-de-Dôme's 3rd constituency	June 28, 2012	June 20, 2017	EELV	14th legislature
	Sabine Thillaye	Indre-et-Loire's 5th constituency	June 29, 2017	June 21, 2022	LREM	15th legislature
	Pieyre-Alexandre Anglade	French residents overseas's 4th constituency	June 30, 2022	Incumbent	RE	16th legislature

== Current Bureau's Committee ==
Composition of the bureau
Post	Name	Constituency	Group
Chairman	Pieyre-Alexandre Anglade	French residents overseas's 4th constituency	RE
Vice-chair	Pierre-Henri Dumont	Pas-de-Calais's 7th constituency	LR
Vice-chair	Marietta Karamanli	Sarthe's 2nd constituency	SOC
Vice-chair	Frédéric Petit	French residents overseas's 7th constituency	DEM
Vice-chair	Charles Sitzenstuhl	Bas-Rhin's 5th constituency	RE
Secretary	Henri Alfandari	Indre-et-Loire's 3rd constituency	HOR
Secretary	Louise Morel	Bas-Rhin's 6th constituency	DEM
Secretary	Nathalie Oziol	Hérault's 2nd constituency	LFI
Secretary	Sandra Regol	Bas-Rhin's 1st constituency	ECO

== See also ==
- European Scrutiny Committee (United Kingdom)
