= Departmental Council of Indre-et-Loire =

Departmental legislature in France

Departmental Council of Indre-et-Loire Conseil départemental d'Indre-et-Loire

Leadership
- President: Nadège Arnault, DVD since 18 October 2023

Meeting place
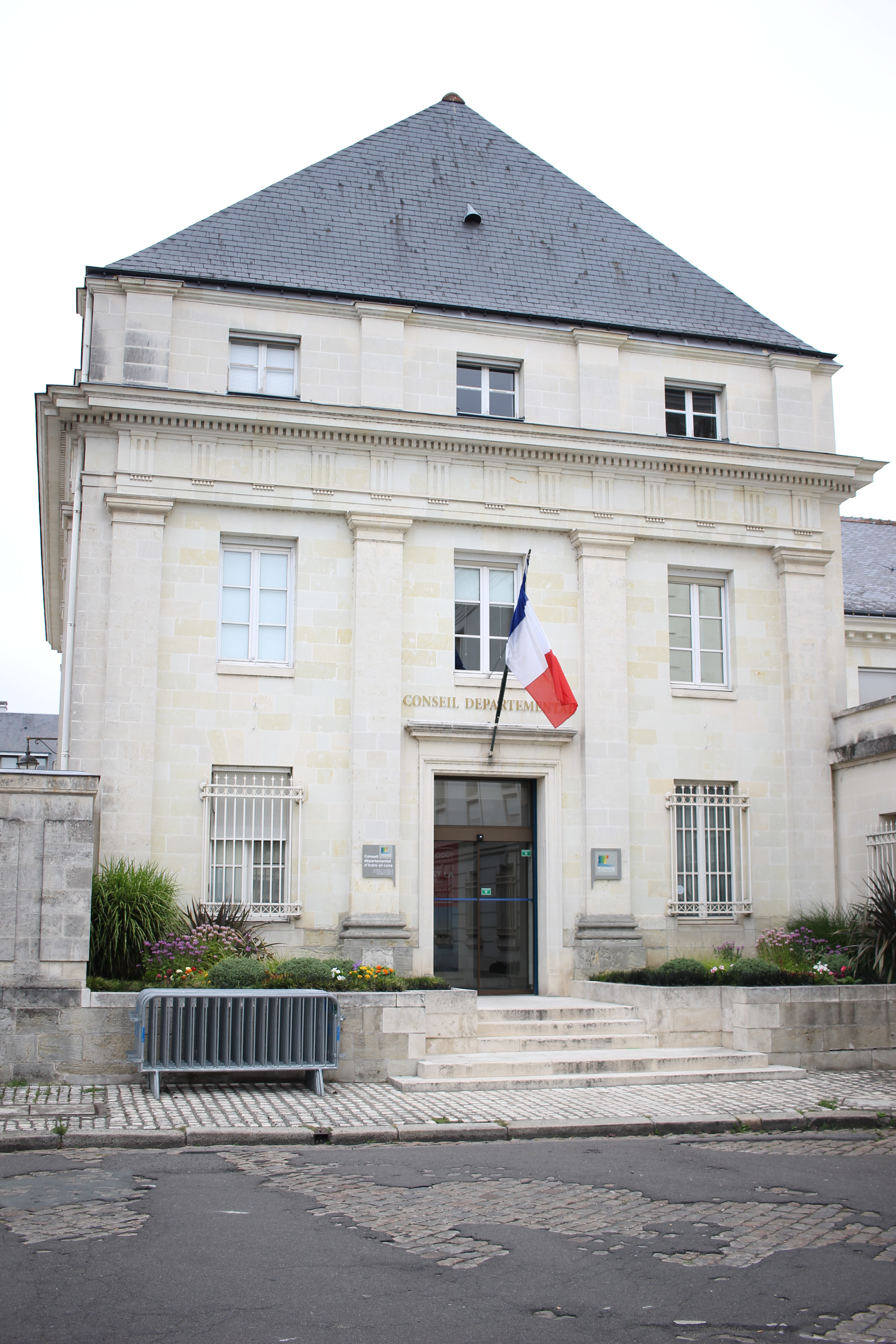
- Conseil départemental, Tours

The Departmental Council of Indre-et-Loire (French: Conseil départemental d'Indre-et-Loire) is the deliberative assembly of the French department of Indre-et-Loire. It sits in Tours.

Results of the 2021 departmental elections by canton in Indre-et-Loire

The council includes 38 departmental councilors elected from the 19 cantons of Indre-et-Loire.

== Executive ==
=== President ===
Following the 2021 departmental elections, Jean-Gérard Paumier assumed the role of president of the departmental council. However, after securing a seat in the 2023 French Senate election, he stepped down from his position. Nadège Arnault was then elected president after winning an internal vote against Sabrina Hamedi.

=== Vice-presidents ===
In addition to the president, the executive has 11 vice-presidents.

Vice-presidents of the Departmental Council of Indre-et-Loire (since 2021)
Order	Name	Canton (constituency)	Delegation
1st	Cédric de Oliveira	Saint-Cyr-sur-Loire	Finance and commission
2nd	Pascale Devallée	Vouvray	Social action, integration policies, housing policies, and social and solidarity economy
3rd	Olivier Lebreton	Tours-3	Human resources, sports, community life, and historical remembrance
4th	Valérie Gervès	Loches	Ecological transition and biodiversity
5th	Judicaël Osmond	Joué-lès-Tours	Colleges, education, and youth
6th	Sylvie Giner	Monts	Culture and digital planning
7th	Patrick Michaud	Monts	Road infrastructure, school transport for disabled students, and mobility
8th	Valérie Jabot	Saint-Cyr-sur-Loire	Preventive child welfare and protection
9th	Alain Anceau	Château-Renault	Agricultural support, nutritional policy, and departmental buildings
10th	Cécile Chevillard	Tours-1	Personal autonomy, elderly, and people with disabilities
11th	Etienne Martegoutte	Sainte-Maure-de-Touraine	Tourism development, museums, and departmental monuments
