= Jean-Michel Testu =

French politician (1937–2026)

Deputy of the French National Assembly
- In office 23 June 1988 – 1 April 1993
- Preceded by: constituency established
- Succeeded by: Philippe Briand
- Constituency: Indre-et-Loire's 5th constituency
- In office 2 July 1981 – 1 April 1986
- Preceded by: Jean Delaneau
- Succeeded by: Bernard Debré (1988)
- Constituency: Indre-et-Loire's 2nd constituency

Member of the General Council of Indre-et-Loire for the Canton of Tours-Nord-Ouest
- In office 1982–1985
- Succeeded by: Michel Montaubin

Personal details
- Born: 7 May 1937 Auzouer-en-Touraine, France
- Died: 1 April 2026 (aged 88) Vouvray, France
- Party: PS
- Occupation: Teacher

Jean-Michel Testu (French: [ʒˈɑ̃-miʃˈɛl tɛstˈy]; 7 May 1937 – 1 April 2026) was a French politician of the Socialist Party (PS).

Testu served two terms in the National Assembly; from 1981 to 1986 and from 1988 to 1993.

Testu died in Vouvray on 1 April 2026, at the age of 88.
