= Cantons of the Indre-et-Loire department =

The following is a list of the 19 cantons of the Indre-et-Loire department, in France, following the French canton reorganisation which came into effect in March 2015:

- Amboise
- Ballan-Miré
- Bléré
- Château-Renault
- Chinon
- Descartes
- Joué-lès-Tours
- Langeais
- Loches
- Montlouis-sur-Loire
- Monts
- Saint-Cyr-sur-Loire
- Sainte-Maure-de-Touraine
- Saint-Pierre-des-Corps
- Tours-1
- Tours-2
- Tours-3
- Tours-4
- Vouvray
