= Hervé Novelli =

French politician (born 1949)

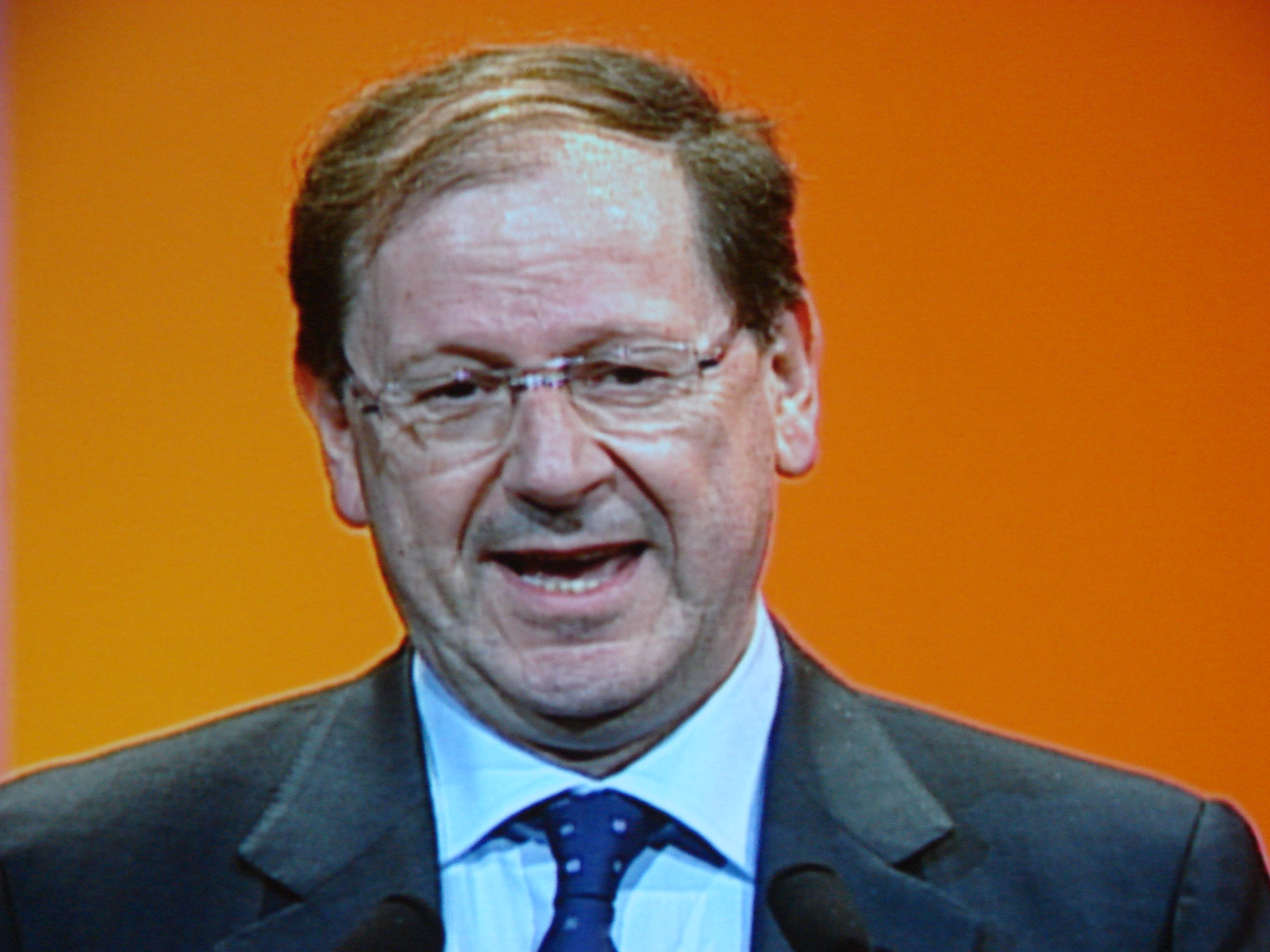
- Hervé Novelli in 2009

Member of the National Assembly for Indre-et-Loire's 4th constituency
- In office 14 December 2010 – 19 June 2012
- Preceded by: Michel Lezeau
- Succeeded by: Laurent Baumel

Secretary of State for Business and Foreign Trade
- In office 18 June 2007 – 18 March 2008
- President: Nicolas Sarkozy
- Prime Minister: François Fillon
- Preceded by: Christine Lagarde
- Succeeded by: Anne-Marie Idrac

Personal details
- Born: 6 March 1949 (age 77) Paris, France
- Party: UDF
- Education: Paris Dauphine University

Hervé Novelli (born 6 March 1949) is a French politician of Italian origin, and a past member of the UDF group. He was a deputé in the Assemblée Nationale for the Indre-et-Loire département from 2002 to 2007, having previously been a député from 1993–1997. He has also served as a member of the European Parliament from 1999 to 2002 and as vice-president of the Indre-et-Loire local government (conseil général) from 1998 to 2001. He is also mayor of Richelieu since 2001. In June 2007, he became a member of the cabinet of Nicolas Sarkozy as an undersecretary for business and foreign trade (secrétaire d’Etat chargé des Entreprises et du Commerce extérieur). He was from March 2008 to 13 November 2010 an undersecretary for commerce, craftsmanship, small and medium businesses, tourism and services (secrétaire d’Etat chargé du commerce, de l’artisanat, des petites et moyennes entreprises, du tourisme et des services) in the cabinet of Nicolas Sarkozy. In March 2006, he has created the association Les Réformateurs.

His political history is that of a conservative politician moving to the centre ground. He was, from the 1960s to 1980s a member of various extreme right parties including Occident, the Parti des forces nouvelles, the National Front, etc., before joining the conservative National Centre of Independents and Peasants and then the centrist Parti Républicain, a component of UDF. He was general secretary from 1990 to 1993, then a member of the bureau exécutif of the Parti Républicain.

Professionally, he was CEO of établissements Janton, from 1982 to 2006, and chargé de mission for the French steel industry (Chargé de mission pour la chambre syndicale de la sidérurgie française) from 1977 to 1986.

== Political career ==
Governmental functions

Secretary of State for Trade, Crafts, Small and Medium Enterprises, Tourism, Services and Consumer : 2009–2010.

Secretary of State for Business and Foreign Trade : 2007–2009.

Electoral mandates

European Parliament

Member of European Parliament : 1999–2002 (Resignation, reelected in the National Assembly in 2002).

National Assembly of France

Member of the National Assembly of France for Indre-et-Loire (4th constituency) : 1993–1997 / 2002–2007 (Became Secretary of State in 2007) / 2010–2012 (He lost his reelection). Elected in 1993, reelected in 2002, 2007.

Regional Council

Regional councillor of Centre (région) : 2004–2007 (Resignation) / Since 2010. Reelected in 2010.

General Council

Vice-president of the General Council of Indre-et-Loire : 1998–2001 (Resignation).

General councillor of Indre-et-Loire : 1997–2001 (Resignation).

Municipal Council

Mayor of Richelieu, Indre-et-Loire : Since 2008.

Deputy-mayor of Richelieu, Indre-et-Loire : 2001–2008.

Municipal councillor of Richelieu, Indre-et-Loire : Since 2001. Reelected in 2008.

Municipal councillor of Joué-lès-Tours : 1995–2001.

Community of communes Council

President of Communauté de communes du pays de Richelieu : Since 2001. Reelected in 2008.

Member of Communauté de communes du pays de Richelieu : Since 2001. Reelected in 2008.

== Bibliography ==
- Frédéric Charpier, Génération Occident (Paris: Le Seuil, 2005) ISBN 978-2-02-061413-9
