= Claude Greff =

French politician

Member of the Regional Council of Centre-Val de Loire
- Incumbent
- Assumed office 18 December 2015
- President: François Bonneau
- In office 2 April 2004 – 14 March 2010
- President: Michel Sapin

Member of the National Assembly for Indre-et-Loire's 2nd constituency
- In office 20 June 2012 – 20 June 2017
- Preceded by: Raymond Lancelin
- Succeeded by: Daniel Labaronne

Secretary of State in charge of Family
- In office 29 June 2011 – 10 May 2012
- President: Nicolas Sarkozy
- Prime Minister: François Fillon
- Preceded by: Nadine Morano
- Succeeded by: Dominique Bertinotti

Personal details
- Born: 2 June 1954 (age 71) Briey, Meurthe-et-Moselle, France
- Party: UMP

Claude Greff (French pronunciation: [klod ɡʁɛf]; born 2 June 1954) was a member of the National Assembly of France from 2002 to 2017. She represented the 2nd constituency of the Indre-et-Loire department, as a member of the Union for a Popular Movement.
