= Indre-et-Loire's 4th constituency =

Constituency of the National Assembly of France

4th constituency of Indre-et-Loire
- inline Constituency of the National Assembly of France

- Constituency in Department

- Location of Indre-et-Loire in France
- Deputy: Laurent Baumel; PS
- Department: Indre-et-Loire

The 4th constituency of Indre-et-Loire is one of five French legislative constituencies in the Indre-et-Loire département.

It consists of the following cantons; Ballan-Miré, Chinon, Joué-lès-Tours, Sainte-Maure-de-Touraine.

== Deputies ==
Election	Member	Party
1988	Jean Proveux	PS
1993	Hervé Novelli	UDF
1997	Yves Dauge	PS
2002	Hervé Novelli	UMP
2007	Hervé Novelli	UMP
2012	Laurent Baumel	PS
2017	Fabienne Colboc	LREM
2022	Fabienne Colboc	RE
2024	Laurent Baumel	PS

== Election results ==
=== 2024 ===
Candidate	Party	Alliance	First round			Second round		
Candidate	Party	Alliance	Votes	%	+/–	Votes	%	+/–
Jean-François Bellanger	RN		20,328	32.89	+13.04	24,615	42.59	new
Laurent Baumel	PS	NFP	18,374	29.73	+0.18	33,179	57.41	+7.93
Fabienne Colboc	REN	Ensemble	17,092	27.65	-2.34	withdrew		
Sophie Lagrée	LR	UDC	5,287	8.55	-1.00			
Kévin Gardeau	LO		731	1.18	-0.07			
Votes			61,812	100.00		57,794	100.00	
Valid votes			61,812	97.36	-0.44	57,794	90.84	-1.73
Blank votes			1,145	1.80	+0.28	4,367	6.86	+1.70
Null votes			531	0.84	+0.16	1,463	2.30	+0.03
Turnout			63,488	68.46	+17.99	63,624	68.61	+19.54
Abstentions			29,246	31.54	-17.99	1,463	2.30	-19.54
Registered voters			92,734			92,739		
Result			PS GAIN FROM RE					

=== 2022 ===
Legislative Election 2022: Indre-et-Loire's 4th constituency
Party	Candidate	Votes	%	±%
LREM (Ensemble)	Fabienne Colboc	13,666	29.99	-4.40
PS (NUPÉS)	Laurent Baumel	13,461	29.55	-3.20
RN	Jean-François Bellanger	9,044	19.85	+10.47
LR (UDC)	Sophie Lagrée	4,349	9.55	−8.39
REC	Olivier De La Ferté	1,907	4.19	N/A
DVE	Caroline Deforge	1,848	4.06	N/A
Others	N/A	1,286	-	−
Turnout		45,561	50.47	−1.06
2nd round result
LREM (Ensemble)	Fabienne Colboc	21,185	50.52	-7.74
PS (NUPÉS)	Laurent Baumel	20,752	49.48	N/A
Turnout		41,937	49.07	+4.13
LREM hold				

=== 2017 ===
Candidate	Label	First round		Second round	
Candidate	Label	Votes	%	Votes	%
Fabienne Colboc	REM	15,618	34.39	19,995	58.26
Hervé Novelli	LR	8,100	17.84	14,327	41.74
Laurent Baumel	PS	7,404	16.30		
Nadia Vezin	FI	5,209	11.47		
Véronique Péan	FN	4,260	9.38		
Michel Gendron	ECO	1,616	3.56		
Véronique Valin	DLF	1,147	2.53		
Geoffroy de Vries	DVD	741	1.63		
Sophie Hervé	PCF	645	1.42		
Jean-Jacques Prodhomme	EXG	425	0.94		
Kemaïs Marzouk	DIV	251	0.55		
Pierre Polier	DVD	0	0.00		
Votes		45,416	100.00	34,322	100.00
Valid votes		45,416	97.79	34,322	86.67
Blank votes		717	1.54	3,873	9.78
Null votes		308	0.66	1,406	3.55
Turnout		46,441	51.53	39,601	43.94
Abstentions		43,688	48.47	50,529	56.06
Registered voters		90,129		90,130	
Source: Ministry of the Interior

=== 2012 ===
2012 legislative election in Indre-Et-Loire's 4th constituency
Candidate	Party	First round		Second round	
Candidate	Party	Votes	%	Votes	%
Laurent Baumel	PS	20,673	39.65%	27,657	53.39%
Hervé Novelli	UMP	18,737	35.93%	24,143	46.61%
Emilie Thelot	FN	5,943	11.40%		
Patrick Fresne	FG	2,490	4.78%		
Gilles Descroix	EELV	1,314	2.52%		
Philippe Oliveira	MoDem	1,108	2.12%		
Nathalie Christiaens	??	460	0.88%		
Jacqueline Levy	DLR	384	0.74%		
Jean-Jacques Prodhomme	LO	338	0.65%		
Sylvain Fauvinet	NPA	225	0.43%		
Jean Lerbet	AEI	218	0.42%		
Cécile Evano	POI	200	0.38%		
Joël Bernard	AR	54	0.10%		
Valid votes		52,144	98.48%	51,800	97.21%
Spoilt and null votes		804	1.52%	1,489	2.79%
Votes cast / turnout		52,948	59.96%	53,289	60.34%
Abstentions		35,358	40.04%	35,023	39.66%
Registered voters		88,306	100.00%	88,312	100.00%

=== 2007 ===
Legislative Election 1997: Indre-et-Loire's 4th constituency
Party	Candidate	Votes	%	±%
UMP	Hervé Novelli	23,564	44.24	+10.95
PS	Philippe Le Breton	16,397	30.79	−0.22
MoDem	Jean-Luc Navard	4,277	8.03	N/A
FN	Armelle Gantier	2,147	4.03	−4.66
LV	Marie-Claire Robin	1,278	2.40	−0.01
LCR	Marie-Paule Collard-Bouteiller	1,268	2.38	+0.81
PCF	Jean-Marie Lepezel	1,094	2.05	−0.36
Others	N/A	3,234	-	−
Turnout		54,109	62.62	−1.63
Registered electors		86,403		
2nd round result
UMP	Hervé Novelli	27,157	52.56	−1.11
PS	Philippe Le Breton	24,514	47.44	+1.11
Turnout		53,111	61.47	+0.08
Registered electors		86,402		
UMP hold				

=== 2002 ===
Legislative Election 2002: Indre-et-Loire's 4th constituency
Party	Candidate	Votes	%	±%
UMP	Hervé Novelli	17,149	33.29	N/A
PS	Philippe Le Breton	15,976	31.01	+1.47
FN	Armelle Gantier	4,479	8.69	−4.64
DVD	François Blanchecotte	3,860	7.49	N/A
DVD	Mercellin Sigonneau	3,382	6.56	N/A
LV	Alain Pachet	1,242	2.41	−1.37
PCF	Jean-Marie Lepezel	1,237	2.40	−3.85
Others	N/A	4,194	-	−
Turnout		52,769	64.25	−3.07
Registered electors		82,137		
2nd round result
UMP	Hervé Novelli	26,067	53.67	N/A
PS	Philippe Le Breton	22,503	46.33	−4.52
Turnout		50,421	61.39	−10.34
Registered electors		82,131		
UMP gain from PS				

=== 1997 ===
Legislative Election 1997: Indre-et-Loire's 4th constituency
Party	Candidate	Votes	%	±%
PR (UDF)	Hervé Novelli	16,457	32.66	-1.92
PS	Yves Dauge	14,884	29.54	+6.21
FN	Agnès Belbeoch	6,715	13.33	+2.33
PCF	Jean-Marie Lepezel	3,147	6.25	+1.76
LO	Jean-Jacques Prodhomme	2,212	4.39	+1.00
LDI	Henri Gaulandeau	2,132	4.23	N/A
LV	Monique Chevet	1,905	3.78	−3.37
GE	Josselin de Lespinay	1,550	3.08	N/A
MDC	Francis Gérard	1,385	2.75	N/A
Turnout		53,431	67.32	−1.27
Registered electors		79,368		
2nd round result
PS	Yves Dauge	27,325	50.85	+6.32
PR (UDF)	Hervé Novelli	26,415	49.15	−6.32
Turnout		56,934	71.73	+2.75
Registered electors		79,373		
PS gain from PR				

=== 1993 ===
Legislative Election 1993: Indre-et-Loire's 4th constituency
Party	Candidate	Votes	%	±%
UDF	Hervé Novelli	17,586	34.58	
PS	Jean Proveux	11,867	23.33	
DVD	Marcellin Sigonneau	6,122	12.04	
FN	Agnes Belbeoch	5,597	11.00	
LV	Alain Pachet	3,638	7.15	
PCF	Jean-Michel Bodin	2,282	4.49	
LO	Jean-Jacques Prodhomme	1,724	3.39	
DIV	Bernadette Dugue	1,569	3.08	
DIV	Clement Roubaud	474	0.93	
Turnout		50,859	68.59	
Registered electors		78,532		
2nd round result
UDF	Hervé Novelli	27,980	55.47	
PS	Jean Proveux	22,464	44.53	
Turnout		54,169	68.98	
Registered electors		78,528		
UDF gain from PS				
