= Philippe Briand =

French politician

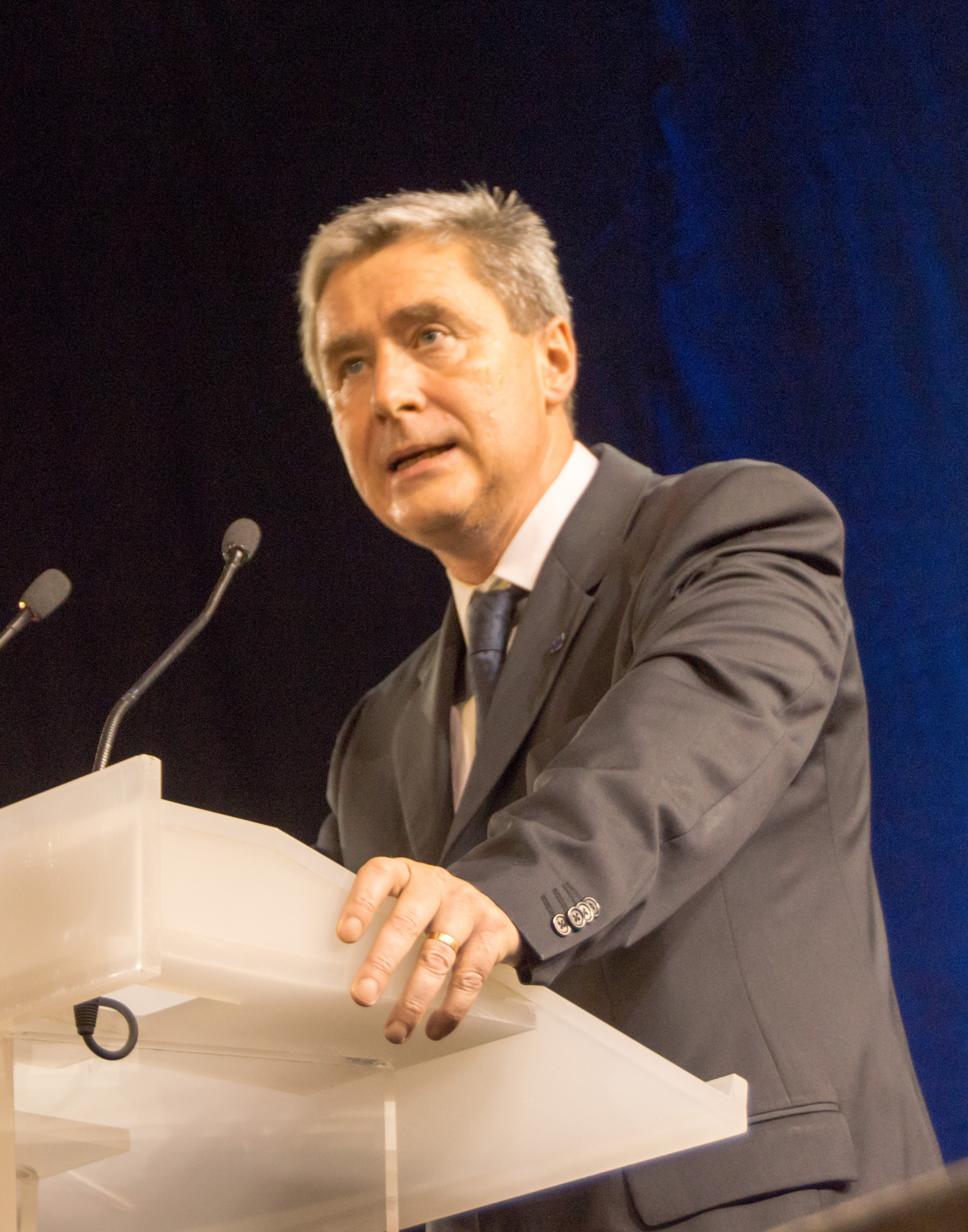
- Briand in 2014

Mayor of Saint-Cyr-sur-Loire
- Incumbent
- Assumed office 20 March 1989
- Preceded by: Guy Raynaud

Member of the National Assembly for Indre-et-Loire's 5th constituency
- In office 1993–2017
- Preceded by: Jean-Michel Testu
- Succeeded by: Sabine Thillaye

Personal details
- Born: 26 October 1960 (age 65) Tours, France
- Party: The Republicans

Philippe Briand (born 26 October 1960 in Tours) was a member of the National Assembly of France. He represented the Indre-et-Loire department, as a member of The Republicans.
