= Canton of Saint-Pierre-des-Corps =

Coordinates: 47.39°N 0.73°E

The canton of Saint-Pierre-des-Corps is an administrative division of the Indre-et-Loire department, central France. Its borders were modified at the French canton reorganisation which came into effect in March 2015. Its seat is in Saint-Pierre-des-Corps.

It consists of the following communes:

1. Saint-Avertin
2. Saint-Pierre-des-Corps
