= Fabienne Colboc =

French politician (born 1971)

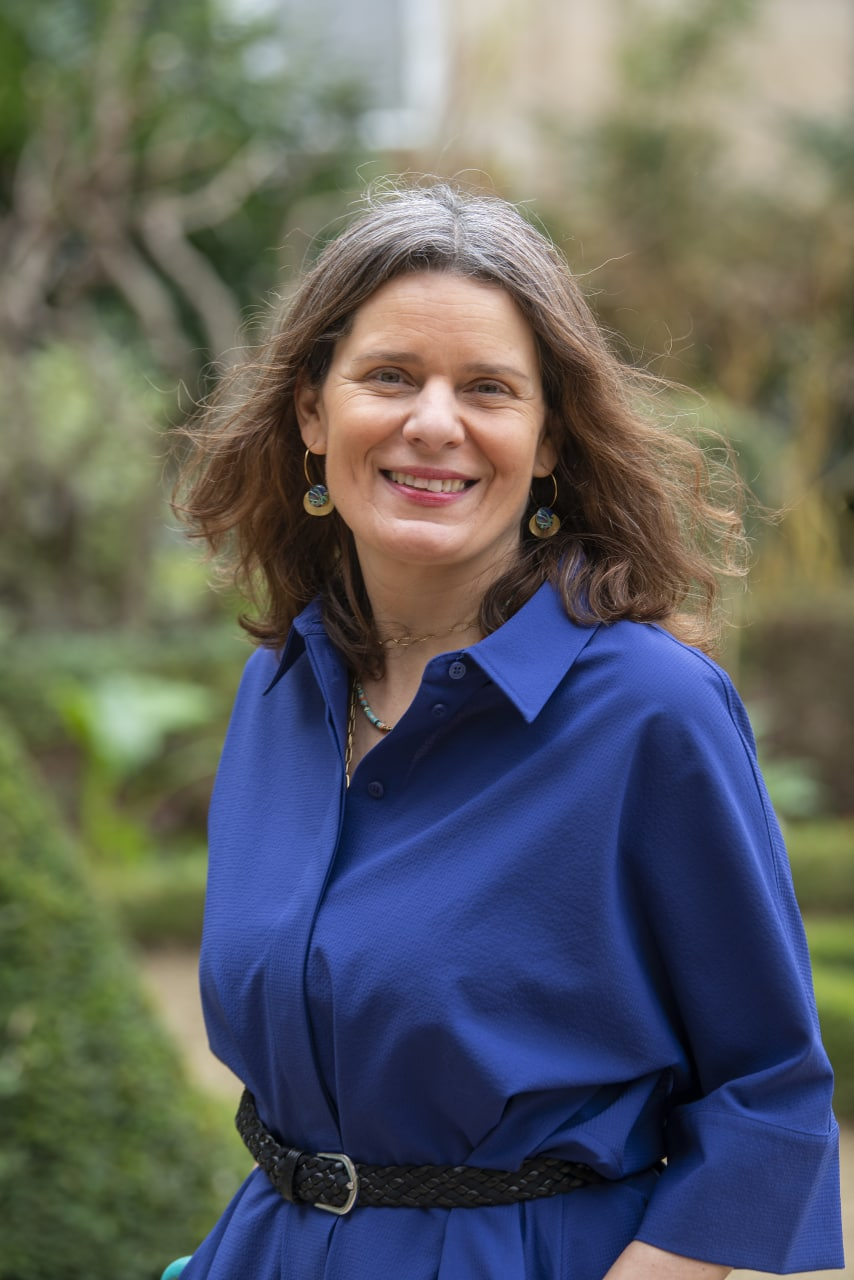

Member of the National Assembly for Indre-et-Loire 's 4th constituency
- Incumbent
- Assumed office 21 June 2017
- Preceded by: Laurent Baumel

Personal details
- Born: 9 August 1971 (age 54) Thiais, Val-de-Marne, France
- Party: Renaissance

Fabienne Colboc (born 9 August 1971) is a French politician representing La République En Marche!. She was elected to the French National Assembly on 18 June 2017, representing the department of Indre-et-Loire.

== Early life and career ==
Colboc holds a degree in sociology and also runs a professional coaching business.

== Political career ==
In parliament, Colboc serves on the Committee on Cultural Affairs and Education. In addition to her committee assignments, she is part of the French-Portuguese Parliamentary Friendship Group.

In July 2019, Colboc decided not to align with her parliamentary group's majority and became one of 52 LREM members who abstained from a vote on the French ratification of the European Union’s Comprehensive Economic and Trade Agreement (CETA) with Canada.
