= Marie-Anne Montchamp =

French politician (born 1957)

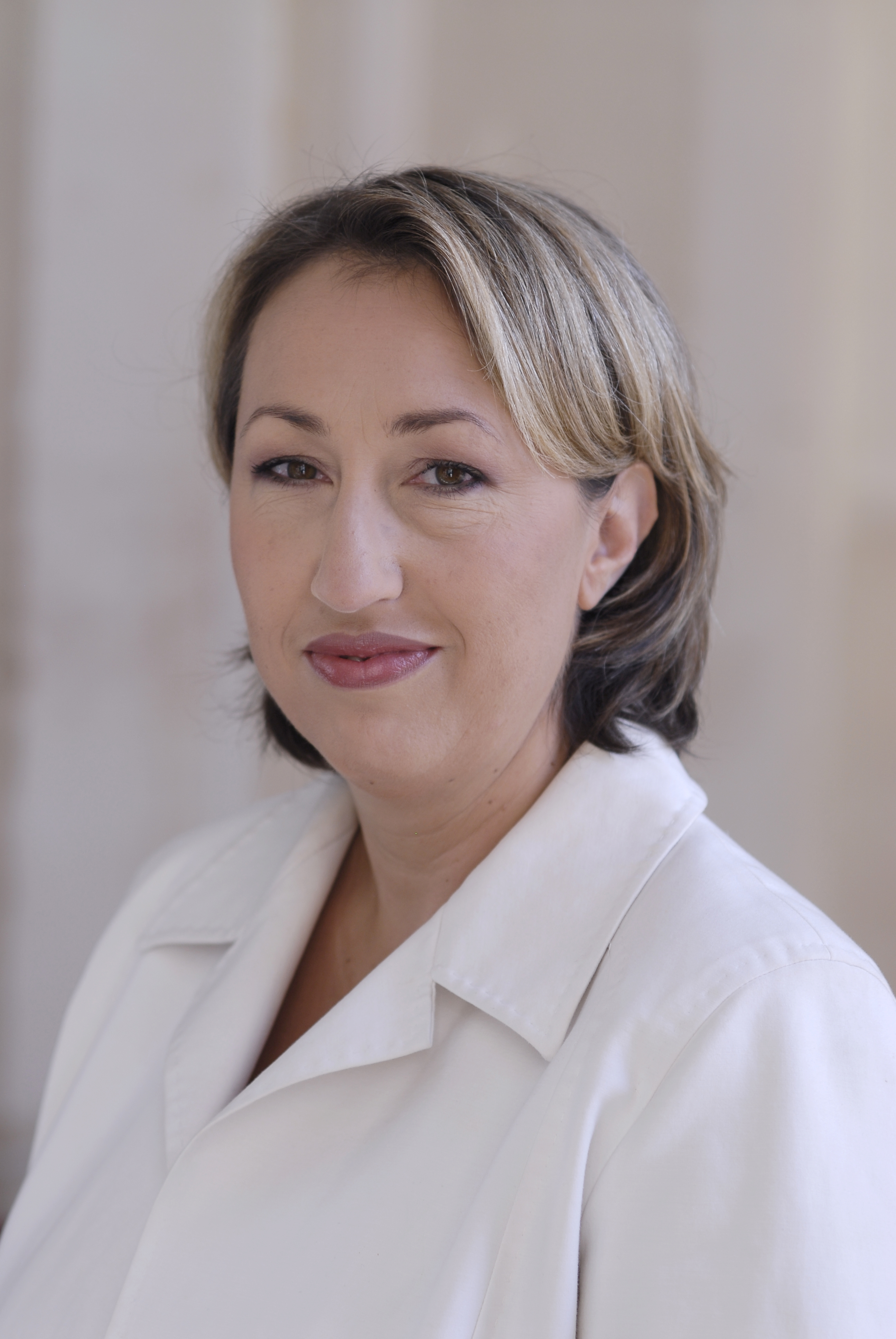

Secretary of State for Solidarity
- In office 2010–2012
- President: Nicolas Sarkozy
- Prime Minister: François Fillon

Secretary of State for Disabled people
- In office 2004–2005
- President: Jacques Chirac
- Prime Minister: Jean-Pierre Raffarin
- Preceded by: Marie-Thérèse Boisseau
- Succeeded by: Philippe Bas

Member of the National Assembly for Val-de-Marne's 7th constituency
- In office 2005–2010
- Preceded by: Olivier Dosne
- Succeeded by: Olivier Dosne

Personal details
- Born: 1 November 1957 (age 68) Tulle, France
- Party: LR (2015-2017); LREM (since 2017)

Marie-Anne Montchamp (born 1 November 1957) is a French politician who served as a member of the National Assembly, represents a constituency in the Val-de-Marne department. From 2010 to 2012, she served as Secretary of State for Solidarities and Social Cohesion under Minister Roselyne Bachelot-Narquin.

== Political career ==
In parliament, Montchamp served on the Committee on Economic Affairs and the Environment (2005–2007) and the Finance Committee (2002–2004, 2007–2010).

When President Nicolas Sarkozy was first publicly confronted with evidence in 2010 that his party received illegal campaign donations in cash from heiress Liliane Bettencourt via Labour Minister Éric Woerth as part of a vast system of patronage, Montchamp publicly urged the president to bring forward a reshuffle.

Montchamp was the party's candidate for the Fourth constituency for French residents overseas in the June 2012 legislative election.

In March 2017, Montchamp announced that she was leaving the Republicans (LR) to join presidential candidate Emmanuel Macron and his movement La République En Marche! (LREM).

== Later career ==
In 2017, Montchamp was appointed by Minister of Solidarity and Health Agnès Buzyn and the Secretary of State for the Disabled Sophie Cluzel to the Board of Directors of the National Solidarity Fund for Autonomy (CNSA).
