= Pieyre-Alexandre Anglade =

French politician (born 1986)

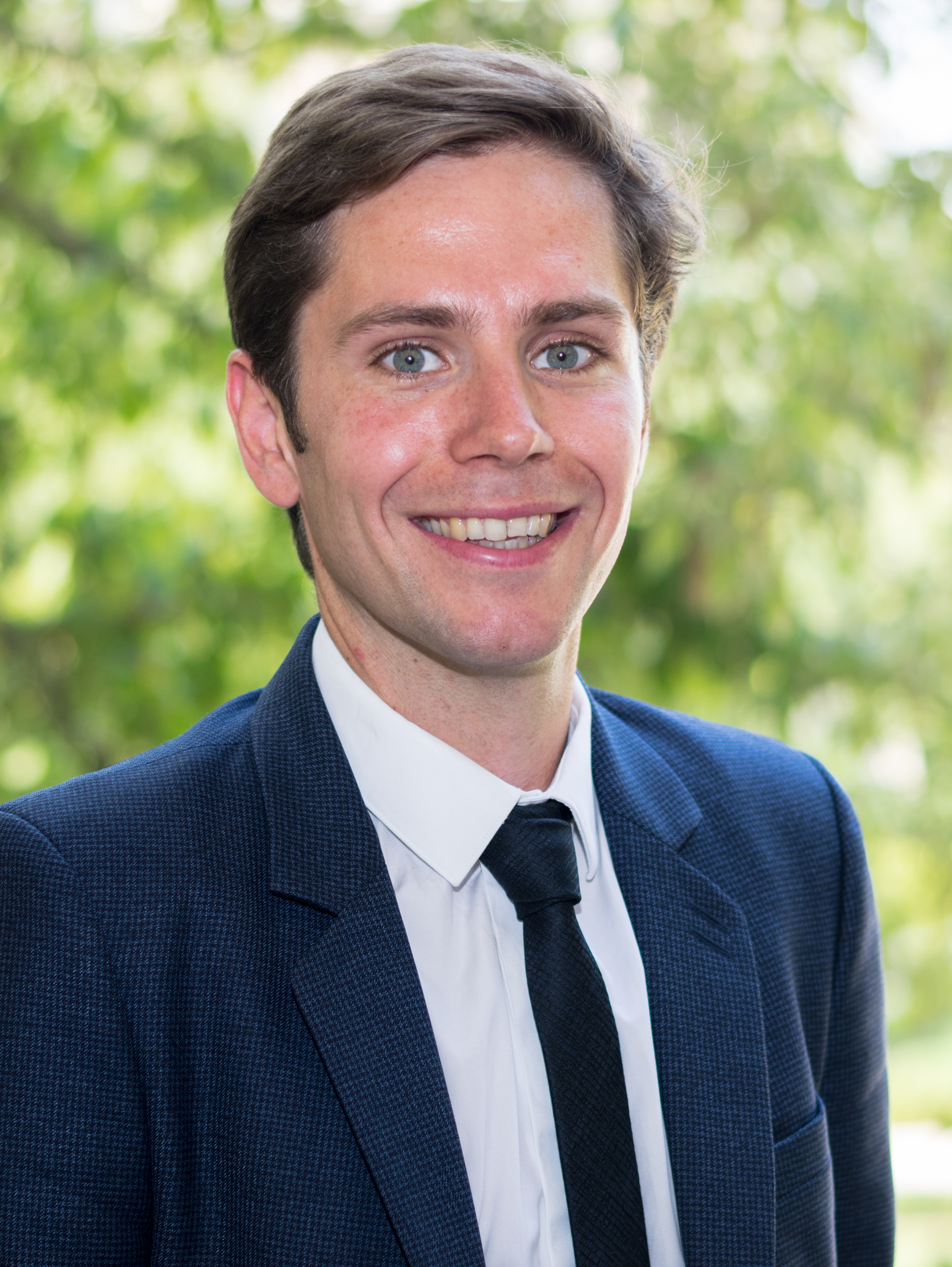

Member of the National Assembly for the 4th constituency for French residents overseas
- Incumbent
- Assumed office 21 June 2017
- Preceded by: Philip Cordery

Personal details
- Born: 2 November 1986 (age 39) Paris, France
- Party: Renaissance (2016–present)
- Education: Sorbonne; Institut d'études politiques de Strasbourg

Pieyre-Alexandre Anglade (French pronunciation: [pjɛʁalɛksɑ̃dʁ ɑ̃ɡlad]; born 2 November 1986) is a French politician who has represented the fourth constituency for French residents overseas in the National Assembly since 2017. A member of Renaissance (RE, formerly La République En Marche!), his constituency comprises the Benelux (Belgium, the Netherlands and Luxembourg). Since 2022, he has presided over the European Affairs Committee in the National Assembly.

== Early life and education ==
Born in Paris, Anglade was raised by a divorced mother in a Paris suburb. He graduated from the Sorbonne and the Institut d'études politiques de Strasbourg (IEP de Strasbourg).

== Political career ==
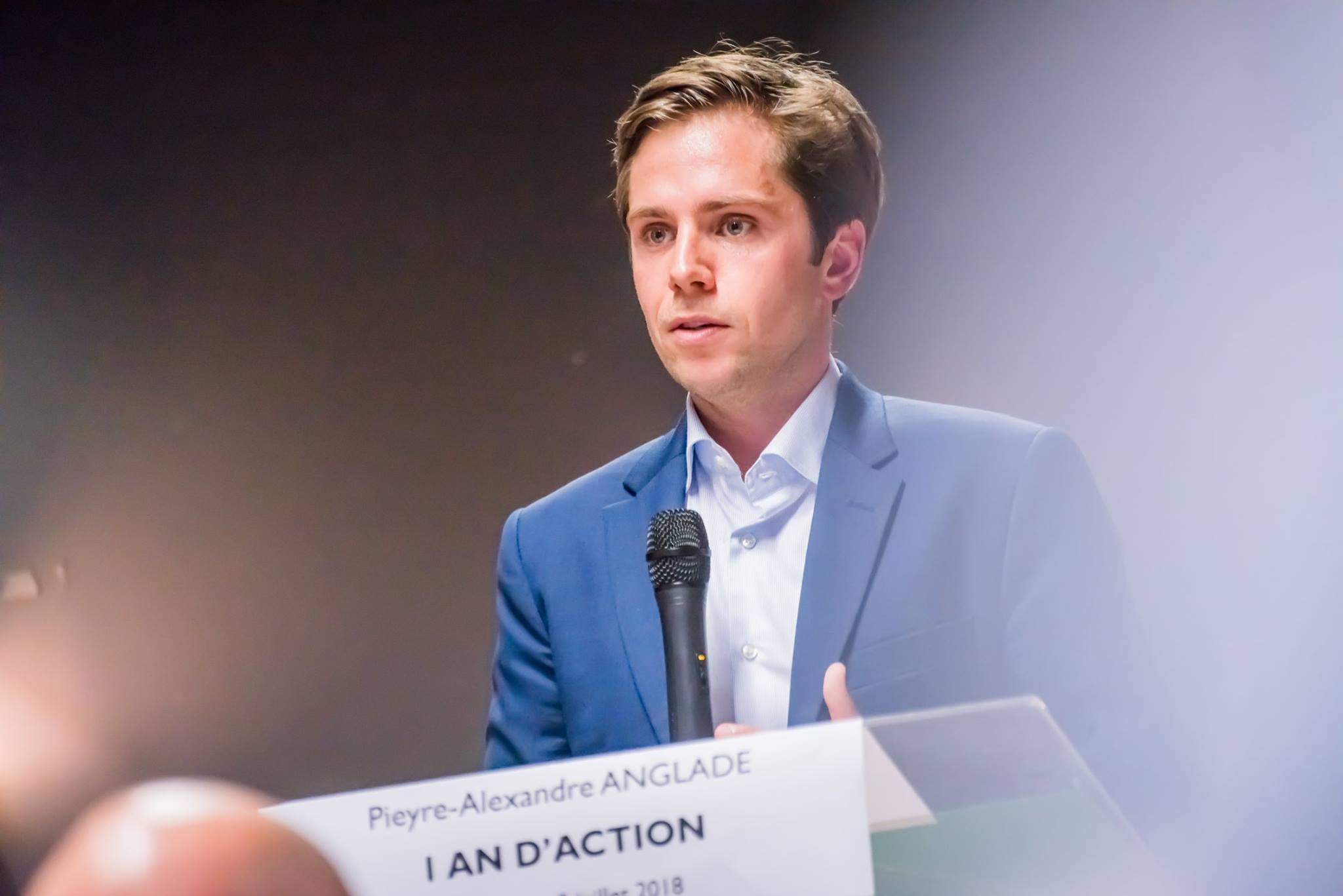
Anglade in 2018

Anglade joined LREM in 2016. When Macron launched his bid for the presidency in November 2016, Anglade was a parliamentary assistant and political adviser, who worked successively for Nathalie Griesbeck and Pavel Telička, two members of the liberal Alliance of Liberals and Democrats for Europe (ALDE) parliamentary group. After Macron’s victory in May 2017, Anglade quit his job at the Parliament to campaign for the National Assembly under the LREM banner. In the 2017 legislative election, he defeated Sophie Rauszer, supported by La France Insoumise (LFI), with over 73% of the vote in the second round. He succeeded Philip Cordery, a member of the Socialist Party (PS), who placed fourth in the election.

In Parliament, Anglade served as member of the Defence Committee from 2017 until 2019 before moving to the Committee on Legal Affairs and the Committee on European Affairs in 2019. In 2019, he was elected as the committee's chairman; however, due to disagreements with incumbent chairwoman Sabine Thillaye who refused to accept the legality of the vote, he did not take office.

In addition to his committee assignments, Anglade is part of the parliamentary friendship groups with Belgium and Luxembourg. Since 2019, he has also been a member of the French delegation to the Franco-German Parliamentary Assembly.

In December 2017, Anglade was appointed by Christophe Castaner to set up a task force in charge of preparing LREM's campaign for the 2019 European elections.

== Political positions ==
In July 2019, Anglade voted in favor of the French ratification of the European Union’s Comprehensive Economic and Trade Agreement (CETA) with Canada.
