= Saint-Pierre-des-Corps =

- Commune
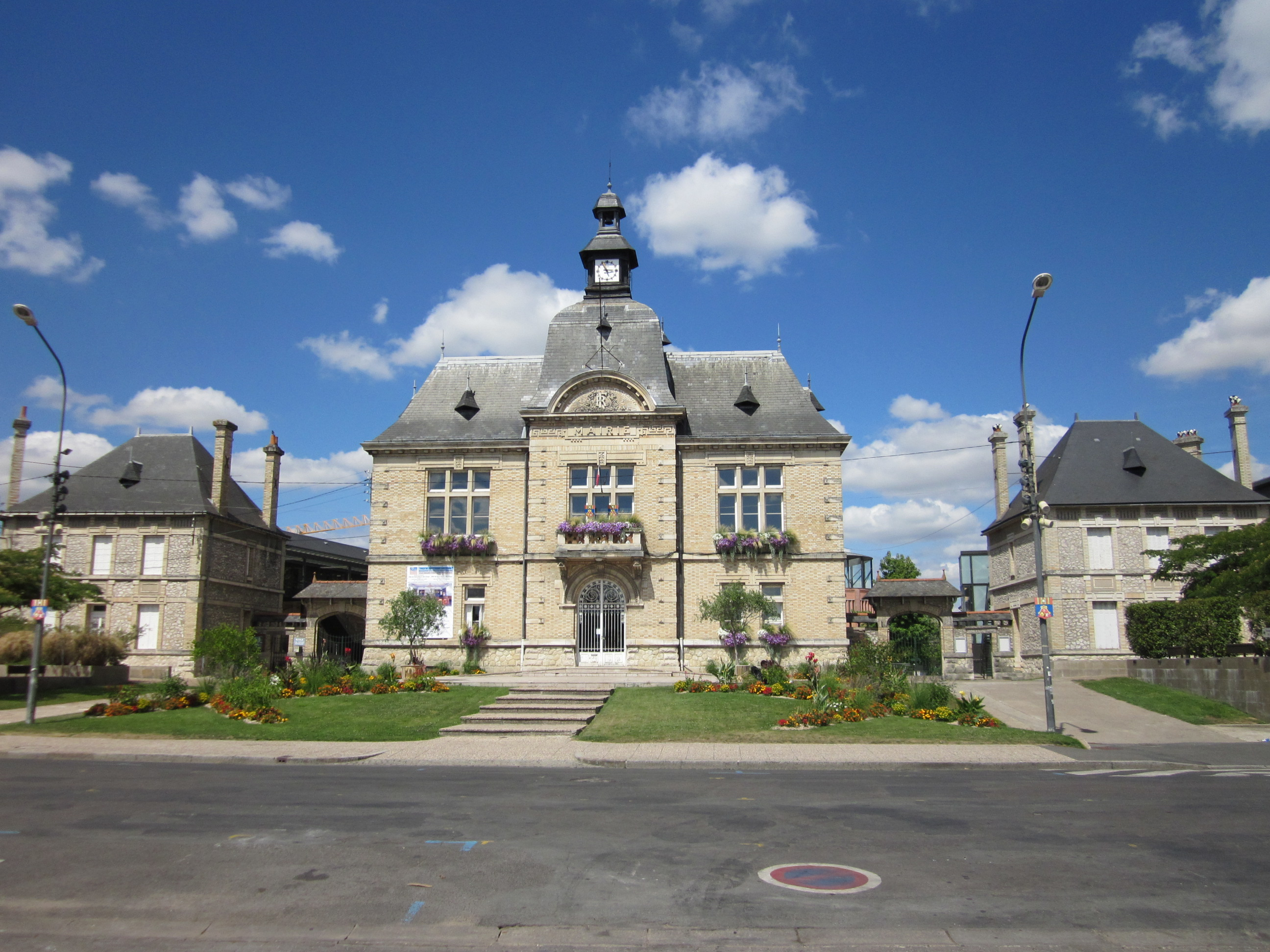
- Town hall

- Coat of arms
- Location of Saint-Pierre-des-Corps
- Location within France Location within Centre-Val de Loire
- Coordinates: 47°23′29″N 0°43′44″E
- Country: France
- Region: Centre-Val de Loire
- Department: Indre-et-Loire
- Arrondissement: Tours
- Canton: Saint-Pierre-des-Corps
- Intercommunality: Tours Métropole Val de Loire

Government
  - Mayor (2020–2026): Emmanuel François
- Area^{1}: 11.28 km^{2} (4.36 sq mi)
- Highest elevation: 51 m (167 ft)
- Lowest elevation: 46 m (151 ft)
- Population (2023): 15,898
  - Density: 1,409/km^{2} (3,650/sq mi)
- Time zone: UTC+01:00 (CET)
  - Summer (DST): UTC+02:00 (CEST)
- INSEE/Postal code: 37233 /37700
- ^{1} French Land Register data, which excludes lakes, ponds, glaciers > 1 km^{2} (0.386 sq mi or 247 acres) and river estuaries.

Saint-Pierre-des-Corps (French pronunciation: [sɛ̃ pjɛʁ de kɔʁ]) is a commune in the French department of Indre-et-Loire, Centre-Val de Loire, France. It is located about 4 km (2.5 mi) from Tours. During the French Revolution, it was called La Clarté-Républicaine.

== Population ==
Historical population

Year	Pop.	±% p.a.
1793	633	—
1800	724	+1.94%
1806	678	−1.09%
1821	745	+0.63%
1831	824	+1.01%
1836	991	+3.76%
1841	965	−0.53%
1846	1,060	+1.90%
1851	1,289	+3.99%
1856	1,091	−3.28%
1861	1,058	−0.61%
1866	1,188	+2.34%
1872	1,251	+0.86%
1876	1,397	+2.80%
1881	1,612	+2.90%
1886	2,042	+4.84%
1891	2,107	+0.63%
1896	2,327	+2.01%
1901	2,757	+3.45%

Year	Pop.	±% p.a.
1906	3,066	+2.15%
1911	4,093	+5.95%
1921	5,062	+2.15%
1926	6,655	+5.62%
1931	7,444	+2.27%
1936	8,187	+1.92%
1946	7,413	−0.99%
1954	10,656	+4.64%
1962	14,172	+3.63%
1968	15,232	+1.21%
1975	18,292	+2.65%
1982	18,313	+0.02%
1990	17,947	−0.25%
1999	15,773	−1.42%
2007	15,665	−0.09%
2012	15,224	−0.57%
2017	15,838	+0.79%
2023	15,898	+0.06%

Source: EHESS and INSEE (1968–2023)

== Transportation ==
Located on the eastern edge of Tours, Saint-Pierre-des-Corps station is a major hub in the French railway network, connecting the LGV Atlantique, used by high-speed trains traveling from Paris to Nantes, Bordeaux, and Toulouse. The station at Tours itself is a terminus station through which trains cannot pass, so trains that do not terminate at Tours tend to avoid it entirely, leaving Saint-Pierre-des-Corps as the principal long distance station for the entire metropolitan area.

== See also ==
- Communes of the Indre-et-Loire department
