= Arrondissements of the Indre-et-Loire department =

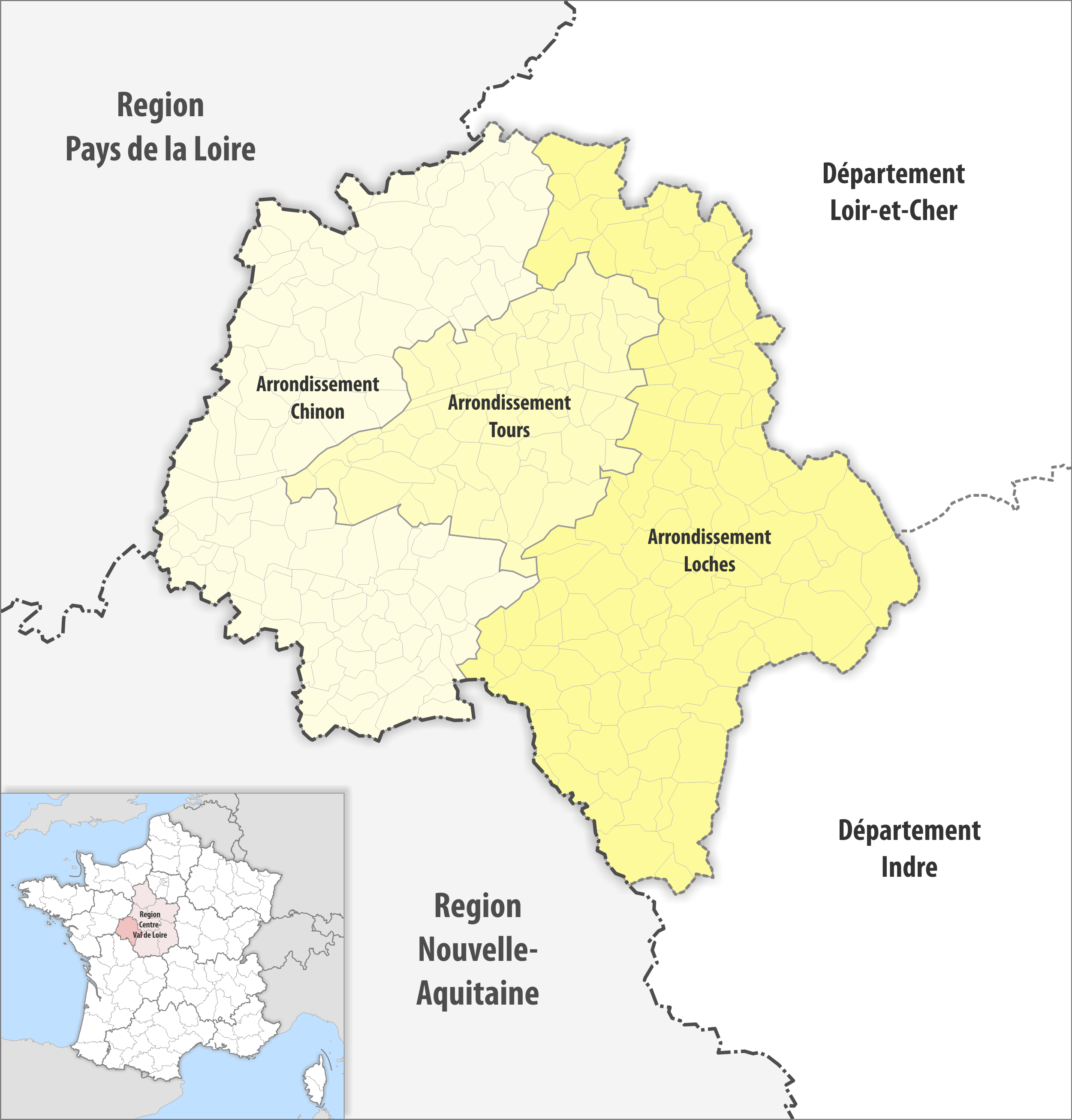
Map of arrondissements of the Indre-et-Loire department.

The 3 arrondissements of the Indre-et-Loire department are:

1. Arrondissement of Chinon, (subprefecture: Chinon) with 106 communes. The population of the arrondissement was 103,540 in 2021.
2. Arrondissement of Loches, (subprefecture: Loches) with 112 communes. The population of the arrondissement was 116,590 in 2021.
3. Arrondissement of Tours, (prefecture of the Indre-et-Loire department: Tours) with 54 communes. The population of the arrondissement was 392,030 in 2021.

== History ==
In 1800 the arrondissements of Tours, Chinon and Loches were established. The arrondissement of Loches was disbanded in 1926, and restored in 1943.

The borders of the arrondissements of Indre-et-Loire were modified in January 2017:

- 12 communes from the arrondissement of Chinon to the arrondissement of Tours
- 34 communes from the arrondissement of Tours to the arrondissement of Chinon
- 46 communes from the arrondissement of Tours to the arrondissement of Loches
