= Indre-et-Loire's 2nd constituency =

Constituency of the National Assembly of France

2nd constituency of Indre-et-Loire
- inline Constituency of the National Assembly of France

- Constituency in Department

- Location of Indre-et-Loire in France
- Deputy: Daniel Labaronne; RE
- Department: Indre-et-Loire

The 2nd constituency of Indre-et-Loire is one of five French legislative constituencies in the Indre-et-Loire département.

It consists of the following cantons; Amboise, Bléré, Château-Renault, Montlouis-sur-Loire, Tours Nord-Est, Vouvray.

== Deputies ==
Election	Member	Party
1988	Bernard Debré	RPR
1993	Bernard Debré	RPR
1997	Jean-Jacques Filleul	PS
2002	Claude Greff	UMP
2007	Claude Greff	UMP
2012	Claude Greff	UMP
2017	Daniel Labaronne	LREM
2022	Daniel Labaronne	RE
2024	Daniel Labaronne	RE

== Election results ==
=== 2024 ===
Candidate	Party	Alliance	First round			Second round		
Candidate	Party	Alliance	Votes	%	+/–	Votes	%	+/–
Corine Gougeron	RN		22,396	35.08	+13.18	24,906	40.01	new
Daniel Labaronne	REN	Ensemble	20,801	32.58	+0.20	37,343	59.99	+5.28
Christelle Gobert	LFI	NFP	14,891	23.33	-2.55	withdrew		
Maxime Maintier	LR	UDC	4,123	6.46	-1.31			
Anne Brunet	LO		938	1.47	+0.10			
Philippe Saintignan	REC		688	1.08	-3.28			
Votes			63,837	100.00		62,249	100.00	
Valid votes			63,837	97.21	-0.61	62,249	94.93	+2.97
Blank votes			1,302	1.98	+0.41	2,426	3.70	-2.30
Null votes			530	0.81	+0.19	901	1.37	-1.17
Turnout			65,669	70.52	+18.57	65,576	70.41	+21.32
Abstentions			27,451	29.48	-18.57	27,563	9.59	-21.32
Registered voters			93,120			93,139		
Result			RE HOLD					

=== 2022 ===
Legislative Election 2022: Indre-et-Loire's 2nd constituency
Party	Candidate	Votes	%	±%
LREM (Ensemble)	Daniel Labaronne	15,175	32.38	-5.04
LFI (NUPÉS)	Christelle Gobert	12,128	25.88	+2.08
RN	Christophe Guestault	10,262	21.90	+12.73
LR (UDC)	Svetlana Nicolaeff	3,639	7.77	−13.39
REC	Dominique Daillet	2,039	4.35	N/A
DVE	Christophe Lannoy	1,669	3.56	N/A
LMR	Angélique Delahaye	1,307	2.79	N/A
LO	Anne Brunet	643	1.37	+0.63
Turnout		46,862	51.95	−0.69
2nd round result
LREM (Ensemble)	Daniel Labaronne	22,663	54.71	-2.15
LFI (NUPÉS)	Christelle Gobert	18,758	45.29	N/A
Turnout		41,421	49.09	+5.15
LREM hold				

=== 2017 ===
Candidate	Label	First round		Second round	
Candidate	Label	Votes	%	Votes	%
Daniel Labaronne	REM	17,087	37.42	20,192	56.86
Claude Greff	LR	9,663	21.16	15,321	43.14
Frédéric Nobileau	FI	5,726	12.54		
Stanislas de La Ruffie	FN	4,187	9.17		
Isabelle Gaudron	PS	2,621	5.74		
Éric Beaugendre	ECO	1,815	3.98		
Virginie Bergerard	DLF	1,248	2.73		
Marc Lelandais	DVD	974	2.13		
Fabien Coste	PCF	785	1.72		
Pierre Morin	DVG	665	1.46		
Catherine Rudeaut	EXG	337	0.74		
Valérie Lonjon	DIV	266	0.58		
Alexis Lamoureux	PRG	204	0.45		
Arthur Dufourg	DVD	82	0.18		
Votes		45,660	100.00	35,513	100.00
Valid votes		45,660	97.87	35,513	89.16
Blank votes		709	1.52	3,260	8.18
Null votes		287	0.62	1,059	2.66
Turnout		46,656	52.64	39,832	44.94
Abstentions		41,974	47.36	48,795	55.06
Registered voters		88,630		88,627	
Source: Ministry of the Interior

=== 2012 ===
2012 legislative election in Indre-Et-Loire's 2nd constituency
Candidate	Party	First round		Second round	
Candidate	Party	Votes	%	Votes	%
Claude Greff	UMP	18,921	37.60%	24,993	50.26%
Christophe Rossignol	EELV–PS	12,829	25.49%	24,732	49.74%
Isabelle Gaudron	PS dissident	7,406	14.72%		
Gilles Godefroy	FN	5,982	11.89%		
Michel Cosnier	FG	3,225	6.41%		
Gerard Guertin	PRG	425	0.84%		
Bernadette Lefort	DLR	353	0.70%		
Alexis Lamoureux		293	0.58%		
Delphine Laubu	NPA	243	0.48%		
Catherine Rudeaut	LO	237	0.47%		
Alexis Deprau	CNIP	187	0.37%		
Paul Olivier	POI	176	0.35%		
Josette Constant	AR	44	0.09%		
Valid votes		50,321	98.54%	49,725	97.17%
Spoilt and null votes		748	1.46%	1,448	2.83%
Votes cast / turnout		51,069	60.50%	51,173	60.62%
Abstentions		33,345	39.50%	33,237	39.38%
Registered voters		84,414	100.00%	84,410	100.00%

=== 2007 ===
Legislative Election 2007: Indre-et-Loire's 2nd constituency
Party	Candidate	Votes	%	±%
UMP	Claude Greff	26,263	46.19	+13.60
PRG	Mélanie Fortier	15,068	26.50	N/A
MoDem	Catherine Lalot	4,473	7.87	N/A
FN	Jean Guimard	2,249	3.96	−6.82
LV	Jean-Claude Bragoulet	2,038	3.58	+0.38
PCF	Dominique Touraine	1,670	2.94	+0.78
LCR	Gérald Gaschet	1,480	2.60	+1.21
Others	N/A	3,620	-	−
Turnout		57,888	62.89	−3.23
2nd round result
UMP	Claude Greff	29,699	53.99	+0.74
PRG	Mélanie Fortier	25,312	46.01	N/A
Turnout		56,456	61.33	−2.35
UMP hold				

=== 2002 ===
Legislative Election 2002: Indre-et-Loire's 2nd constituency
Party	Candidate	Votes	%	±%
PS	Jean-Jacques Filleul	19,129	34.99	+1.57
UMP	Claude Greff	17,818	32.59	+0.03
FN	Jean Guimard	5,892	10.78	−1.99
UDF	Christian Saint-Etienne	4,191	7.67	N/A
LV	Régina Mery	1,752	3.20	+0.48
PCF	Dominique Touraine	1,181	2.16	−2.90
Others	N/A	4,705	-	−
Turnout		56,080	66.12	−3.74
2nd round result
UMP	Claude Greff	27,947	53.25	+5.69
PS	Jean-Jacques Filleul	24,538	46.75	−5.69
Turnout		54,202	63.68	−10.69
UMP gain from PS				

=== 1997 ===
Legislative Election 1997: Indre-et-Loire's 2nd constituency
Party	Candidate	Votes	%	±%
PS	Jean-Jacques Filleul	17,274	33.42	
RPR	Bernard Debré	16,832	32.56	
FN	Michel Hubault	6,599	12.77	
PCF	Eric Carreau	2,615	5.06	
LDI	Febien Riolet	1,973	3.82	
GE	Nathalie Bellanger	1,941	3.76	
LO	Etienne Cherblanc	1,600	3.10	
LV	Laurent Canot	1,407	2.72	
Others	N/A	1,448	-	
Turnout		54,537	69.86	
2nd round result
PS	Jean-Jacques Filleul	28,768	52.44	
RPR	Bernard Debré	26,088	47.56	
Turnout		58,061	74.37	
PS gain from RPR				
