= Laurent Baumel =

French politician (born 1965)

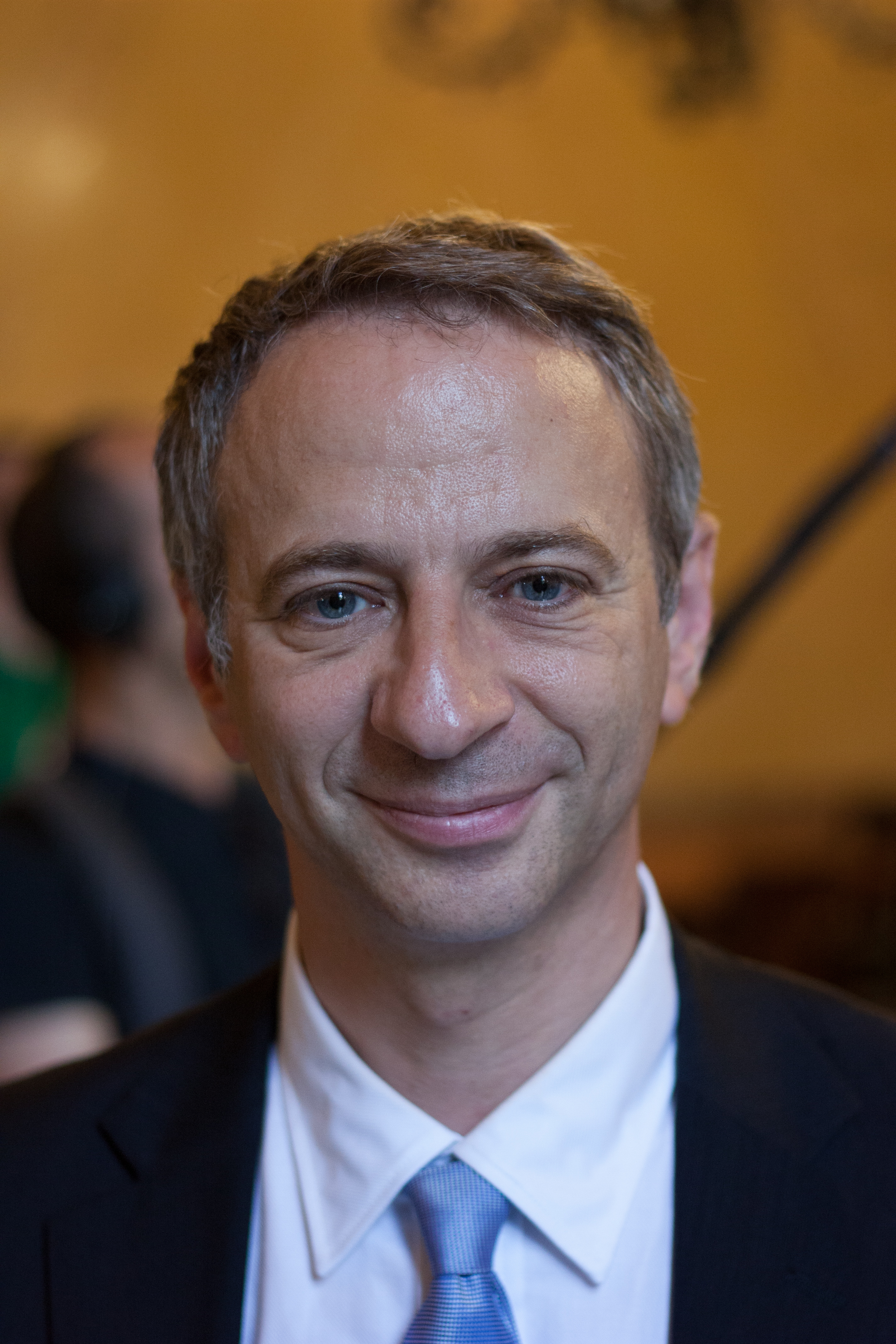
- Baumel in 2012

Member of the National Assembly for Indre-et-Loire's 4th constituency
- Incumbent
- Assumed office 8 July 2024
- Preceded by: Fabienne Colboc
- In office 20 June 2012 – 20 June 2017
- Preceded by: Hervé Novelli
- Succeeded by: Fabienne Colboc

Mayor of Ballan-Miré
- In office 16 March 2008 – 30 March 2014
- Preceded by: Jacques Rabier
- Succeeded by: Alexandre Chas

Personal details
- Born: 13 August 1965 (age 60) Charleville-Mézières, France
- Party: Socialist Party
- Education: Lycée Louis-le-Grand
- Alma mater: École centrale de Lyon; Sciences Po

Laurent Baumel (French pronunciation: [lɔʁɑ̃ bomɛl]; born 13 August 1965) is a French politician who has represented the 4th constituency of Indre-et-Loire in the National Assembly since 2024, previously holding the seat from 2012 to 2017. A member of the Socialist Party (PS), he held the mayorship of Ballan-Miré from 2008 to 2014.
