= Saint-Avertin =

- Commune
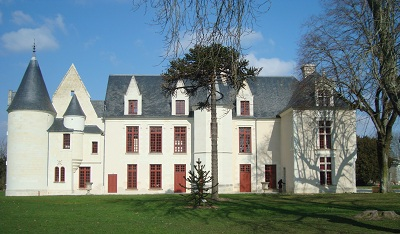
- Chateau of Cangé

- Coat of arms
- Location of Saint-Avertin
- Location within France Location within Centre-Val de Loire
- Coordinates: 47°22′03″N 0°43′40″E
- Country: France
- Region: Centre-Val de Loire
- Department: Indre-et-Loire
- Arrondissement: Tours
- Canton: Saint-Pierre-des-Corps
- Intercommunality: Tours Métropole Val de Loire

Government
  - Mayor (2020–2026): Laurent Raymond
- Area^{1}: 13.25 km^{2} (5.12 sq mi)
- Highest elevation: 98 m (322 ft)
- Lowest elevation: 46 m (151 ft)
- Population (2023): 14,999
  - Density: 1,132/km^{2} (2,932/sq mi)
- Time zone: UTC+01:00 (CET)
  - Summer (DST): UTC+02:00 (CEST)
- INSEE/Postal code: 37208 /37550
- ^{1} French Land Register data, which excludes lakes, ponds, glaciers > 1 km^{2} (0.386 sq mi or 247 acres) and river estuaries.

Saint-Avertin (French pronunciation: [sɛ̃.t‿avɛʁtɛ̃]) is a commune in the Indre-et-Loire department in central France.

== History ==
Traces of human activity from the times of Roman Gaul have been found in the area which is now Saint-Avertin, including a quarry that provided stones for the building of nearby Caesarodunum (Tours). The settlement was first mentioned in 930 as Venciacus, the latinized form of Vençay. In the 14th century, Vençay took the name Saint-Avertin after Aventinus of Tours, a monk who followed Thomas Becket, Archbishop of Canterbury, in his exile to France and settled in Vençay after Becket's death in 1170.

The castle of Cangé has existed at least since the 12th century. The present structure dates from the 16th century, when the Coningham family rebuilt it. In June 1940, following the German invasion of France, the government of the Third Republic withdrew to Tours. President Albert Lebrun spent five days in the castle of Cangé, where he presided two Councils of the Ministers on 12 and 13 June. After a devastating fire in 1978, the castle was bought by the commune. Since its renovation, it houses the multimedia library, the music school and the recreation centre.

== People ==
- Christophe Plantin (c. 1520–1589), book-binder and typograph, was born in Saint-Avertin.
- Jules Romains (Louis Farigoule, 1885–1972), poet and writer, owned the manoir de la Grand'Cour in Saint-Avertin from 1929 until his death.

== Population ==
Historical population

Year	Pop.	±% p.a.
1793	1,180	—
1800	1,272	+1.08%
1806	1,267	−0.07%
1821	1,167	−0.55%
1831	1,296	+1.05%
1836	1,300	+0.06%
1841	1,307	+0.11%
1846	1,322	+0.23%
1851	1,359	+0.55%
1856	1,333	−0.39%
1861	1,457	+1.79%
1866	1,541	+1.13%
1872	1,604	+0.67%
1876	1,700	+1.46%
1881	1,731	+0.36%
1886	1,824	+1.05%
1891	1,706	−1.33%
1896	1,723	+0.20%
1901	1,739	+0.19%

Year	Pop.	±% p.a.
1906	1,752	+0.15%
1911	1,905	+1.69%
1921	2,137	+1.16%
1926	2,608	+4.06%
1931	2,870	+1.93%
1936	3,009	+0.95%
1946	4,005	+2.90%
1954	3,907	−0.31%
1962	5,146	+3.50%
1968	7,415	+6.28%
1975	8,795	+2.47%
1982	10,115	+2.02%
1990	12,187	+2.36%
1999	14,092	+1.63%
2007	14,006	−0.08%
2012	14,856	+1.19%
2017	15,025	+0.23%
2023	14,999	−0.03%

Source: EHESS and INSEE (1968-2023)

== See also ==
- Communes of the Indre-et-Loire department
