= Fourth French legislative constituency for citizens abroad =

Constituency of the French Fifth Republic

4th constituency for French residents overseas
- inline Constituency of the National Assembly of France

- Deputy: Pieyre-Alexandre Anglade; RE
- Department: None (overseas residents)
- Cantons: None
- Registered voters: 158,035

The fourth French legislative constituency for citizens abroad (quatrième circonscription des Français établis hors de France) is one of eleven constituencies each electing one representative of French people living outside France to the French National Assembly.

== Area ==
In terms of area, it is the second smallest of the eleven constituencies (after the sixth: Switzerland and Liechtenstein), covering the three Benelux countries: Belgium, the Netherlands and Luxembourg. In contrast, it is the second most populous (after the first: United States and Canada): as of New Year's Day 2011, it contained 150,965 registered French voters. The bulk of these, 101,236, were living in Belgium, the country with the fifth greatest number of registered French residents in the world.

This constituency elected its first ever representative at the 2012 French legislative election.

== Deputies ==
Election	Member	Party
2012	Philip Cordery	PS
2017	Pieyre-Alexandre Anglade	LREM
2022	Pieyre-Alexandre Anglade	LREM
2024	Pieyre-Alexandre Anglade	RE

== Election results ==
=== 2024 ===
Candidate	Party	Alliance	First round		Second round	
Candidate	Party	Alliance	Votes	%	Votes	%
Cécilia Gondard	PS	NFP	27,898	37.45	36,127	49.76
Pieyre-Alexandre Anglade	RE	Ensemble	26,410	35.46	36,476	50.24
Charlotte Beaufils	RN		6,736	9.04		
Geneviève Machicote	LR	UDC	4,604	6.18		
Juliette de Causans	ECO		4,318	5.80		
Sacha Courtial	ECO	Volt	1,563	2.10		
Patrick Brisset	DIV		1,492	2.00		
Anne-Catherine Girard	REC		1,001	1.34		
Aude Rossolini	DIV		463	0.62		
Valid votes			74,485	100.00	72,603	100.00
Blank votes			713	0.95	3,609	4.73
Null votes			99	0.13	153	0.20
Turnout			75,297	47.64	76,365	48.32
Abstentions			82,742	52.36	81,670	51.68
Registered voters			158,039		158,035	
Result			RE HOLD			

=== 2022 ===
Legislative Election 2022: 4th constituency for French citizens overseas
Party	Candidate	Votes	%	±%
LREM (Ensemble)	Pieyre-Alexandre Anglade	16,597	38.93	-13.34
PS (NUPÉS)	Cécilia Gondard	13,842	32.47	+5.46
LR (UDC)	Geneviève Machicote	2,510	5.89	−3.19
DVC	Marie-Josée Mabasi	2,244	5.26	N/A
REC	Anne-Catherine Girard	2,148	5.04	N/A
Volt	Cédric Deverchère	1,600	3.75	N/A
RN	Emmanuelle Cuignet	1,402	3.29	+0.16
MRC (FGR)	Catherine Coutard	1,021	2.39	N/A
Others	N/A	1,272	2.99	−
Turnout		42,636	29.06	+6.40
2nd round result
LREM (Ensemble)	Pieyre-Alexandre Anglade	25,694	55.15	-18.58
PS (NUPÉS)	Cécilia Gondard	20,893	44.85	+18.58
Turnout		46,587	32.58	+11.81
LREM hold				

=== 2017 ===
Candidate	Label	First round		Second round	
Candidate	Label	Votes	%	Votes	%
Pieyre-Alexandre Anglade	REM	14,461	52.27	18,138	73.73
Sophie Rauszer	FI	3,030	10.95	6,464	26.27
Perrine Ledan	ECO	2,706	9.78		
Valérie Bros	LR	2,512	9.08		
Philip Cordery	PS	1,737	6.28		
Soraya Lemaire	FN	865	3.13		
Caroline Laporte	UDI	781	2.82		
Muriel Réus	DVD	395	1.43		
Denys Dhiver	DVD	380	1.37		
Olivier Rasson	DIV	161	0.58		
Yves Gernigon	DIV	148	0.53		
Juliette Saumier	DIV	126	0.46		
Claire des Mesnards	DIV	119	0.43		
Yann Pereira	DIV	83	0.30		
Philippe Lanney	EXD	81	0.29		
Bertrand de Cordier	DVG	41	0.15		
Frédérique Plaisant	PRG	26	0.09		
Sylvain Bleubar	DIV	12	0.04		
Votes		27,664	100.00	24,602	100.00
Valid votes		27,664	99.43	24,602	96.50
Blank votes		68	0.24	710	2.78
Null votes		90	0.32	182	0.71
Turnout		27,822	22.66	25,494	20.77
Abstentions		94,943	77.34	97,262	79.23
Registered voters		122,765		122,756	
Source: Ministry of the Interior

=== 2012 ===
==== Candidates ====
The list of candidates was officially finalised on 14 May. There were sixteen candidates:

The Union for a Popular Movement initially chose Pascale Andréani, former permanent representative of France to NATO, as its candidate. When Andréani became France's permanent representative to the OECD, the party named Marie-Anne Montchamp, the then-Secretary of State on Solidarity, as candidate in her place. Jeremy Michel was her deputy (suppléant).

The Socialist Party chose Philip Cordery, a resident of Brussels. His deputy (suppléante) was Hélène Le Moing, a resident of The Hague.

Europe Écologie–The Greens chose Perrine Ledan, with Édouard Gaudot as her deputy (suppléant). Ledan, a journalist, is a resident of Brussels.

The Left Front, which included the French Communist Party, chose Charlotte Balavoine, with Patrick Cavaglieri as her deputy (suppléant). Balavoine was a member of the Communist Party.

The Democratic Movement chose Tanguy Le Breton, with Raphael Lederer as his deputy.

The National Front chose Sophie Duval. Martine Masse was her deputy.

The Radical Party of the Left chose Nadia Bourahla, with Philippe Loopuyt as her deputy.

The Christian Democratic Party (an associate party of the UMP) chose Stéphane Buffetaut, with Isabelle Soibinet as his deputy. Buffetaut was also endorsed by the National Centre of Independents and Peasants.

The Pirate Party chose Pablo Martin, with Alix Guillard as his deputy.

Solidarity and Progress, the French branch of the LaRouche movement, was represented by Guillaume Dubost, a 32-year-old electrical engineer and long-term resident of Brussels. He was a presiding member of Agora Erasmus, the Benelux branch of the LaRouche movement. Romain Drouillon was his deputy.

Dominique Paillé, a former spokesman for the Union for a Popular Movement, sought to be the candidate for that party. When he was not chosen, he stated that he would "definitely" be a candidate all the same, standing against Andréani if she did not desist. He eventually became the candidate of the centre-right Radical Party and the centrist Republican, Ecologist and Social Alliance. A resident of Brussels, he was a lawyer in Paris. His deputy (suppléante) was Anne Monseu Ducarme.

Virginie Taittinger stood as an independent right-wing candidate. Describing herself as close to the UMP, she presented herself as the "candidate of (Nicolas Sarkozy's) presidential majority", although she ran against the UMP-endorsed candidate. A resident of Brussels, she described herself officially as the candidate of the Union of the Centre and the Right of the French in Benelux. Gaël du Bouëtiez was her deputy.

Georges-Francis Seingry, a resident of Brussels who described himself as non-partisan, stood for the Gathering of French Residents Overseas (Rassemblement des Français de l'étranger), a political movement related to the Union for a Popular Movement. Éric Krebs was his deputy.

Ruben Mohedano-Brèthes had been a French expatriate in Belgium since 1996. He was an official of the European Union (in charge of information and communication since 1996: Eurobarometer opinion polls, audio-visual strategy and youth information) and a trade-unionist. He presented himself as an "independent centrist humanist" candidate, under the Force of Freedom banner. He was endorsed by the Centrist Alliance. He was also endorsed by the Liberal Democratic Party.

There were two independent candidates: Elisabeth Valenti (with Jean-Marie Soja as her deputy); and Elisabeth Chevalier (with Jeannine Porte as her deputy).

==== Results ====
As in other constituencies, turnout in the first round was low: 24.4% in Belgium, 24.4% also in Luxembourg, and 22.1% in the Netherlands. Socialist candidate Philip Cordery finished first in all three countries. He went on to win the second round by a fairly large margin.

Legislative Election 2012: Overseas residents 4 - 2nd round
Party	Candidate	Votes	%	±%
PS	Philip Cordery	13,089	53.16	−
UMP	Marie-Anne Montchamp	11,533	46.84	−
Turnout		25,242	26.03	−
PS win (new seat)				

Legislative Election 2012: Overseas residents 4 - 1st round
Party	Candidate	Votes	%	±%
PS	Philip Cordery	7 024	30.38	−
UMP	Marie-Anne Montchamp	4 891	21.15	−
EELV	Perrine Ledan	2 356	10.19	−
DVD	Virginie Taittinger	1 756	7.59	−
MoDem	Tanguy Le Breton	1 554	6.72	−
FN	Sophie Duval	1 357	5.87	−
DVD	Georges-Francis Seingry	1 169	5.06	−
FG	Charlotte Balavoine	970	4.19	−
Radical	Dominique Paillé	645	2.79	−
VIA	Stéphane Buffetaut	453	1.96	−
PP	Pablo Martin	312	1.35	−
AC	Ruben Mohedano-Brèthes	296	1.28	−
PRG	Nadia Bourahla	181	0.78	−
SP	Guillaume Dubost	99	0.43	−
Independent	Elisabeth Chevalier	40	0.17	−
Independent	Elisabeth Valentin	21	0.09	−
Turnout		23 332	24.1	−
