= Yves Dauge =

French politician (born 1935)

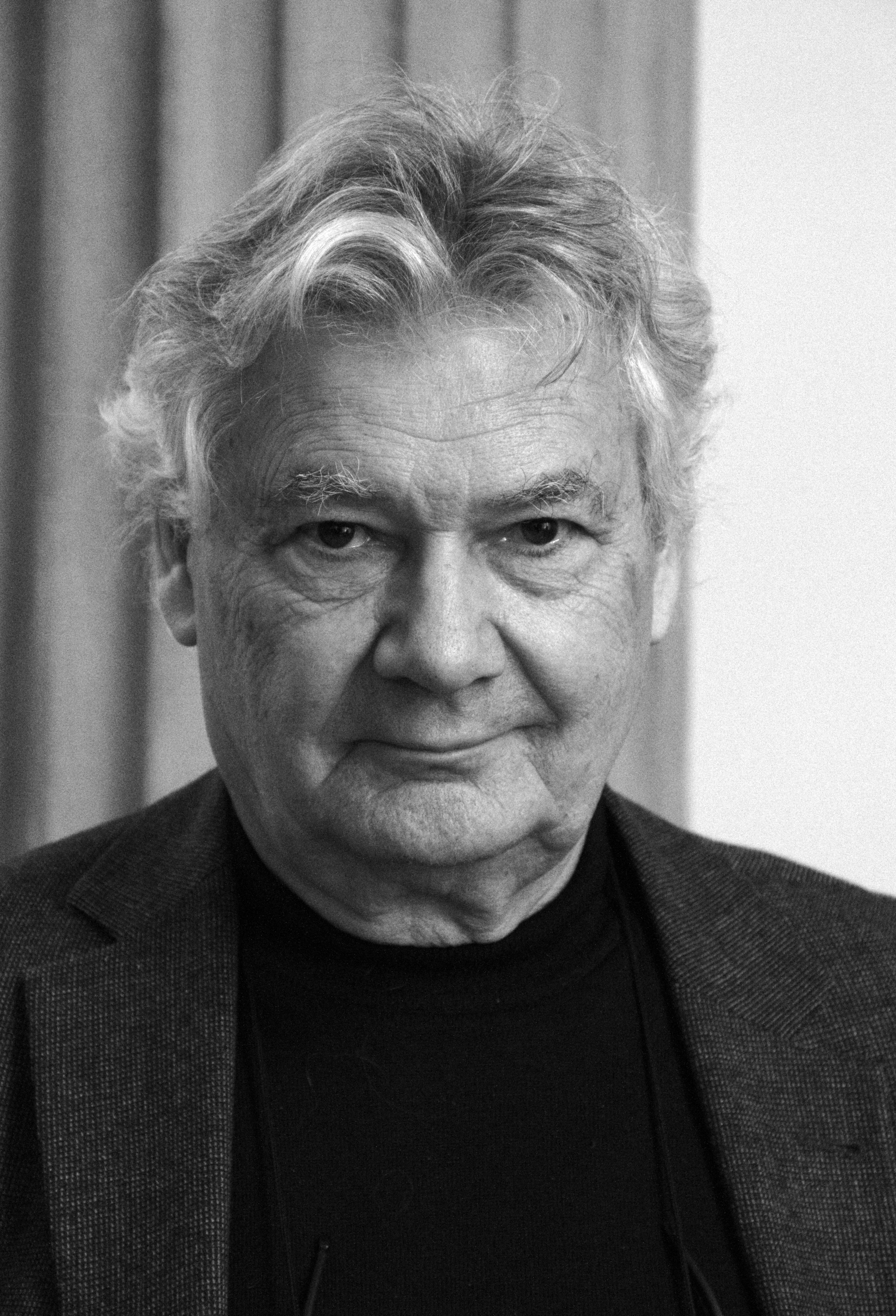
Yves Dauge, March 2013

Yves Dauge (born 26 January 1935) is a former member of the Senate of France. He represented the Communauté de communes de Rivière-Chinon-Saint-Benoist-la-Forêt, and is a member of the Socialist Party.

== Bibliography ==
- Page on the Senate website (in French)
