= Indre-et-Loire's 5th constituency =

Constituency of the National Assembly of France

5th constituency of Indre-et-Loire
- inline Constituency of the National Assembly of France

- Constituency in Department

- Location of Indre-et-Loire in France
- Deputy: Sabine Thillaye; MoDem
- Department: Indre-et-Loire

The 5th constituency of Indre-et-Loire is one of five French legislative constituencies in the Indre-et-Loire département.

It consists of the North-West of Tours, the Canton of Langeais and Canton of Saint-Cyr-sur-Loire and the communes Neuillé-Pont-Pierre and Neuvy-le-Roi.

== Deputies ==
Election	Member	Party
1988	Jean-Michel Testu	PS
1993	Philippe Briand	RPR
1997	Philippe Briand	RPR
2002	Philippe Briand	UMP
2007	Philippe Briand	UMP
2012	Philippe Briand	LR
2017	Sabine Thillaye	LREM
2020	Sabine Thillaye	MoDem
2022	Sabine Thillaye	MoDem
2024	Sabine Thillaye	MoDem

== Election results ==
=== 2024 ===
Candidate	Party	Alliance	First round			Second round		
Candidate	Party	Alliance	Votes	%	+/–	Votes	%	+/–
François Ducamp	RN		21,118	35.25	+14.17	23,869	40.73	-0.21
Sabine Thillaye	MoDEM	Ensemble	16,025	26.75	-2.40	34,741	59.27	+0.21
Marina Coccia	PCF	NFP	14,457	24.13	+4.75	withdrew		
Constance Bales	LR	UDC	6,805	11.36	-2.09			
David Billon	REC		809	1.35	-3.74			
Christine Delarue	LO		700	1.17	-0.62			
Votes			59,914	100.00		58,610	100.00	
Valid votes			59,914	97.32	-0.60	58,610	95.03	+5.06
Blank votes			1,165	1.89	+0.44	2,160	3.50	-4.33
Null votes			483	0.78	+0.15	907	1.47	-0.74
Turnout			61,562	70.21	+19.76	61,677	70.34	+22.70
Abstentions			26,115	29.79	-19.76	26,013	29.66	-22.70
Registered voters			87,677			87,690		
Result			MoDEM HOLD					

=== 2022 ===
Legislative Election 2022: Indre-et-Loire's 5th constituency
Party	Candidate	Votes	%	±%
MoDem (Ensemble)	Sabine Thillaye	12,543	29.17	-9.40
RN	Ambre Lousin	9,069	21.08	+11.66
PCF (NUPÉS)	Françoise Jeanne Renée Desmares Langlade	8,339	19.38	+1.46
LR (UDC)	Fabrice Boigard	5,788	13.45	−5.35
DVE	Charles Girardin	2,771	6.44	N/A
REC	Bruno Julien	2,191	5.09	N/A
LMR	Patrick Martinez	941	2.19	N/A
Others	N/A	1,390	-	−
Turnout		43,032	50.45	−1.05
2nd round result
MoDem (Ensemble)	Sabine Thillaye	22,055	59.06	+0.77
RN	Ambre Lousin	15,286	40.94	N/A
Turnout		37,341	47.64	+4.10
MoDem gain from LREM				

=== 2017 ===
Candidate	Label	First round		Second round	
Candidate	Label	Votes	%	Votes	%
Sabine Thillaye	REM	16,281	38.57	18,782	58.29
Fabrice Boigard	LR	7,935	18.80	13,441	41.71
Constance Ascar	FI	5,370	12.72		
Daniel Fraczak	FN	3,976	9.42		
Mélanie Fortier	PRG	2,180	5.17		
Erwan Deliz	EELV	1,699	4.03		
Augustin Chazal	DVD	1,355	3.21		
Jean de Fouquières	DLF	1,297	3.07		
Robert Bryche	ECO	891	2.11		
Françoise Roux	PCF	493	1.17		
Aurélien Durand	DIV	367	0.87		
Sylvie Thiébaut	EXG	363	0.86		
Patrice Vallée	DVD	0	0.00		
Votes		42,207	100.00	32,223	100.00
Valid votes		42,207	97.72	32,223	88.23
Blank votes		722	1.67	3,192	8.74
Null votes		263	0.61	1,106	3.03
Turnout		43,192	51.50	36,521	43.54
Abstentions		40,684	48.50	47,359	56.46
Registered voters		83,876		83,880	
Source: Ministry of the Interior

=== 2012 ===
2012 legislative election in Indre-Et-Loire's 5th constituency
Candidate	Party	First round		Second round	
Candidate	Party	Votes	%	Votes	%
Philippe Briand	UMP	19,538	40.20%	25,336	52.83%
Claude Roiron	PS	17,187	35.36%	22,624	47.17%
Véronique Pean	FN	5,737	11.80%		
Françoise Langlade	FG	2,141	4.41%		
Bernadette Lassus	EELV	1,330	2.74%		
Philippe Lacroix	MoDem	1,280	2.63%		
Robert Bryche	??	463	0.95%		
Martine Boulay	DLR	411	0.85%		
Marie-Claude Neveu	LO	249	0.51%		
Patrick Lepers	MPF	220	0.45%		
Michel Gamble	AR	46	0.09%		
Florence Moussu	PLD	1	0.00%		
Valid votes		48,603	98.86%	47,960	97.02%
Spoilt and null votes		558	1.14%	1,471	2.98%
Votes cast / turnout		49,161	61.09%	49,431	61.42%
Abstentions		31,308	38.91%	31,043	38.58%
Registered voters		80,469	100.00%	80,474	100.00%

=== 2007 ===
Legislative Election 2007: Indre-et-Loire's 5th constituency
Party	Candidate	Votes	%	±%
UMP	Philippe Briand	23,376	48.01	+2.24
PS	Claude Roiron	14,603	29.99	+0.85
MoDem	Elisabeth Kergoat	3,146	6.46	N/A
FN	Nelly Bertrand	1,686	3.46	−6.26
LV	Roukya Atteye	1,231	2.53	−1.11
Others	N/A	4,651	-	−
Turnout		49,460	63.29	−2.80
Registered electors		78,148		
2nd round result
UMP	Philippe Briand	25,770	55.37	−2.58
PS	Claude Roiron	20,771	44.63	+2.58
Turnout		47,725	61.06	−0.30
Registered electors		78,157		
UMP hold				

=== 2002 ===
Legislative Election 2002: Indre-et-Loire's 5th constituency
Party	Candidate	Votes	%	±%
UMP	Philippe Briand	21,768	45.77	+10.65
PS	Claude Roiron	13,857	29.14	−1.42
FN	Nelly Sellier	4,620	9.72	−2.70
LV	Catherine Lison-Croze	1,729	3.64	+0.68
PCF	Jean-Paul Moreau	1,030	2.17	−3.54
Others	N/A	4,551	-	−
Turnout		48,623	66.09	−2.04
Registered electors		73,572		
2nd round result
UMP	Philippe Briand	25,269	57.95	+7.52
PS	Claude Roiron	18,338	42.05	−7.52
Turnout		45,146	61.36	−11.86
Registered electors		73,570		
UMP hold				

=== 1997 ===
Legislative Election 1997: Indre-et-Loire's 5th constituency
Party	Candidate	Votes	%	±%
RPR	Philippe Briand	15,662	35.12	−0.25
PS	Claude Roiron	13,630	30.56	+12.38
FN	Pierre Le Goux	5,539	12.42	+0.85
PCF	Pierre Lambert	2,548	5.71	+0.72
LDI	Jean-Claude Huault	2,102	4.71	N?A
LO	Sylvie Thiébault	2,032	4.56	+1.83
LV	Michel Ries	1,318	2.96	N/A
GE	Jean-Luc Girardot	1,052	2.36	−11.41
DVE	Robert Bryche	719	1.61	N/A
Turnout		47,259	68.13	−1.08
Registered electors		69,348		
2nd round result
RPR	Philippe Briand	24,294	50.43	−7.60
PS	Claude Roiron	23,879	49.57	+7.60
Turnout		50,787	73.22	+5.13
Registered electors		69,347		
RPR hold				

=== 1993 ===
Legislative Election 1993: Indre-et-Loire's 5th constituency
Party	Candidate	Votes	%	±%
RPR	Philippe Briand	15,763	35.37	
PS	Jean-Michel Testu	8,101	18.18	
GE	Joel Pelicot	6,135	13.77	
FN	Pierre Le Goux	5,158	11.57	
DVD	Michel Montaubin	5,036	11.30	
PCF	Jean-Paul Moreau	2,222	4.99	
LO	Sylvie Thiebaut	1,217	2.73	
PT	Patrick Etesse	935	2.10	
Turnout		47,560	69.21	
Registered electors		68,719		
2nd round result
RPR	Philippe Briand	24,815	58.03	
PS	Jean-Michel Testu	17,948	41.97	
Turnout		46,784	68.09	
Registered electors		68,711		
RPR gain from PS				
