= Daniel Labaronne =

French politician

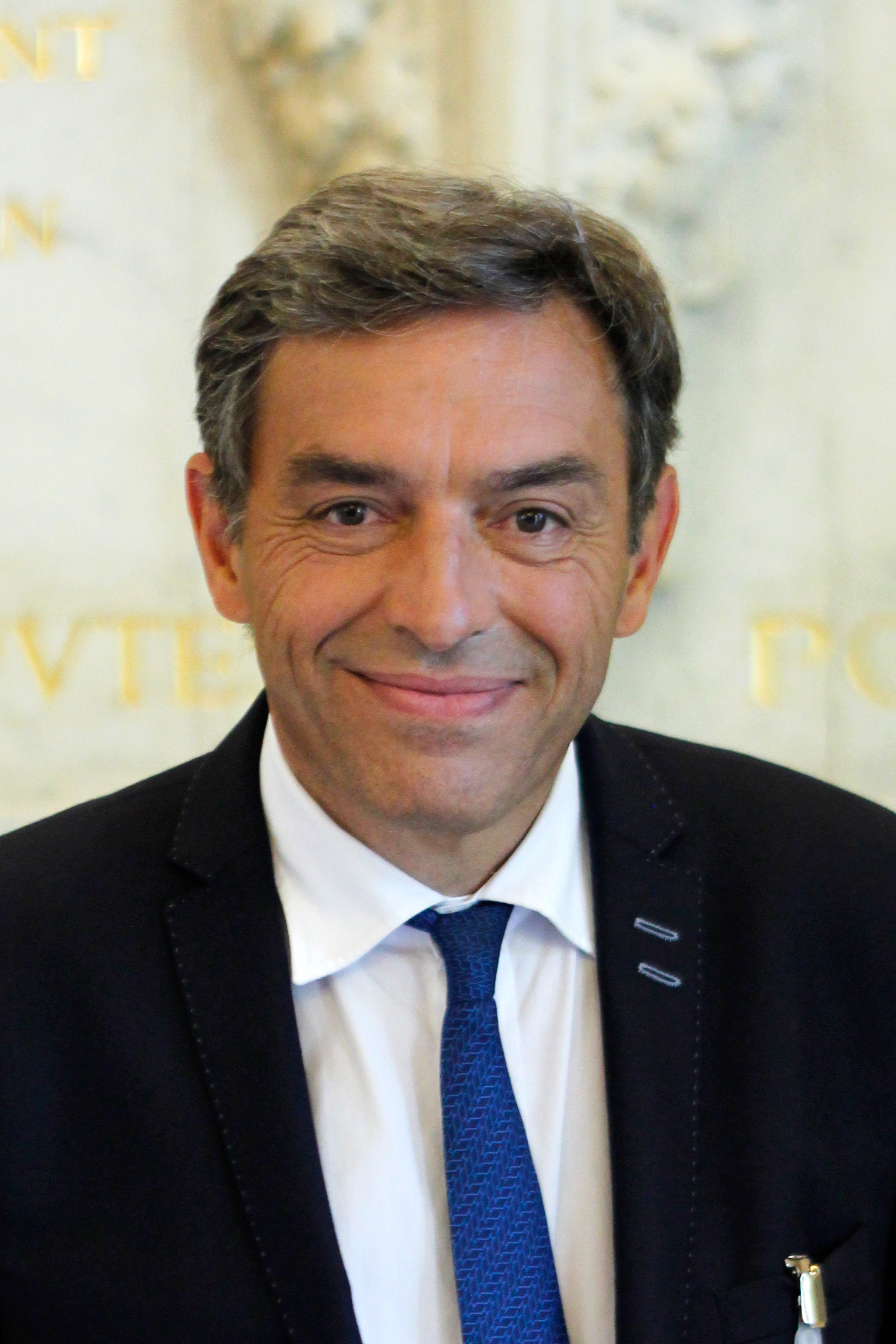
- Daniel Labaronne in 2017

Member of the National Assembly for Indre-et-Loire's 2nd constituency
- Incumbent
- Assumed office 21 June 2017
- Preceded by: Claude Greff

Personal details
- Born: 16 July 1955 (age 71) Paris, France
- Party: Renaissance
- Education: University of Tours

Daniel Labaronne (French pronunciation: [danjɛl labaʁɔn]) is a French economist and politician of Renaissance (RE) who has been serving as a member of the French National Assembly since 18 June 2017, representing the department of Indre-et-Loire.

== Early life and career ==
Labaronne was born to a family of farmers. Before entering politics, he was an economics professor at the University of Bordeaux.

== Political career ==
In parliament, Labaronne has since been serving on the Finance Committee. In 2022, he was – alongside Matthieu Lefèvre and Charles Sitzenstuhl – part of a parliamentary taskforce asked by Minister of Economics and Finance Bruno Le Maire to identify ways to reduce the national budget.

In addition to his committee assignments, Labaronne is a member of the French-Moroccan Parliamentary Friendship Group.
