= Canton of Joué-lès-Tours =

Coordinates: 47.35°N 0.66°E

The canton of Joué-lès-Tours is an administrative division of the Indre-et-Loire department, central France. It was created at the French canton reorganisation which came into effect in March 2015. Its seat is in Joué-lès-Tours.

It consists of the following communes:

1. Joué-lès-Tours
