= Sabine Thillaye =

French politician

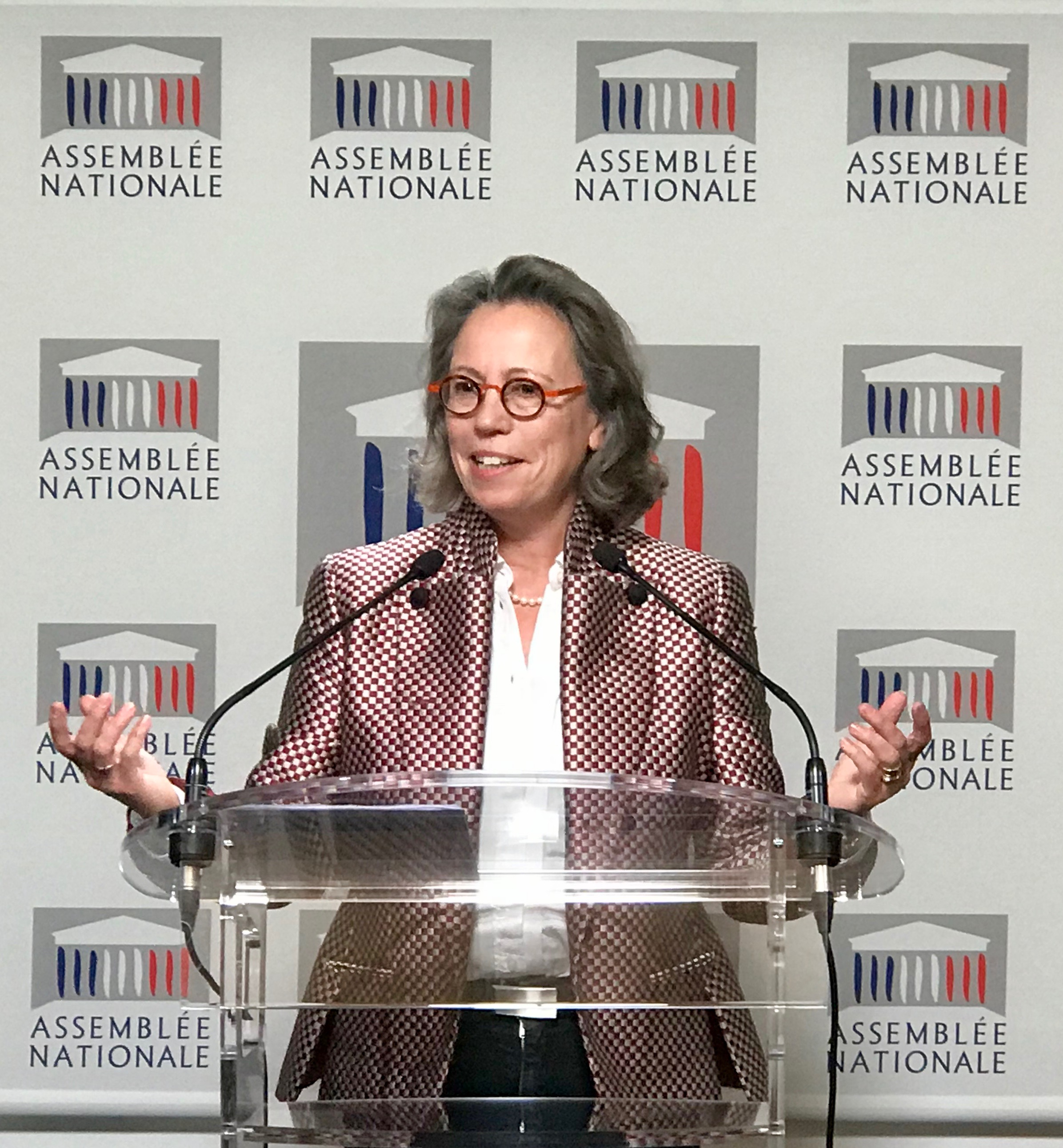

Member of the National Assembly for Indre-et-Loire's 5th constituency
- Incumbent
- Assumed office 21 June 2017
- Preceded by: Philippe Briand

Personal details
- Born: Sabine Fuchs; 18 May 1959 (age 66) Remscheid, Germany
- Party: La République En Marche!(2017–2020); Ecology Democracy Solidarity (2020 onwards)

Sabine Thillaye (born 18 May 1959) is a French-German entrepreneur and politician who has been serving as a member of the French National Assembly since 18 June 2017, representing the 5th constituency of the departement of Indre-et-Loire. She was elected as a member of La République En Marche!, but left the party in 2020 and was one of the 17 initial members of the new Ecology Democracy Solidarity group in the National Assembly.

== Early career ==
Before being elected as a member of parliament, Thillaye led a communications and signaling agency that she had founded in 1987. Being a studied legal practitioner herself, Thillaye also gave classes in German for students of law at François Rabelais University.

From 2006 to 2007, Thillaye headed the department for public relations of the business association MEDEF in the Touraine-province. Moreover, from 2016 to 2017, Thillaye was member of the board of directors of the association.

Prior to her candidature with En Marche!, Thillaye had already been engaged in the promotion of the European integration. As such, she is a founding member of the association Europe Val de Loire, an organisation she presided over temporarily. Additionally, she was deputy-chairwoman of the French-German cultural center in Touraine.

== Political career ==
In June 2016, Thillaye decided to run as a candidate for the En Marche!-movement for the legislative elections of 2017, imposing herself in the second tour against Fabrice Boigard of Les Républicains (LR).

Since 2018, Thillaye has been serving as chairwoman of the Committee for European Affairs. In this capacity, she argued for an expansion of the committee's competences. Furthermore, she proposed to facilitate the exchange between the different parliamentary committees. Together with Richard Ferrand, parliamentary leader of La République en Marche!, Thillaye introduced a resolution aiming at the promotion of the symbols of the European Union which was accepted on 27 November 2017. In

On 28 June 2018, Thillaye introduced a report on "The role of national parliaments in the European decision making process”. Amongst other things, it recommends granting the Committee for European Affairs the status a permanent committee thus enabling it to take part in the legislative process. Furthermore, the report generally suggests strengthening the relations between the national parliaments and the European institutions.

In 2019, Thillaye refused to accept the legality of vote in which Pieyre-Alexandre Anglade was elected to succeed her in the role of the committee's chair. As a consequence, she was excluded from the LREM parliamentary group after a lengthy debate in January 2020.

Thillaye is also a member of the National Assembly's Defence Committee, one of the house's eight permanent committees. On the committee, she is charged with questions related to European security policy as well as French-German defence cooperation.

== Franco-German parliamentary working group ==
Together with Andreas Jung, member of the German Bundestag, and her colleague from the National assembly, Christophe Arend, Thillaye served as co-chairwoman of the Franco-German parliamentary working group, which had been founded on 22 January 2018 on the occasion of the 55th anniversary of the signing of the Elyséé-treaty in 1963. It was composed of six French and six German members of parliament who contributed to the drafting of the Aachen Treaty, signed on 22 January 2019, and played a major role in the negotiations of the Franco-German parliamentary agreement, signed in Paris on 25 March 2019. Together with Jung, Thillaye was elected co-president of the bureau of the newly established Franco-German Parliamentary Assembly on the same day.

== Other activities ==
- Robert Schuman Foundation, Member of the Board of Directors

== Political positions ==
In a joint letter initiated by Norbert Röttgen and Anthony Gonzalez ahead of the 47th G7 summit in 2021, Thillaye joined some 70 legislators from Europe, the US and Japan in calling upon their leaders to take a tough stance on China and to "avoid becoming dependent" on the country for technology including artificial intelligence and 5G.
