= Cantons of Tours =

Coordinates: 47.39°N 0.69°E

The cantons of Tours are administrative divisions of the Indre-et-Loire department, in central France. Since the French canton reorganisation which came into effect in March 2015, the city of Tours is subdivided into 4 cantons. Their seat is in Tours.

== Cantons ==
Name	Population (2019)	Cantonal Code
Canton of Tours-1	41,158	3715
Canton of Tours-2	32,527	3716
Canton of Tours-3	30,986	3717
Canton of Tours-4	32,416	3718
