= Indre-et-Loire =

Department in Centre-Val de Loire, France

- Department of France
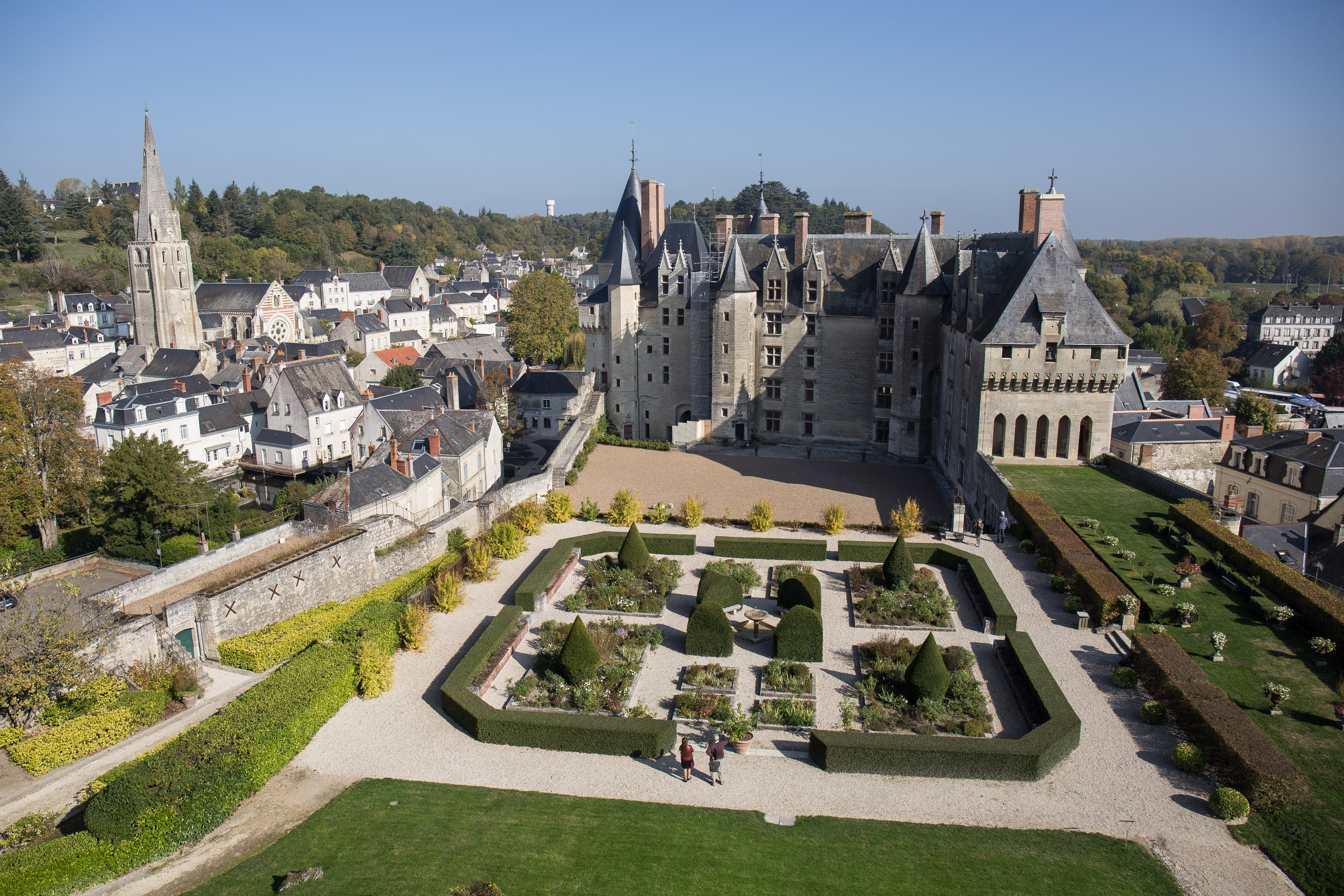
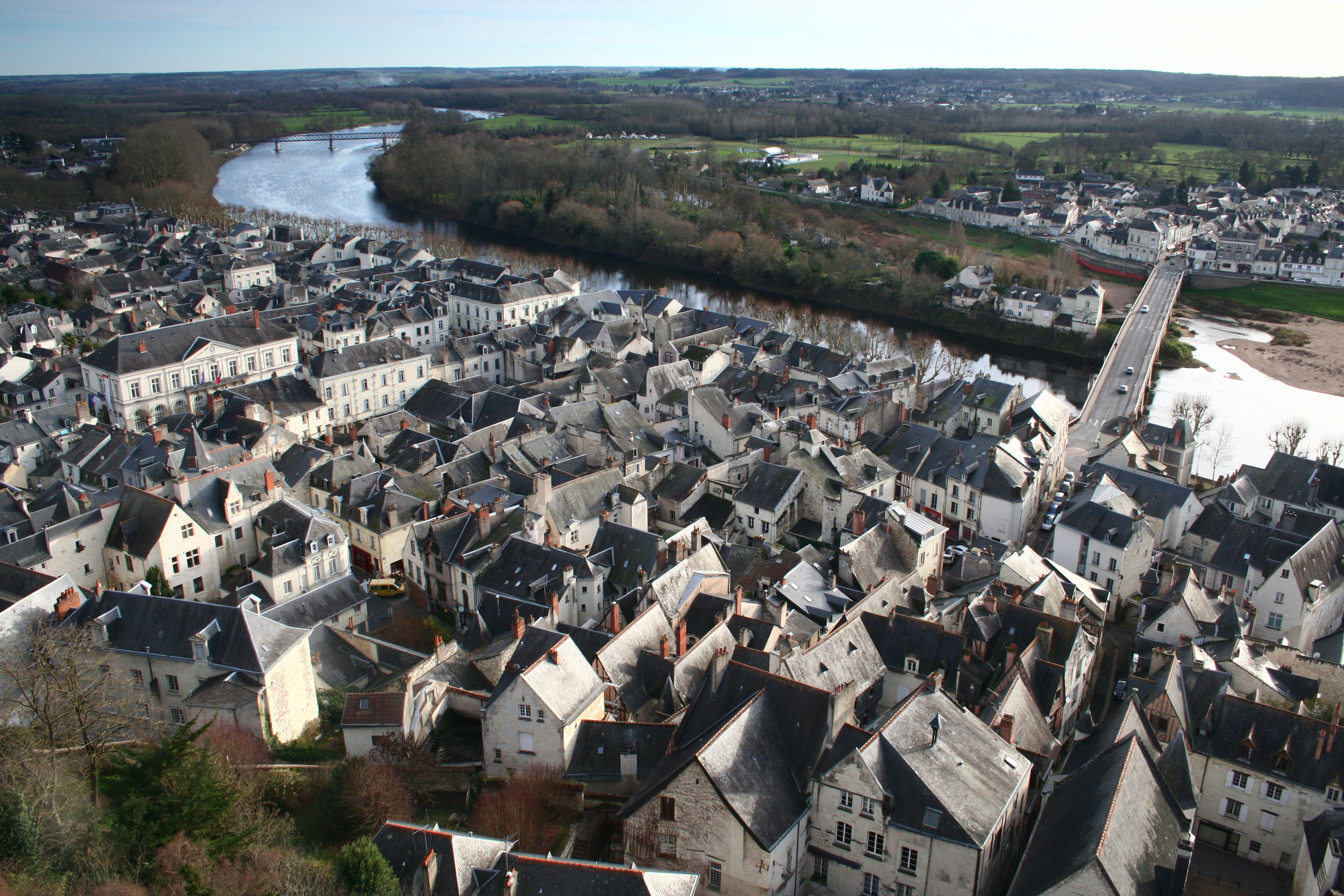
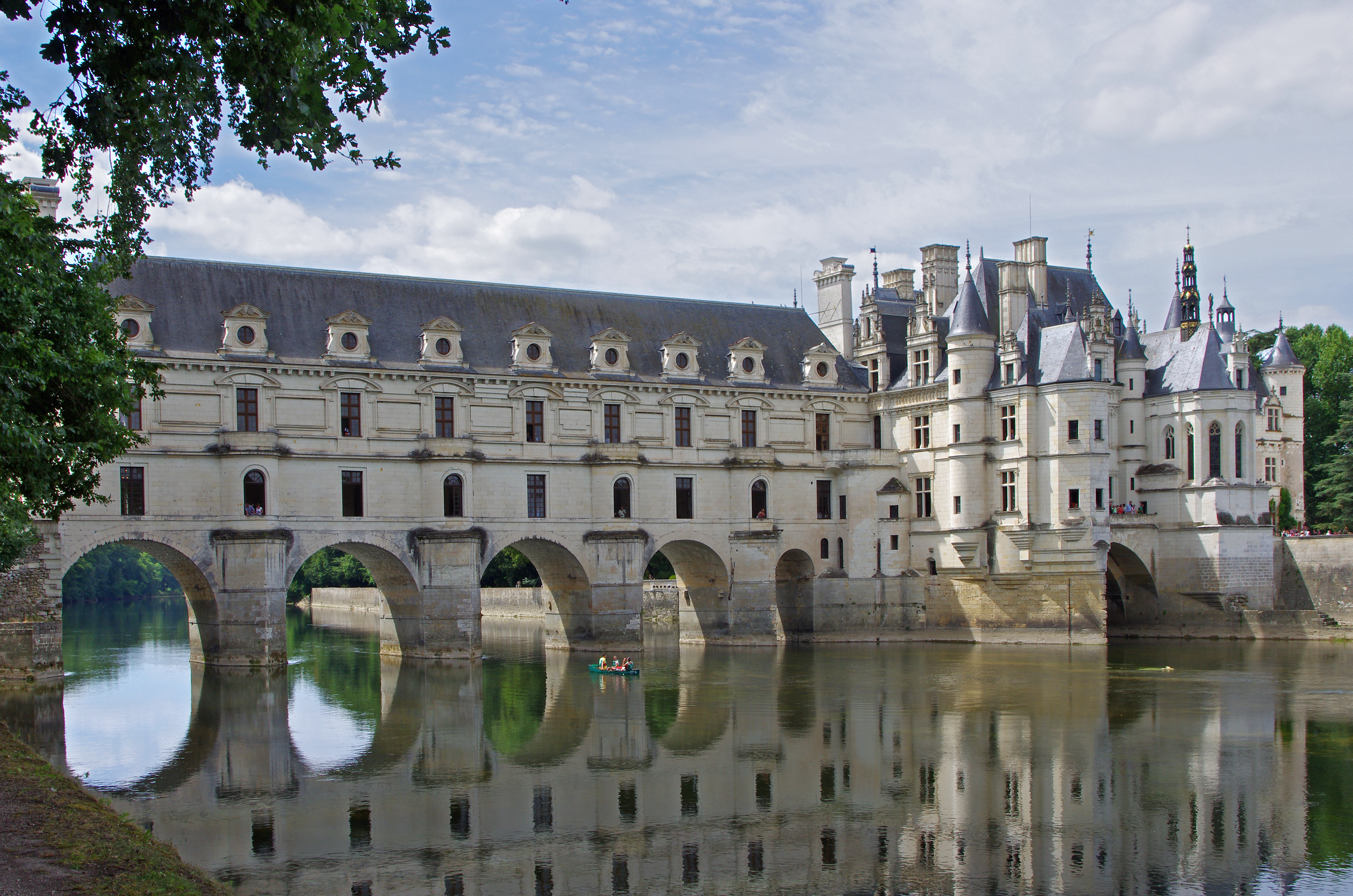
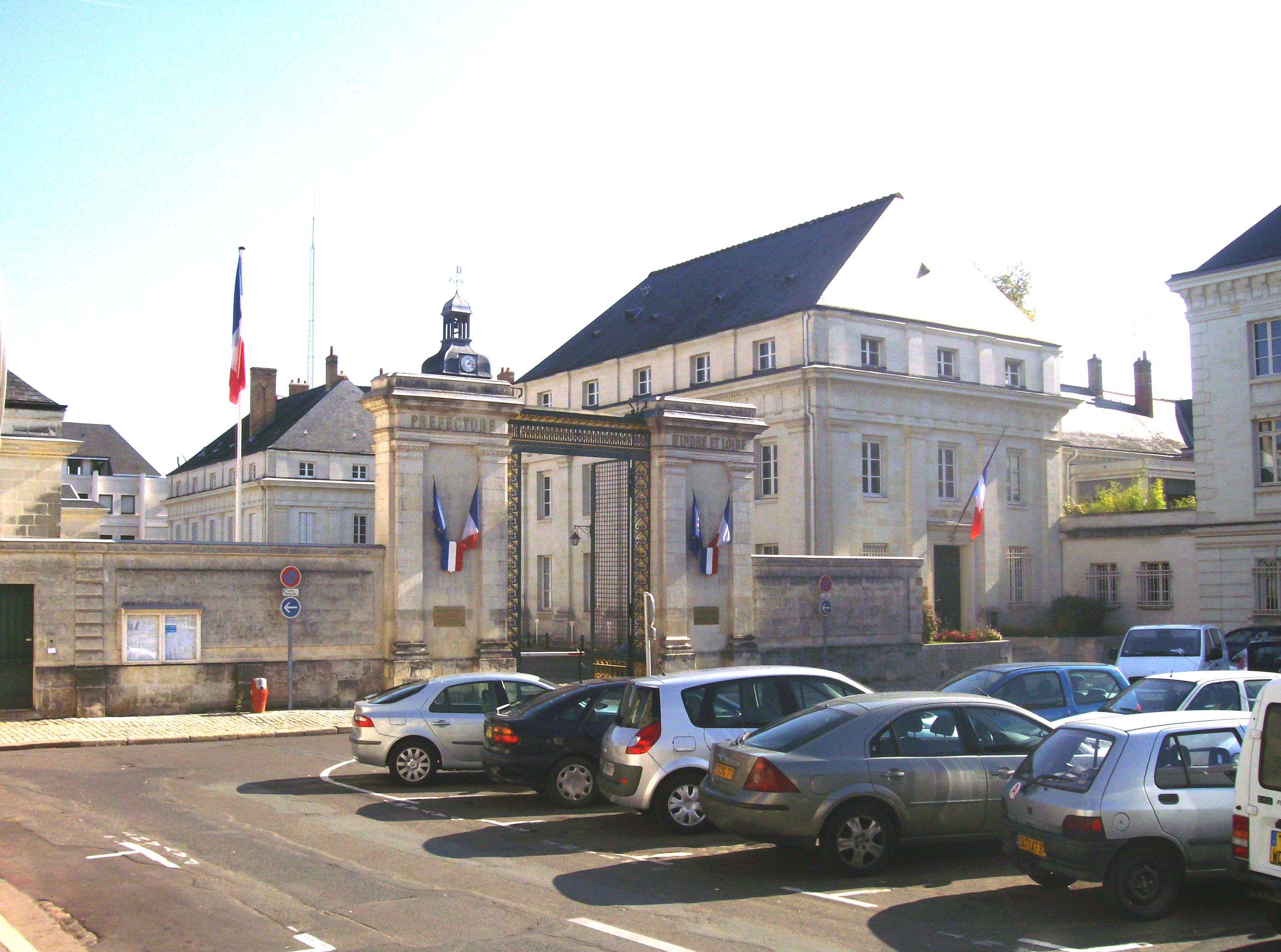
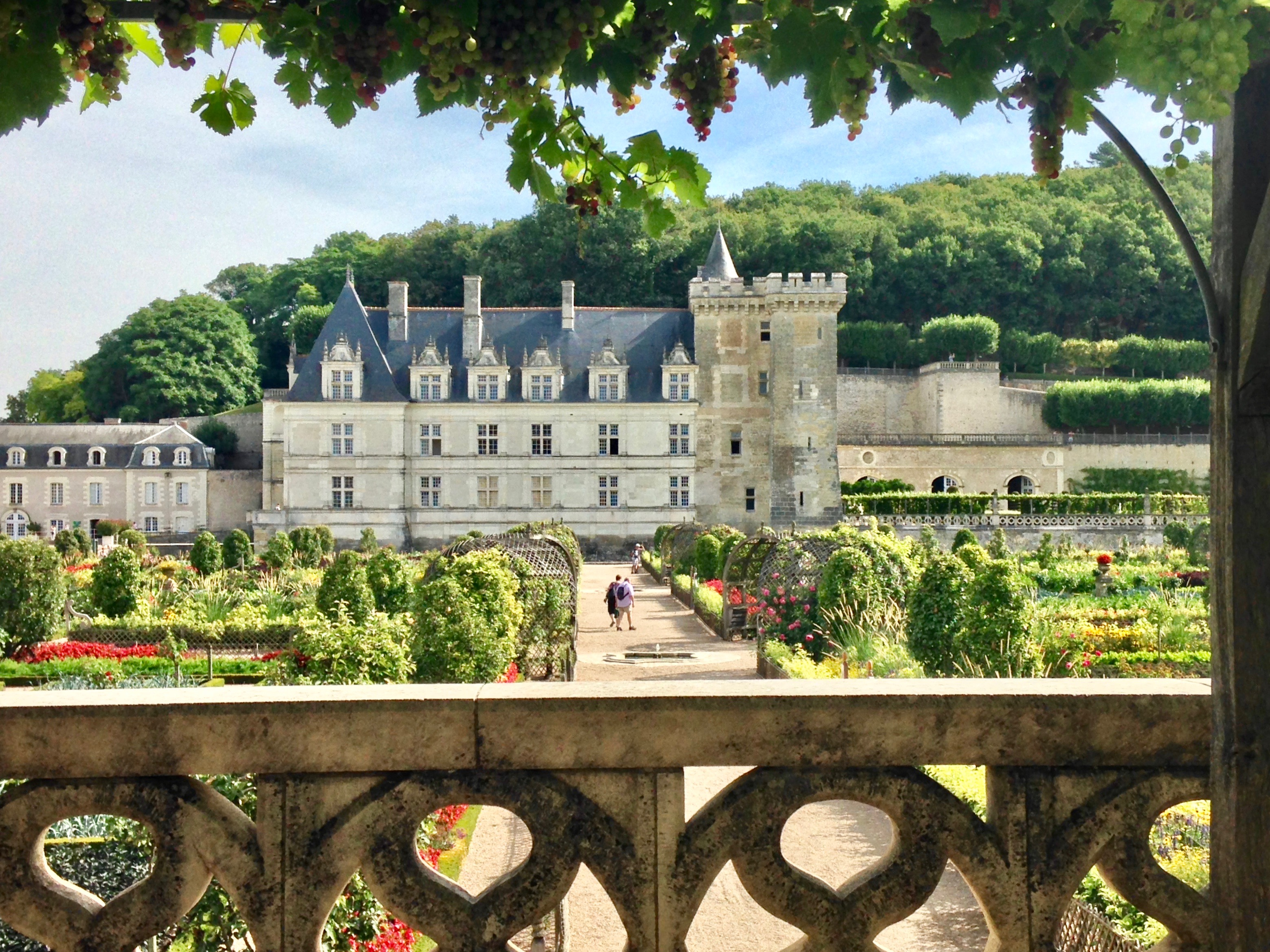
- Top down, from left to right: Château de Langeais, Chinon and the Vienne River, Château de Chenonceau and the Cher River, prefecture building in Tours, Château de Villandry

- Flag Coat of arms

- Location of Indre-et-Loire in France
- Coordinates: 47°15′N 0°40′E
- Country: France
- Region: Centre-Val de Loire
- Prefecture: Tours
- Subprefectures: Chinon; Loches

Government
  - President of the Departmental Council: Jean-Gérard Paumier (LR)

Area^{1}
  - Total: 6,127 km^{2} (2,366 sq mi)

Population (2023)
  - Total: 619,362
  - Rank: 41st
  - Density: 101.1/km^{2} (261.8/sq mi)
- Time zone: UTC+1 (CET)
  - Summer (DST): UTC+2 (CEST)
- Department number: 37
- Arrondissements: 3
- Cantons: 19
- Communes: 272
- ^1 French Land Register data, which exclude estuaries and lakes, ponds and glaciers larger than 1 km^{2}

Indre-et-Loire (French pronunciation: [ɛ̃dʁ‿elwaʁ]; lit. 'Indre and Loire') is a department in west-central France named after the rivers Indre and Loire. In 2023, it had a population of 619,362. Sometimes referred to as Touraine, the name of the historic region, it is nowadays part of the Centre-Val de Loire region. Its prefecture is Tours and subprefectures are Chinon and Loches. Indre-et-Loire is a touristic destination for its numerous monuments that are part of the Châteaux of the Loire Valley.

== History ==
=== Early times ===
Indre-et-Loire is one of the original 83 departments established during the French Revolution on 4 March 1790. It was created from the former province of Touraine and of small portions of Orléanais, Anjou and Poitou. Its prefecture, Tours, was a centre of learning in the Early Middle Ages, having been a key focus of Christian evangelisation since St Martin became its first bishop around 375. From the mid-15th century, the royal court repaired to the Loire Valley, with Tours as its capital; the confluence of the Loire River and Cher River became a centre of silk manufacturing and other luxury goods, including the wine trade, creating a prosperous bourgeoisie.

=== Recent years ===
After the creation of the department it remained politically conservative, as Honoré de Balzac recorded in several of his novels. Conservative Tours refused to welcome the railways which instead were obliged to route their lines by way of Saint-Pierre-des-Corps on the city's eastern edge. The moderate temper of the department's politics remained apparent after the Franco-Prussian War of 1870: sentiments remained predominantly pro-royalist during the early years of the Third Republic. For most of the nineteenth century, Indre-et-Loire was a rural department, but pockets of heavy-duty industrialisation began to appear towards the century's end, accompanied by left-wing politics. 1920 saw the birth of the French Communist Party at the Congress of Tours. By 1920, Saint-Pierre-des-Corps had become a major railway hub and a centre of railway workshops: it had also acquired a reputation as a bastion of working class solidarity.

== Geography ==
Indre-et-Loire is part of the region of Centre-Val de Loire; the neighbouring departments are Loir-et-Cher, Indre, Vienne, Maine-et-Loire and Sarthe.

=== Principal towns ===
The most populous commune is Tours, the prefecture. As of 2023, there are 10 communes with more than 10,000 inhabitants:

Commune	Population (2023)
Tours	139,259
Joué-lès-Tours	38,423
Saint-Cyr-sur-Loire	17,029
Saint-Pierre-des-Corps	15,898
Saint-Avertin	14,999
Amboise	12,937
Chambray-lès-Tours	12,720
Montlouis-sur-Loire	11,335
Fondettes	10,954
La Riche	10,487

== Demographics ==
Historical population

Year	Pop.	±% p.a.
1801	268,924	—
1821	282,372	+0.24%
1836	304,271	+0.50%
1851	315,641	+0.24%
1872	317,027	+0.02%
1886	340,921	+0.52%
1901	335,541	−0.11%
1911	341,205	+0.17%
1921	327,743	−0.40%
1931	335,226	+0.23%
1946	349,685	+0.28%

Year	Pop.	±% p.a.
1954	364,706	+0.53%
1962	395,210	+1.01%
1968	437,866	+1.72%
1975	478,597	+1.28%
1982	506,093	+0.80%
1990	529,345	+0.56%
1999	553,747	+0.50%
2007	583,086	+0.65%
2012	596,937	+0.47%
2017	606,511	+0.32%
2023	619,362	+0.35%

== Politics ==
The President of the Departmental Council is Jean-Gérard Paumier of The Republicans.

Party		seats
•	Socialist Party	18
	Miscellaneous Right	8
	Union for a Popular Movement	5
•	Miscellaneous Left	2
	New Centre	2
•	French Communist Party	1

=== Current national assembly representatives ===
Constituency	Member	Party
Indre-et-Loire's 1st constituency	Charles Fournier	The Ecologists
Indre-et-Loire's 2nd constituency	Daniel Labaronne	Renaissance
Indre-et-Loire's 3rd constituency	Henri Alfandari	Horizons
Indre-et-Loire's 4th constituency	Laurent Baumel	Socialist Party
Indre-et-Loire's 5th constituency	Sabine Thillaye	MoDem

== See also ==
- Cantons of the Indre-et-Loire department
- Communes of the Indre-et-Loire department
- Arrondissements of the Indre-et-Loire department
