= Parliamentary Office for the Evaluation of Scientific and Technological Choices =

The Parliamentary Office for the Evaluation of Scientific and Technological Choices (French: Office parlementaire d'évaluation des choix scientifiques et technologiques or OPECST) is responsible for informing the French Parliament of the consequences of scientific and technological choices in order to inform its decisions. It collects information, implements study programs and carries out evaluations. It plays the role of interlocutor recognized by the entire scientific community. It has thus established a partnership with the French Academy of Sciences and has a regular contact with other academies and major research organizations. Being the only parliamentary office, it is also called more briefly “Parliamentary Office” or “Office”.

== Statutes ==
OPECST is created by law n^{o} 83-609 of July 8, 1983, which provides that the Office must “inform Parliament of the consequences of choices of a scientific and technological nature, in order, in particular, to inform its decisions." This is the only common member in the National Assembly and the Senate.

The OPECST is made up of eighteen deputies and eighteen senators, appointed in such a way as to ensure proportional representation of the political groups. These deputies and senators are appointed by their political group and not co-opted by the members of the Office.

The Office is chaired, alternatively, by a member of one or the other assembly for a period of three years, the first vice-president belonging to the other assembly.

It has a scientific council of 24 "high-level personalities", chosen for their skills in scientific and technological questions.

== Themes addressed ==
The problems addressed by the OPECST are divided into five main themes:

- The power and energy policy
- The environment and natural risks
- The new technology
- The life sciences (bioethics, health, etc.) and biotechnology (GMOs, synthetic biology, etc.).
- Research and innovation policy and the science & society interface.

Certain files have been renewed for several years in a row, for example those related to nuclear energy and waste management through the regular evaluation of the National Plan for the Management of Radioactive Materials and Waste (PNGMDR).

In recent years, the Office has also been dealing with topical issues through a public hearing open to the press, which allows all the stakeholders concerned to be brought together quickly.

Reports published from January 1, 2017, to June 30, 2018
Published in	Name of the report	Report by
March 2017	For a controlled, useful and demystified artificial intelligence; (French: Pour une intelligence artificielle maîtrisée, utile et démystifiée)	Claude de Ganay, deputy; Dominique Gillot, senator
March 2017	Assessment of the National Radioactive Materials and Waste Management Plan 2016-2018; (French: L'évaluation du Plan national de gestion des matières et déchets radioactifs 2016-2018)	Christian Bataille, deputy; Christian Namy, senator
March 2017	The safety of nuclear pressure equipment; (French: La sûreté des équipements sous pression nucléaire)	Jean-Yves Le Déaut, deputy; Bruno Sido, senator
March 2017	The contribution of innovation and scientific and technological assessment to the implementation of COP21 decisions; (French: L'apport de l'innovation et de l'évaluation scientifique et technologique à la mise en œuvre des décisions de la COP21)	Jean-Yves Le Déaut, deputy; Bruno Sido, senator
March 2017	Assessment of the national energy research strategy; (French: L'évaluation de la stratégie nationale de recherche en énergie)	Anne-Yvonne Le Dain, MP
March 2017	The evaluation of the national research strategy “France Europe 2020”; (French: L'évaluation de la stratégie nationale de recherche « France Europe 2020 »)	Jean-Yves Le Déaut, deputy; Bruno Sido, senator
April 2017	The economic, environmental, health and ethical issues of biotechnologies in the light of new avenues of research; (French: Les enjeux économiques, environnementaux, sanitaires et éthiques des biotechnologies à la lumière des nouvelles pistes de recherche)	Jean-Yves Le Déaut, deputy; Catherine Procaccia, senator
February 2018	The challenges of smart meters; (French: Les enjeux des compteurs communicants)	Cédric Villani, deputy; Célia de Lavergne, deputy; Gérard Longuet, senator
February 2018	Algorithms at the service of public action: the case of the post-baccalaureate admission portal; (French: Les algorithmes au service de l'action publique: le cas du portail admission post-bac)	Cédric Villani, deputy; Gérard Longuet, senator
June 2018	Understanding blockchains: operation and challenges of these new technologies; (French: Comprendre les blockchains: fonctionnement et enjeux de ces nouvelles technologies)	Valéria Faure-Muntian, deputy; Claude de Ganay, deputy; Ronan Le Gleut, senator
June 2018	How is electromagnetic hypersensitivity taken into account?; (French: Comprendre les blockchains: fonctionnement et enjeux de ces nouvelles technologies)	Cédric Villani, deputy; Gérard Longuet, senator

== Mission on "nuclear security, instead of the industry and its future" ==
In March 2011, OPECST, then chaired by deputy Claude Birraux, was jointly seized by the Office of the National Assembly and by the committee of economy, sustainable development and spatial planning of the Senate, following the events of Fukushima, of a study on "nuclear security, the place of the nuclear industry and its future". (Note: The report: Bataille, Christian; Sido, Bruno (2011-12-15) Rapport de la mission parlementaire sur la sécurité nucléaire, la place de la filière et son avenir (in French) Retrieved 2021-10-03)

During its meeting of March 30, 2011, the Office appointed two reporters responsible for this study:

- Christian Bataille (SOC., Nord), deputy.
- Bruno Sido (UMP, Haute-Marne), then first vice-president of the Office, senator.

During its first meeting on April 14, 2011, the parliamentary mission decided on a work program: open hearings to the press, trips to nuclear sites and trips abroad (Germany, Japan). Two unannounced checks, at the Paluel plant and at the Blayais plant, were also carried out.

The proposed long-term strategy would allow an optimal adjustment of each sector, and a gradual reduction, in parallel with the maturation of storage technologies which will make it possible to manage the intermittence of renewable energies without increasing CO_{2} emissions, the share of nuclear power in French electricity production.

The share of nuclear production would thus drop from around 75% today to “50 or 60% around 2050”, by not replacing one in two end-of-life reactors, in favor of EPR reactors. The decision to shut down a reactor would be left to ASN, whose necessary independence is underlined.

== Controversy ==
The independence of the OPECST on nuclear-related issues has long been questioned by environmentalists, including Michèle Rivasi, socialist related MP for Drôme from 1998 to 2002 and founder of CRIIRAD, who claimed to have had a "lot of difficulties to be admitted to sit on the Office" and declared in particular: "One cannot imagine to what extent the nuclear lobby permeates the work of the Office." (Note: Michèle Rivasi on nuclear lobying: “Nuclear energy, the need for checks and balances. Interview with Michèle Rivasi”, Hérodote , vol. 100, no. 1, 2001, pp. 109-119.)

However, a national radioactive waste management plan to improve the readability and overall effectiveness of the initiatives of the public authorities and the various operators, central proposal of Michèle Rivasi's report relating to the consequences of storage of nuclear waste on health, had been implemented. In fact, following its report, a 2006 law known as the “Birraux law” created a legal framework for the establishment of a National Radioactive Materials and Waste Management Plan (PNGMDR). The first PNGMDR was released in 2007, and the second in 2010.

In 2021, physicist and engineer Sébastien Point denounced the recommendations formulated by the OPECST, then chaired by the mathematician and deputy Cédric Villani, to recognize the use of geobiology pseudoscience (not to be confused with scientific geobiology) to address certain health issues in the agricultural world, despite its nature. The physicist qualified geobiology as a "charlatan network" and "a profitable business which seems to find political relays".

== Composition of the Parliamentary Office ==
As of October 2021:

Name	Function	Committees	Parliamentary group	Constituency
Cédric Villani	President	Economic affairs	Europe Ecology - The Greens	Essonne 5th
Gérard Longuet (Senator)	First Vice-president	Finance	The Republicans	Meuse 1st
Didier Baichère	Vice-president	Social affairs	La République En Marche!	Yvelines 1st
Jean-Luc Fugit	Vice-president	Sustainable development	La République En Marche!	Rhône 11th
Patrick Hetzel	Vice-president	Finance	The Republicans	Bas-Rhin 7th
Sonia de La Provôté (Senator)	Vice-president	Culture, education and communication	Centrist Union	Calvados 1st
Angèle Préville (Senator)	Vice-president	Regional planning and sustainable development	Socialist, Ecologist and Republican	Lot 1st
Catherine Procaccia (Senator)	Vice-president	Social affairs	The Republicans	
Julien Aubert		Finance	The Republicans	Vaucluse 5th
Philippe Bolo		Economic affairs	Democratic Movement and related Democrats	Maine-et-Loire 7th
Émilie Cariou		Finance	Europe Ecology - The Greens	Meuse 2nd
Laure Darcos (Senator)		Culture, education and communication	The Republicans	
Annie Delmont-Koropoulis (Senator)		Social affairs	The Republicans	
Jean-François Eliaou		Laws	La République En Marche!	Hérault 4th
Valéria Faure-Muntian		Finance	La République En Marche!	Loire 3rd
Claude de Ganay		Defense	The Republicans	Loiret 3rd
Thomas Gassilloud		Defense	Agir ensemble	Rhône 10th
Anne Genetet		Foreign affairs	La République En Marche!	
André Guiol (Senator)		Foreign affairs, defense and the Armed Forces	European Democratic and Social Rally	
Ludovic Haye (Senator)		Constitutional laws, legislation, universal suffrage and general administration	La République En Marche! group	
Olivier Henno (Senator)		Social affairs	Centrist Union	
Pierre Henriet		Cultural affairs and education	La République En Marche!	Vendée 5th
Antoine Herth		Economic affairs	Agir ensemble	Bas-Rhin 5th
Annick Jacquemet (Senator)		Social affairs	Centrist Union	
Bernard Jomier (Senator)		Social affairs	Socialist, Ecologist and Republican	
Florence Lassarade (Senator)		Social affairs	The Republicans	
Ronan Le Gleut (Senator)		Foreign affairs, defense and the Armed Forces	The Republicans	
Jean-Paul Lecoq		Foreign affairs	Democratic and Republican Left	Seine-Maritime 8th
Gérard Leseul		Sustainable development	Socialist and allies	Seine-Maritime 5th
Pierre Médevielle (Senator)		Regional planning and sustainable development	The Independents - Republic and Territories	
Michelle Meunier (Senator)		Social affairs	Socialist, Ecologist and Republican	
Pierre Ouzoulias (Senator)		Culture, education and communication	Communist, Republican, Citizen and Ecologist	
Stéphane Piednoir (Senator)		Culture, education and communication	The Republicans	
Loïc Prud'homme		Sustainable development	La France Insoumise	Gironde 3rd
Bruno Sido (Senator)		Foreign affairs, defense and the Armed Forces	The Republicans	
Huguette Tiegna		Economic affairs	La République En Marche!	Lot 2nd
