= François-Xavier Bellamy =

French politician (born 1985)

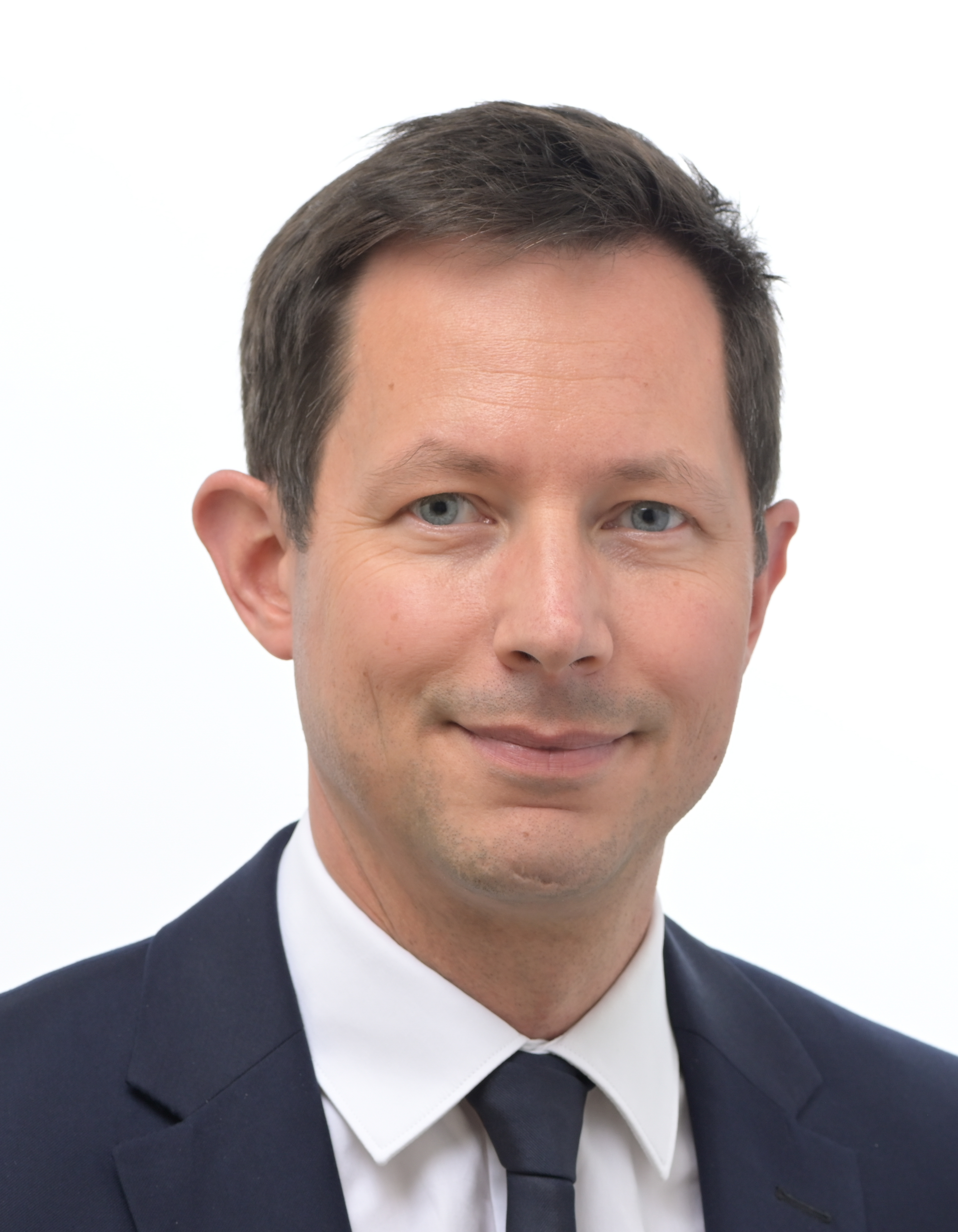
- Official portrait, 2024

Vice-Chair of the European People's Party in the European Parliament
- Incumbent
- Assumed office 19 June 2024
- Chair: Manfred Weber
- Serving alongside: Andrzej Halicki; Jeroen Lenaers; Dolors Montserrat; Siegfried Mureșan; Lídia Pereira; Massimiliano Salini; Tomas Tobé; Romana Tomc; Željana Zovko
- Preceded by: See list: Arnaud Danjean; Frances Fitzgerald; Rasa Juknevičienė; Jeroen Lenaers; Vangelis Meimarakis; Dolors Montserrat; Siegfried Mureşan; Jan Olbrycht; Željana Zovko; Lídia Pereira

Executive Vice President of The Republicans
- Incumbent
- Assumed office 18 February 2023
- President: Éric Ciotti; Bruno Retailleau
- Preceded by: Aurélien Pradié

Member of the European Parliament
- Incumbent
- Assumed office 2 July 2019
- Constituency: France

Municipal councillor of Versailles
- In office 21 March 2008 – 28 June 2020
- Mayor: François de Mazières

Personal details
- Born: 11 October 1985 (age 40) Paris, France
- Party: The Republicans (since 2019)
- Education: Lycée Henri-IV
- Alma mater: École normale supérieure Paris-Sorbonne University; University of Cambridge

François-Xavier Bellamy (French: [fʁɑ̃swa ɡzavje belami]; born 11 October 1985) is a French essayist, high-school teacher and politician. He is a former Deputy Mayor of Versailles (2008–2019) and is now a Member of the European Parliament (2019–present), having led The Republicans (LR) list in the 2019 and 2024 elections.

Since 2023, he has been LR's executive vice president under Éric Ciotti and Bruno Retailleau.

== Early life and education ==
François-Xavier Bellamy was born in 1985 in Paris.

Bellamy was educated at the École Sainte-Marie des Bourdonnais, a private school in Versailles. After two-years preparatory classes (A/L) in the Lycée Henri-IV, he was admitted to École normale supérieure in 2005. He earned the agrégation in philosophy in 2008.

== Early career ==
Bellamy taught philosophy at the Lycée Sainte-Geneviève and the Lycée Notre-Dame de Grandchamp in Versailles in 2008. In 2009, he taught at the Lycée Auguste Renoir in Asnières-sur-Seine, the Lycée Louis Bascan in Rambouillet and the Lycée hôtelier in Guyancourt. Since 2011, he has been teaching philosophy and art history for the preparatory classes at the Lycée Blomet in Paris.

Bellamy is the author of four books. He won the Prix d'Aumale from the Académie Française in 2014 for his first book, Les déshérités ou l'urgence de transmettre. In this essay, he analyses the failure of the French educational system as the result of an ideology that refuses the transmission of culture, thus creating disinherited students.

== Political career ==
=== Career in local politics ===
Bellamy was deputy mayor in Versailles for employment, youth and higher education.

He was a candidate for the National Assembly elections in Yvelines's 1st constituency in 2017, invested by The Republicans, but he lost in the second round against the candidate of En Marche!, Didier Baichère with 48.9% vs 51.1% of the votes.

=== Member of the European Parliament, 2019–present ===
Since May 2019, Bellamy has been a Member of the European Parliament for the EPP. In parliament, he is a member of the Committee on Fisheries (PECH) and the Committee on Industry, Research and Energy (ITRE).

In addition to his committee assignments, Bellamy is part of the Inter-Parliamentary Alliance on China.

== Political positions ==
Ahead of the Republicans' 2022 convention, Bellamy endorsed Bruno Retailleau as the party's chairman. During the 2024 French legislative election, he stated that he would support the far-right Rassemblement national in a second-round contest against the left-wing New Popular Front.

In a joint letter initiated by Norbert Röttgen and Anthony Gonzalez ahead of the 47th G7 summit in 2021, Bellamy joined some 70 legislators from Europe and the US in calling upon their leaders to take a tough stance on China and to "avoid becoming dependent" on the country for technology including artificial intelligence and 5G. He voted no in the 2005 French European Constitution referendum.

Bellamy has been a member of the French anti gay marriage movement from its modern inception. He opposed extending the right to assisted reproductive technology to lesbian couples. He opposes abortion.

In the Republicans' 2025 leadership election, Bellamy again endorsed Bruno Retailleau to succeed Éric Ciotti as the party's new chair.

== Works ==
- Bellamy, Francois-Xavier (2018). Demeurer. Paris: Grasset. ISBN 978-2246815587.
- Bellamy, François-Xavier (2014). Les déshérités ou l'urgence de transmettre. Paris: Plon. ISBN 9782259223430. OCLC 898168580.
- Bellamy, François-Xavier (2016). A la jeunesse : De Saint-Exupéry à Steve Jobs, de grandes voix appellent à vivre intensément. Paris: Librio. ISBN 9782290120613.
- Bellamy, Francois-Xavier (2016). Éduquer avec Rousseau : conférence à destination des parlementaires prononcée le 20 mai 2015. Paris: SOS Éducation. ISBN 9791093981123. OCLC 958253810.
