= Results of the 2024 French legislative election in Lot =

Following the first round of the 2024 French legislative election on 30 June 2024, runoff elections in each constituency where no candidate received a vote share greater than 50 percent were scheduled for 7 July. Candidates permitted to stand in the runoff elections needed to either come in first or second place in the first round or achieve more than 12.5 percent of the votes of the entire electorate (as opposed to 12.5 percent of the vote share due to low turnout).

== Lot ==
=== 1st constituency ===
Candidate	Party or alliance		First round		Second round	
Candidate	Party or alliance		Votes	%	Votes	%
Aurélien Pradié	The Republicans	Miscellaneous right	22,180	42.25	28,049	53.78
Elsa Bougeard	New Popular Front	La France Insoumise	12,775	24.33	12,129	23.26
Slavka Mihaylova	National Rally		12,108	23.06	11,975	22.96
Frédéric Decremps	Ensemble	Renaissance	4,689	8.93		
François Tesson	Reconquête		398	0.76		
Ghislain Domenech	Far-left	Lutte Ouvrière	353	0.67		
Total			52,503	100.00	52,153	100.00
Valid votes			52,503	97.81	52,153	97.90
Invalid votes			575	1.07	423	0.79
Blank votes			598	1.11	698	1.31
Total votes			53,676	100.00	53,274	100.00
Registered voters/turnout			73,047	73.48	73,051	72.93

=== 2nd constituency ===
Candidate	Party or alliance		First round		Second round	
Candidate	Party or alliance		Votes	%	Votes	%
Christophe Proenca	New Popular Front	Socialist Party	18,079	38.22	22,374	46.83
Gérard Raymond Blanchet	National Rally		14,369	30.38	15,531	32.51
Huguette Tiegna	Ensemble	Renaissance	12,752	26.96	9,870	20.66
Daniel Paget	Independent		1,237	2.62		
Marie-Michèle Viau	Far-left	Lutte Ouvrière	607	1.28		
Rabah Bouguerra	Miscellaneous left	Independent	259	0.55		
Total			47,303	100.00	47,775	100.00
Valid votes			47,303	95.96	47,775	96.11
Invalid votes			880	1.79	692	1.39
Blank votes			1,114	2.26	1,242	2.50
Total votes			49,297	100.00	49,709	100.00
Registered voters/turnout			66,320	74.33	66,321	74.95
