= Valéria Faure-Muntian =

French politician

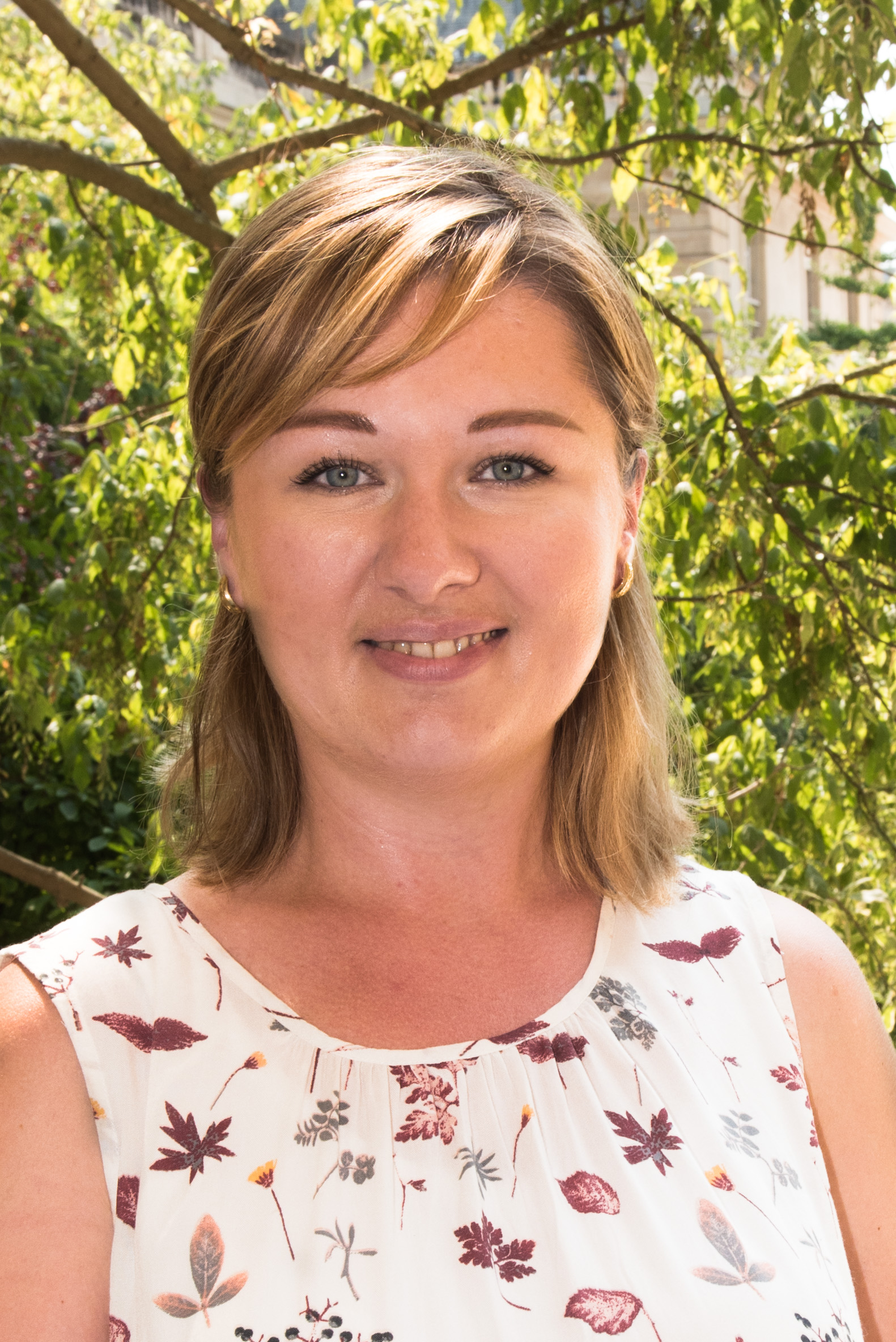

Member of the National Assembly for Loire's 3rd constituency
- In office 21 June 2017 – 2022
- Preceded by: François Rochebloine
- Succeeded by: Emmanuel Mandon

Personal details
- Born: 2 September 1984 (age 42) Kiliya, Ukraine
- Party: Renaissance
- Education: University of Franche-Comté

Valéria Faure-Muntian (born 2 September 1984) is a French politician of Renaissance who served as a member of the French National Assembly from 2017 to 2022, representing the 3rd constituency of the department of Loire.

== Political career ==
In Parliament, Faure-Muntian served on the Committee on Foreign Affairs and the Parliamentary Office for the Evaluation of Scientific and Technological Choices (OPECST). In addition to her committee assignments, she chaired the French-Ukrainian Parliamentary Friendship Group. She was also part of the French delegation to the Parliamentary Assembly of the Black Sea Economic Cooperation.

Faure-Muntian did not seek re-election in the 2022 French legislative election.

== Political positions ==
In July 2019, Faure-Muntian voted in favor of the French ratification of the European Union’s Comprehensive Economic and Trade Agreement (CETA) with Canada.

== See also ==
- 2017 French legislative election
