= Lycée Blomet =

School in Paris, France

École Normale Catholique
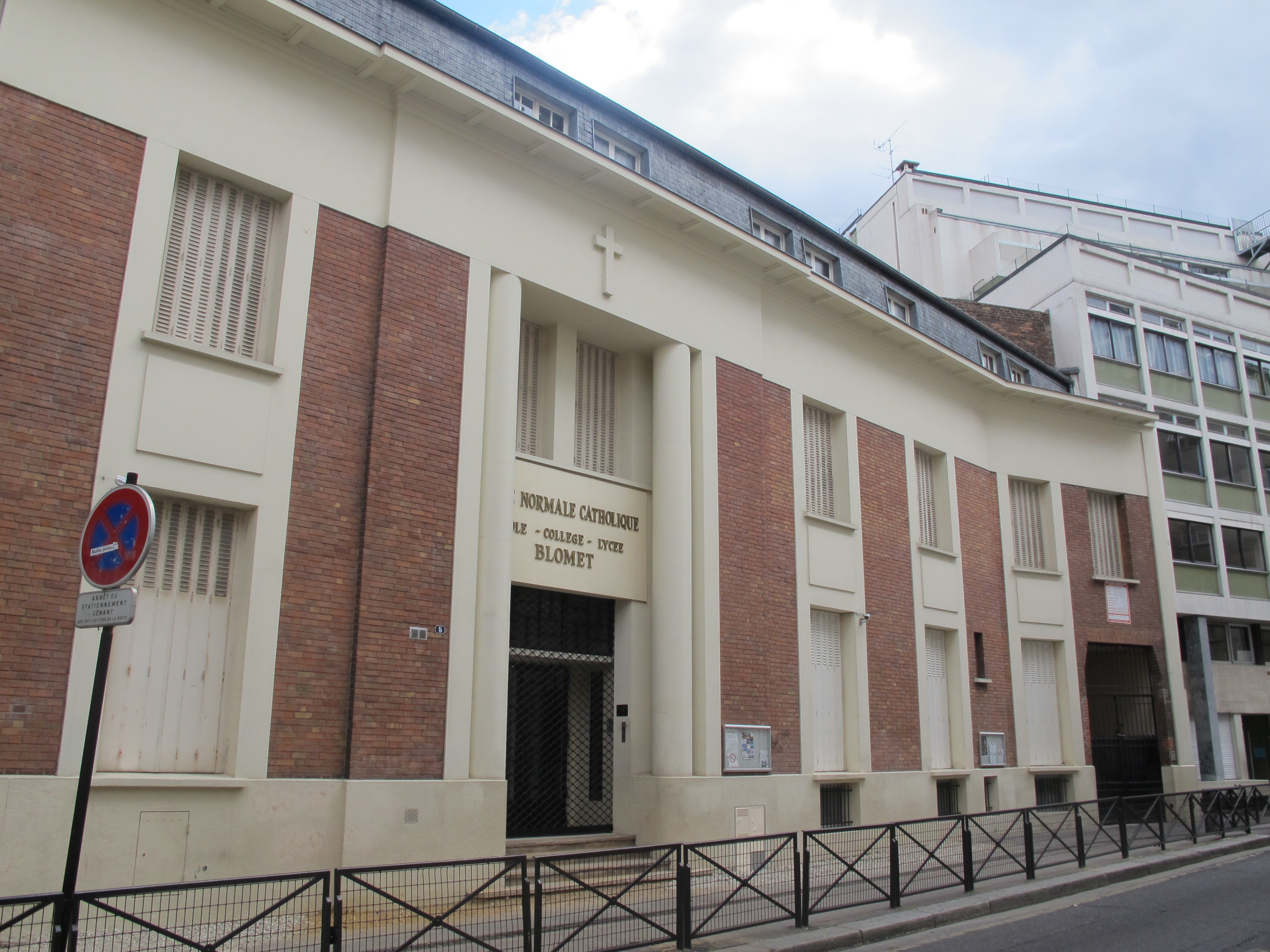

Location
- 5, rue Blomet, Paris; France
- 48.843935°N 2.308829°E

Information
- Other name: Lycée ENC Blomet
- Type: private catholic school under contract with the State
- Motto: "Être et non paraître" ("To be and not to appear")
- Established: 1906
- Director: Ecole ENC Saint Jean : Elsa Thuayre Ecole ENC Blomet : Marie-Ange Hassoun; Collège : Laure de Saint Louvent; Lycée : Elsa Le Gloannec CPGE : Éric Barbier
- President: Guillaume Périlleux
- Head of school: Alexis Molio
- Grades: Preschool (École ENC Blomet and École ENC Saint-Jean); Primary (École ENC Blomet and École ENC Saint-Jean); Secondary (Collège/Lycée ENC Blomet); Classe Préparatoire aux Grandes Écoles (Tertiary education)
- Language: French, English, Spanish, German, Italian, Chinese
- Website: www.blomet-enc.fr

The École Normale Catholique (ENC), also known as the Lycée Blomet, is a private school founded in 1906 by teacher Louise Desrez. Since 1933, it has been located at 5 rue Blomet, in the 15th arrondissement of Paris.

== History ==
=== Foundation (1906–1952) ===
The École Normale Catholique was born in the context of anti-clericalism which marked the start of the 20th Century in France. The law of 7 July 1904 introduced by Émile Combes meant the dissolution of Catholic religious houses, forcing them to move to other European countries. In this atmosphere, there also came the 1905 French law on the Separation of the Churches and the State, leading Mlle Desrez, teacher, and friend of Madeleine Daniélou, to decide in 1906 to create a normal school to fill the gap in girls' education and to teach Christian teachers. It was located at 90 rue de Rennes, initially for primary education, but its development led to growth, and the ENC moved to 159 rue de Sèvres.

From its origin, Louise Desrez surrounded herself with teachers and trainees, mostly from the Institut catholique de Paris or the Collège Stanislas de Paris. In 1922, Mlle Marguerite Eymard succeeded Mlle Desrez, after working as her assistant. Due to the precarious lease on the building in rue de Sèvres, the construction of a new building was decided upon. Jean Verdier, archbishop of Paris inaugurated the new school on 20 December 1934. The ENC also built an annexe on rue Olivier-de-Serres in 1939: the école Saint-Jean was born.

=== The Jesuit era (1952–present) ===
In 1952, the headteacher, Mlle Marguerite, appealed to the Society of Jesus, to ensure the sustainability of their work. The ENC specifically worked with the Society of Jesus Christ, a Jesuit teaching congregation who already ran the écoles Chevreul in Lyon and Marseille and who practiced Ignatian pedagogy. Mlle Deshaires took over the running of the school.

In 1988, the establishment, then equipped with a college and a lycée, started to offer classes préparatoires aux grandes écoles in literature. In 2003, the Society of Jesus Christ joined with the Sisters of the Company of Mary, Our Lady.

In September 2015, a new law stream in preparatory class D1 was opened in partnership with the université Panthéon-Assas, mostly preparing students for the ENS Cachan but also for civil service entrance examinations, and allowing them to access law studies at university.

== Controversies ==
On June 24, 2026, an investigation published by France Info revealed the passive approach taken by the administration of preparatory classes in addressing instances of harassment of a racist, anti-Semitic, and sexist nature. Beyond the remarks revealed by victims’ testimonies, the article also highlights “the recurring presence of symbols associated with the radical far right or neo-Nazi ideology.” According to the investigation, the local education authority stated that it “had not, to [its] knowledge, received any reports from the Catholic Teacher Training College.”

In an email sent to students and their parents following the publication of the journalistic investigation, the school stated that it had received “no reports” of a widespread climate of discrimination within the preparatory classes [...] during the 2023–2024 school year.

== Administration ==
=== Head of School ===
- 1906-1923 : Louise Desrez
- 1923-1952 : Marguerite Eymard
- 1952-1956 : Mlle Deshaires
- 1956-1975 : Mlle Guérin
- 1975- ? : Mlle Roch
- ?-1987 : Melle Marin
- ?-? : Melle Deveaux
- ?-2006 : Mme Moeller
- 2006-2013 : Philipe Cléac'h
- 2013-2018 : Gonzague de Monicault
- 2018-2019 : Michel Belledent
- 2019-2022 : Anthony Bardoux
- since 2022 : Alexis Molio

== Notable Alumni of ENC Blomet ==
=== Current and Former teachers ===
- François-Xavier Bellamy: philosophy teacher in preparatory classes, French politician and essayist.
- Madeleine Bazin de Jessey: graduate of the École Normale Supérieure, certified teacher of Classical Literature, and Ph.D. in French and Comparative Literature.

=== Alumni ===
- Guillaume Peltier: French teacher and politician, who attended the preparatory classes
- Marc de Cacqueray-Valménier: French neo-Nazi activist, who attended the preparatory classes

== Teaching ==
=== Preschool and primary school ===
==== École ENC Blomet ====
The école Blomet is one of the two preschool (called maternelle) and primary school (called élémentaire) of the ENC. It has around 400 students, girls and boys split into 4 kindergarten and 10 primary classes.

==== École ENC Saint-Jean ====
There is also a separate site on rue Olivier-de-Serres, in Paris, the école Saint-Jean is still part of the ENC. Saint-Jean is the second preschool and primary school of the ENC. The school has close to 350 students in 13 classes.

=== Secondary school ===
==== Middle school (Collège) ====
The ENC's middle school (called collège) 700 secondary students at the establishment are in 6 classes for each level, 24 classes in total. The college is ranked 2nd nationally by Le Figaro in 2022; 1st in 2023.

==== High school (Lycée) ====
The ENC's highschool (called lycée) has close to 500 students in 15 classes with 5 classes per level. The lycée prepares students for the baccalauréat général and teaches seven specialty courses :

- Mathematics
- Life and Earth Sciences (biology)
- Physics-chemistry
- Humanities, literature and philosophy
- History, geography, geopolitics and political science
- English and Contemporary World
- Economic and social science

It is also important to note that the high school has a European Section.

=== Classes Préparatoires aux Grandes Écoles ===
The preparatory classes (Tertiary education) of the ENC are composed of around 200 students in 3 streams:

- The Khâgne :
  - 2 classes of hypokhâgne (first year) : class HK1 (theatre option) and class HK2 (art history option)
  - khâgne (2nd year)
- The ENS D1 preparatory classes : law-economics-business studies (1st and 2nd years), in partnership with the Université Panthéon-Assas;
- The ENS D2 preparatory classes : economics-business studies (1st and 2nd years), a licence in international relations and modern languages which is a double diploma with the Université Laval in Québec, offered in part at Blomet, to prepare for courses at Celsa, Dauphine, Instituts d'études politiques, etc.

The preparatory classes at Blomet since 2017 have moved to a new location at 3 rue Barthélémy, in the 15th arrondissement of Paris. It is attracting a growing number of students, and is in an attractive location close to the Breteuil, and preparing for literary or D1 classes.
