= Charles Rodwell =

French politician (born 1996)

Member of the National Assembly for Yvelines's 1st constituency
- Incumbent
- Assumed office 22 June 2022
- Preceded by: Didier Baichère

Personal details
- Born: 26 June 1996 (age 30) London, England
- Party: Agir
- Education: Sciences Po; London School of Economics

Charles Rodwell (French pronunciation: [ʃaʁl(ə) ʁɔdwɛl]; born 26 June 1996) is a French politician of Agir who has represented the 1st constituency of Yvelines in the National Assembly since 2022.

== Early life ==
Rodwell was born in London to a British father and French mother. He grew up in Versailles.

== Political career ==
Rodwell was elected to the National Assembly in Yvelines's 1st constituency in the 2022 French legislative election; at the time, he was – alongside Louis Margueritte and Charles Sitzenstuhl – one of three former staff members of Bruno Le Maire who moved from the Ministry of Economics and Finance to parliament.

In parliament, Rodwell has since been serving on the Committee on Economic Affairs. In this capacity, he served as the parliament's rapporteur on measures aimed at attracting foreign businesses to expand in France in 2023. In 2026, Prime Minister Sébastien Lecornu asked him and two other parliamentarians from his center-right coalition – Christophe Plassard and Jean-Louis Thiériot – to report on France’s economic-security policies and those of its European partners, with particular attention to foreign investment screening.

In addition to his committee assignments, Rodwell is part of the French parliamentary friendship groups with Côte d'Ivoire, Cameroon, and Ethiopia.

== Political positions ==
Rodwell is considered to be part of his parliamentary group's conservative wing.

== See also ==
- List of deputies of the 16th National Assembly of France
