= Charles Sitzenstuhl =

French politician

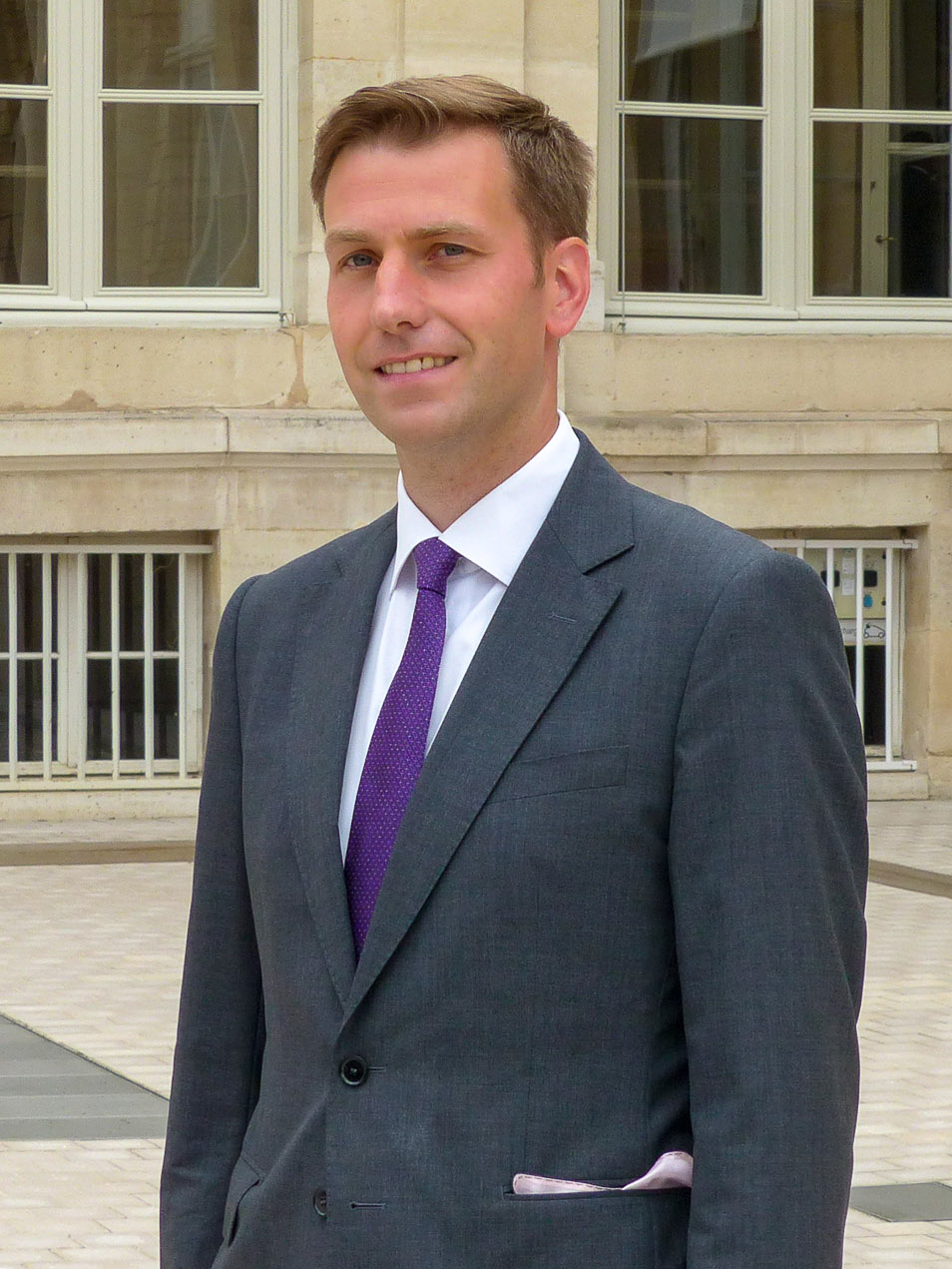

Member of the National Assembly for Bas-Rhin's 5th constituency
- Incumbent
- Assumed office 22 June 2022
- Preceded by: Antoine Herth

Personal details
- Born: 3 December 1988 (age 37) Sélestat, Bas-Rhin, France
- Party: Agir
- Other political affiliations: Renaissance
- Education: University of Strasbourg, Sciences Po
- Occupation: Politician

Charles Sitzenstuhl (born 3 December 1988) is a French politician of Agir who has been member of the National Assembly for Bas-Rhin's 5th constituency since 2022.

== Early career ==
From May 2017 to September 2021, Sitzenstuhl worked as political advisor to French Finance Minister Bruno Le Maire. In 2018, he was part of the French delegation negotiating a roadmap for the future of the eurozone with Germany’s Minister of Finance Olaf Scholz.

In 2020, Sitzenstuhl published La golf blanche, an autobiographic novel about a child experiencing domestic violence.

== Political career ==
Sitzenstuhl became a member of the National Assembly in 2022; at the time, he was – alongside Louis Margueritte and Charles Rodwell – one of three former staff members of Bruno Le Maire who moved from the Ministry of Economics and Finance to parliament.

In parliament, Sitzenstuhl has since been serving on the Finance Committee. In 2022, he was – alongside Daniel Labaronne and Matthieu Lefèvre – part of a parliamentary taskforce asked by Le Maire to identify ways to reduce the national budget.

In addition to his committee assignments, Sitzenstuhl is part of the French delegation to the Franco-German Parliamentary Assembly.

In 2023, Sitzenstuhl resigned as one of the Renaissance group’s spokespeople.

== See also ==
- List of deputies of the 16th National Assembly of France
