= Huguette Tiegna =

French politician

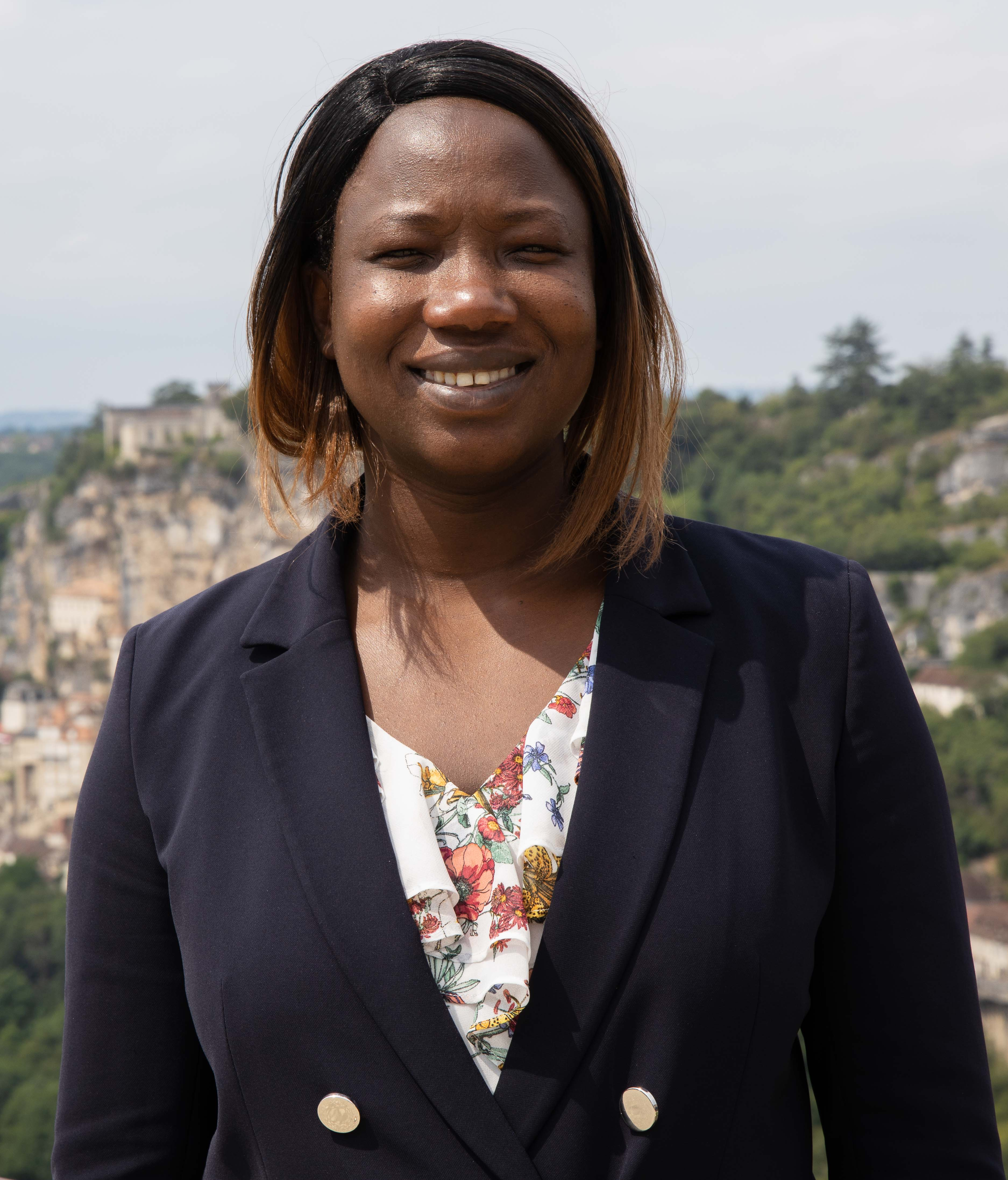

Member of the National Assembly for Lot's 2nd constituency
- In office 21 June 2017 – 9 June 2024
- Preceded by: Jean Launay
- Succeeded by: Christophe Proença

Personal details
- Born: 20 July 1987 (age 39) Bangassogo, Kiembara Department, Sourou Province, Burkina Faso
- Party: En Marche
- Education: Higher Institute of Mining, Industry and Geology

Huguette Tiegna (born 1 April 1982) is a French engineer and politician of La République En Marche! (LREM) who served as a member of the French National Assembly from 2017 to 2024, representing the department of Lot.

== Early life ==
Originally from Burkina Faso, she obtained an engineering degree in electrical engineering from the Higher Institute of Mining, Industry and Geology (EMIG) in Niger. She arrived in France in 2009, in Le Havre. In 2012, she received a scientific prize for her research work on axial flux motors. In 2013, she defended a doctoral thesis, directed by Professor Georges Barakat, at the Le Havre Normandy University on permanent magnet synchronous machines and their practical applications for wind energy.

She is an R&D engineer in electrical engineering, and worked for the company Whylot in Cambes, where she designed motors for wind turbines.

== Political career ==
Tiegna joined La République en Marche, a party created by Emmanuel Macron, shortly after its founding in 2016. The following year, she was a candidate in the legislative elections. Arriving at the top of the first round with 35% of the vote, she won the second with 53% against the socialist candidate Vincent Labarthe.

In March 2018, Huguette Tiegna presented a report that she conducted as part of the work of the Parliamentary Office for the Evaluation of Scientific and Technological Choices (OPECST) on the issues and applications of 3D printing.

During the same month, Tiegna was asked by OPECST to conduct a mission, "Cap 2040" on stopping the sale of vehicles emitting greenhouse gases by 2040.

Tiegna was re-elected as a Member of Parliament in the 2022 legislative elections with 34.14% of the vote, following a particularly close vote. In parliament, Tiegna serves on the Committee on Economic Affairs and the Parliamentary Office for the Evaluation of Scientific and Technological Choices (OPECST). In addition to her committee assignments, she chairs the French Parliamentary Friendship Group with Burkina Faso.

In the 2024 French legislative election, she was unseated by Christophe Proença.

== See also ==
- List of deputies of the 16th National Assembly of France
- List of deputies of the 15th National Assembly of France
