= Jean Launay =

French politician

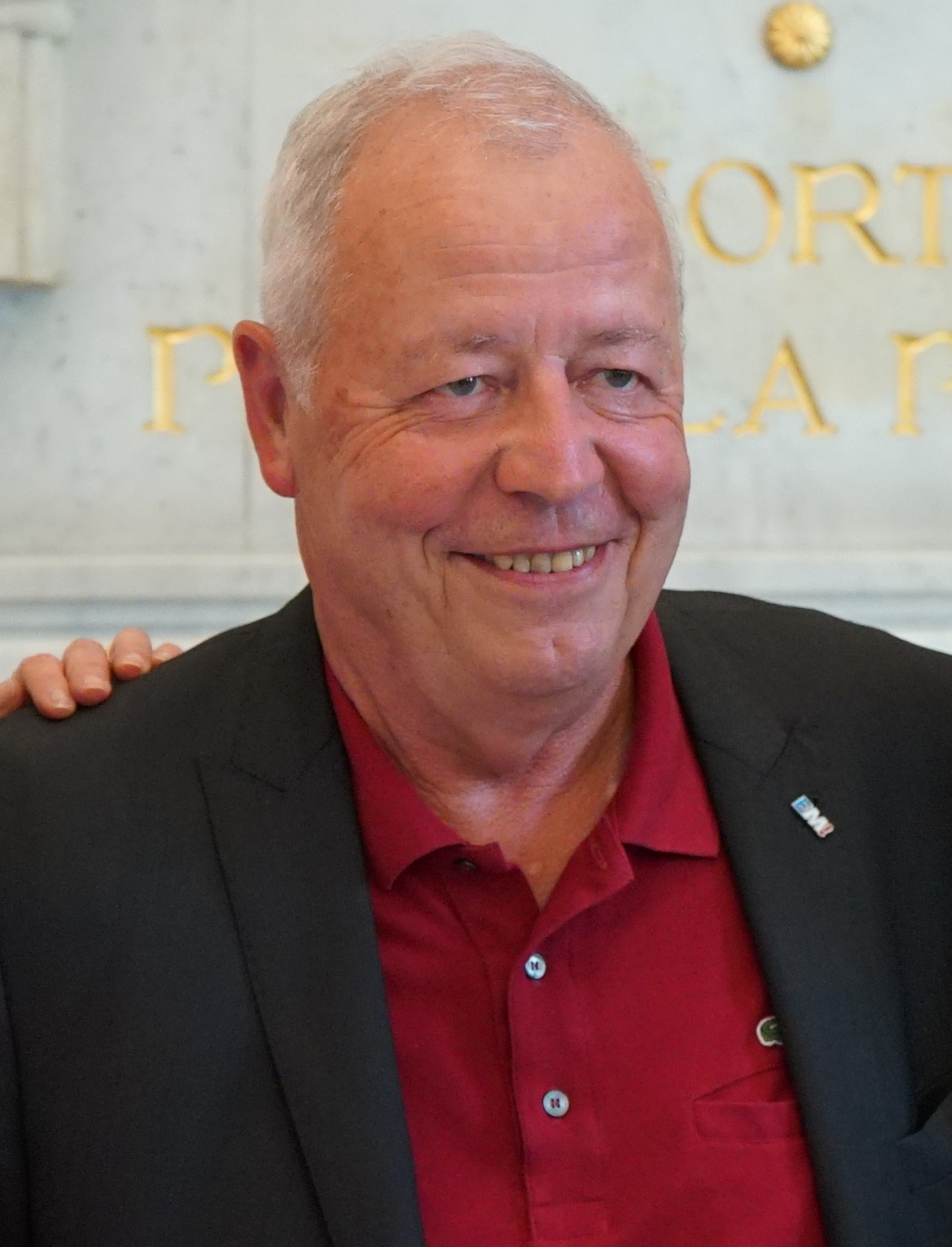
- Jean Launay, at the Palais Bourbon in 2017

Member of the National Assembly for Lot's 2nd constituency
- In office 7 June 1998 – 20 June 2017
- Preceded by: Martin Malvy
- Succeeded by: Huguette Tiegna

Personal details
- Born: 24 July 1952 (age 72)
- Political party: PS

Jean Launay (born 24 July 1952) was a member of the National Assembly of France. He represented Lot's 2nd constituency from 1998 to 2017, as a member of the Socialiste, radical, citoyen et divers gauche.
