= Étienne Pinte =

French politician (born 1939)

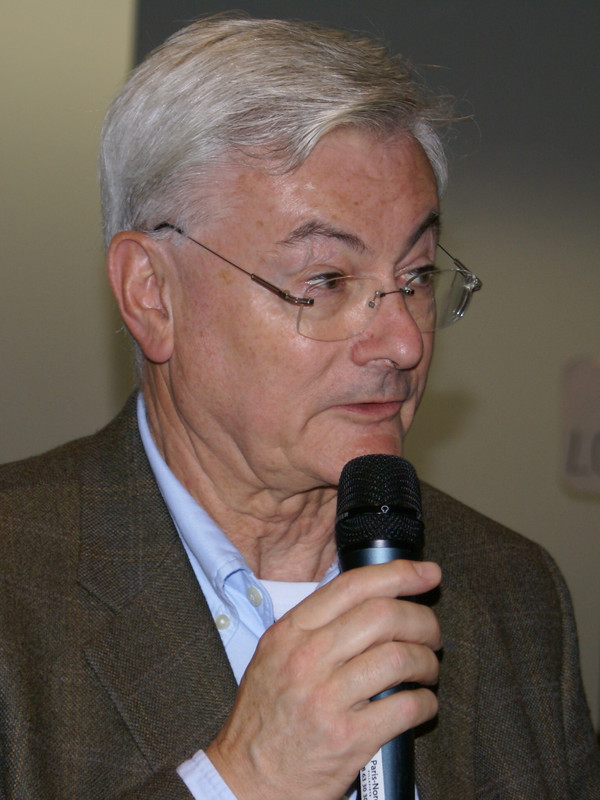

Mayor of Versailles
- In office 1995–2008
- Preceded by: André Damien
- Succeeded by: François de Mazières

Member of the National Assembly for Yvelines's 1st constituency
- In office 1988–2012
- Succeeded by: François de Mazières

Personal details
- Born: 19 March 1939 (age 87) Ixelles, Belgium
- Party: UMP
- Education: Sciences Po

Étienne Pinte (born 19 March 1939) is a French politician. He held the position Député-maire of Versailles, meaning that he was separately elected as both the Mayor of the city and as a Deputy in the National Assembly (Assemblée nationale), but decided not to run again for Mayor in the 2008 election. He represents the Union for a Popular Movement (UMP) party. He is a member of the Cultural Affairs Commission in the National Assembly. He is a law graduate.

== Biography ==
Born in Ixelles, Belgium, he started his political career in 1973 when Alain Peyrefitte named him as substitute Deputy for his constituency in Seine-et-Marne. Peyrefitte, being appointed a minister a few months later, handed over his seat to Pinte. In 1978, he stood for election and won his seat in the first constituency in Yvelines, which comprises part of Versailles, and he has held this ever since, having been re-elected seven times, most recently in 2007.

He was a deputy mayor of Versailles from 1977–1995 during when he was elected mayor. He is married and has four children.

In January 2009, he blamed Britain for the number of illegal immigrants attempting to enter the UK and asked Britain to give asylum to all of them: "Why are the British rejecting them while at the same time they're welcoming thousands of citizens from eastern Europe and in particular from Poland?"
