= André Damien =

French politician, writer, and lawyer (1930–2019)

Mayor of Versailles
- In office 1977–1995
- Preceded by: André Mignot
- Succeeded by: Étienne Pinte

Personal details
- Born: 10 July 1930 Paris, France
- Died: 5 March 2019 (aged 88) Versailles, France
- Education: Sorbonne

Arms of Versailles

André Damien (10 July 1930 – 5 March 2019) was a French lawyer and politician who served as the head of the French Bar Association.

A Supreme Court Justice of France from 1981 until 1997, he also served as Mayor of Versailles as well as being elected a Deputy in the National Assembly.

Damien authored numerous works on legal and historical matters.

Damien died on 5 March 2019 at the age of 88.

== Elected offices ==
- Mayor of Versailles (1977–95)
- Counsellor-General for Yvelines (1979–98)
- Deputy for Yvelines (1996–97).

== Honours ==
- Grand officier, Legion of Honour
- Commandeur, ordre national du Mérite
- Commandeur, ordre des Palmes académiques
- Commandeur, ordre du Mérite agricole
- Commandeur, ordre des Arts et Lettres
- Grand Cross, pro Merito Melitensi.
