= Bruno Sido =

French politician

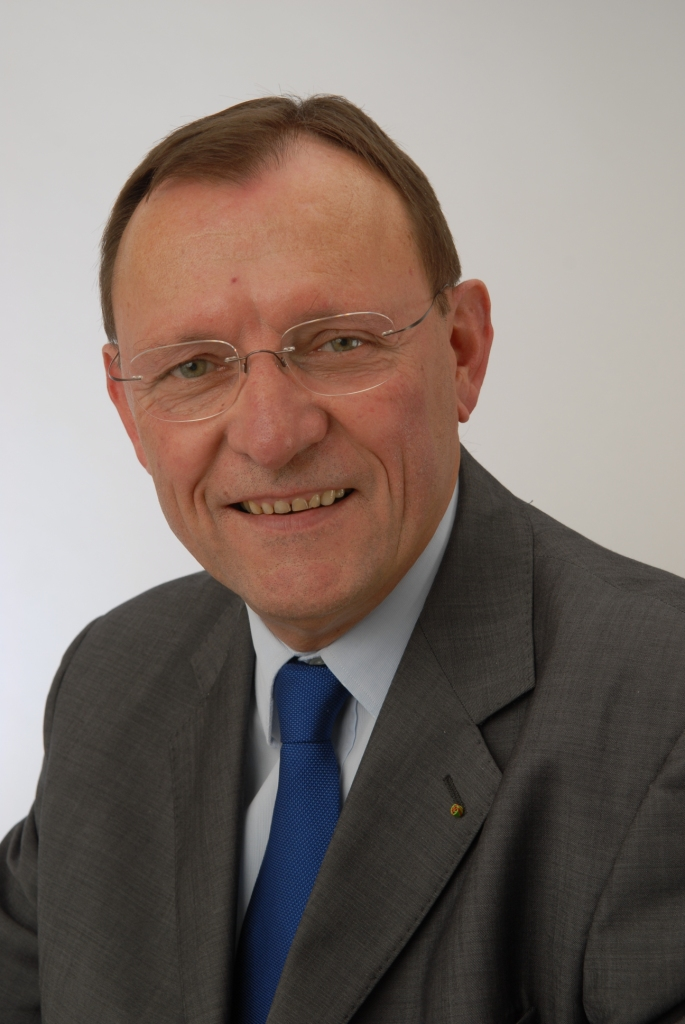
- Bruno Sido in 2012

Member of the French Senate for Haute-Marne
- Incumbent
- Assumed office 1 October 2001
- Preceded by: Antoine Allemeersch

Personal details
- Born: 19 February 1951 (age 75) Paris, France
- Party: The Republicans

Bruno Sido (born 19 February 1951) is a member of the Senate of France, representing the Haute-Marne department. He is a member of The Republicans.

== Political career ==
In parliament, Sido has been a member of the Parliamentary Office for the Evaluation of Scientific and Technological Choices.

Ahead of the 2022 presidential elections, Sido publicly declared his support for Michel Barnier as the Republicans’ candidate.
