= Christophe Proença =

French politician

Member of the National Assembly for Lot's 2nd constituency
- Incumbent
- Assumed office 8 July 2024
- Preceded by: Huguette Tiegna

Personal details
- Born: 31 May 1966 (age 59) Saint-Céré, France
- Party: Socialist

Christophe Proença (born 31 May 1966) is a French politician from the Socialist Party. In the 2024 French legislative election he was elected deputy in July 2024.

== Biography ==
Proença was born in Saint-Céré to a French mother and a father of Portuguese origin who had fled the Salazar dictatorship, Christophe Proença is a teacher of engineering sciences and a voluntary sports educator in football.

Christophe Proença is mayor of the commune of Gintrac and departmental councillor of Lot where he holds the position of vice-president in charge of Attractiveness, Tourism and Sport for this department.

He presented himself as a dissident left candidate against the candidate invested by the New Ecological and Social People's Union during the 2022 French legislative election, contributing to the election of the En Marche candidate Huguette Tiegna.

He is also president of the Cauvaldor community of communes when he stood in the legislative elections of July 2024.

He was elected in the 2024 French legislative election with 46.83% of the vote in the three-way contest between the National Rally candidate Gérard Blanchet and the outgoing MP Huguette Tiegna, who had decided to stay in despite her third place in the first round, against the advice of the Renaissance party.

He resigned from his mandate as President of the Causses and Dordogne Valley Community of Communes following his election and was replaced by Jean-Claude Fouché.

== Mandates ==
- Since 7 July 2024: deputy for the 2nd constituency of Lot

== See also ==
- List of deputies of the 17th National Assembly of France
