= Antoine Herth =

French politician

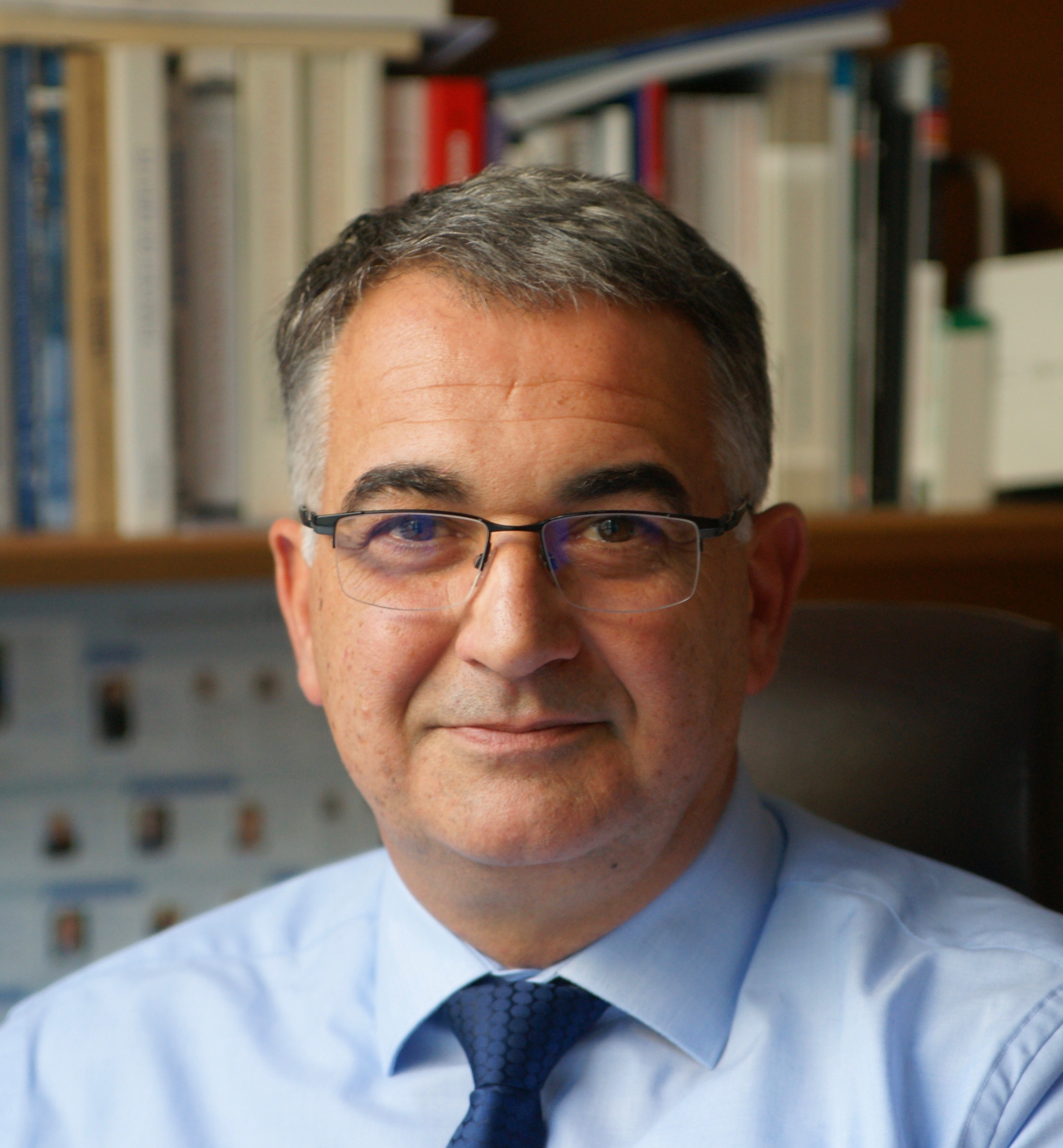
- Herth in 2018

Member of the National Assembly for Bas-Rhin's 5th constituency
- In office 19 June 2002 – 21 June 2022
- Preceded by: Germain Gengenwin
- Succeeded by: Charles Sitzenstuhl

Personal details
- Born: 14 February 1963 (age 63) Sélestat, France
- Party: Union for French Democracy (until 2002); Union for a Popular Movement (2002–2015); The Republicans (2015–2018); Agir (2018–present)

Antoine Herth (born 14 February 1963) is a French politician who represented the 5th constituency of the Bas-Rhin department in the National Assembly from 2002 to 2022. He is a former member of The Republicans, which he left in 2018 to join Agir.

== Political career ==
A farmer by occupation, Herth became secretary-general of the Fédération départementale des syndicats d'exploitants agricoles (FDSEA) of Bas-Rhin in 1998. In 1995, he was elected to the municipal council of Artolsheim, where he served as a deputy mayor from 2001 to 2008. He was also a national secretary of the Union for a Popular Movement from 2005 to 2013, tasked with agriculture.

He held a seat in the Regional Council of Alsace from 2010 to 2015. He held one of the regional council's vice presidencies under the presidency of Philippe Richert.

In Parliament, Herth served as member of the Committee on Economic Affairs from 2002. He was also a member of the Parliamentary Office for the Evaluation of Scientific and Technological Choices (OPECST). He served on the Committee on Sustainable Development and Spatial Planning (2010–2012) and the Committee on Foreign Affairs (2018–2020).

In addition to his committee assignments, Herth chaired the French-Bulgarian Parliamentary Friendship Group. From 2019, he was also a member of the French delegation to the Franco-German Parliamentary Assembly.

From 2020 onwards, he sat in the Agir ensemble group in Parliament. In the 2020 Senate election, he was the top candidate of the presidential majority list in Bas-Rhin, leading a coalition of La République En Marche! (LREM), Agir and the Democratic Movement (MoDem). The list however failed to win a seat.

Herth declined to seek reelection to a fifth term in office in the 2022 legislative election.

== Political positions ==
In The Republicans' 2016 presidential primaries, Herth endorsed fellow MP Bruno Le Maire as the party's candidate for the office of President of France.

In July 2019, Herth voted in favour of the French ratification of the European Union's Comprehensive Economic and Trade Agreement (CETA) with Canada.
