= Emmanuel Mandon =

French politician (born 1965)

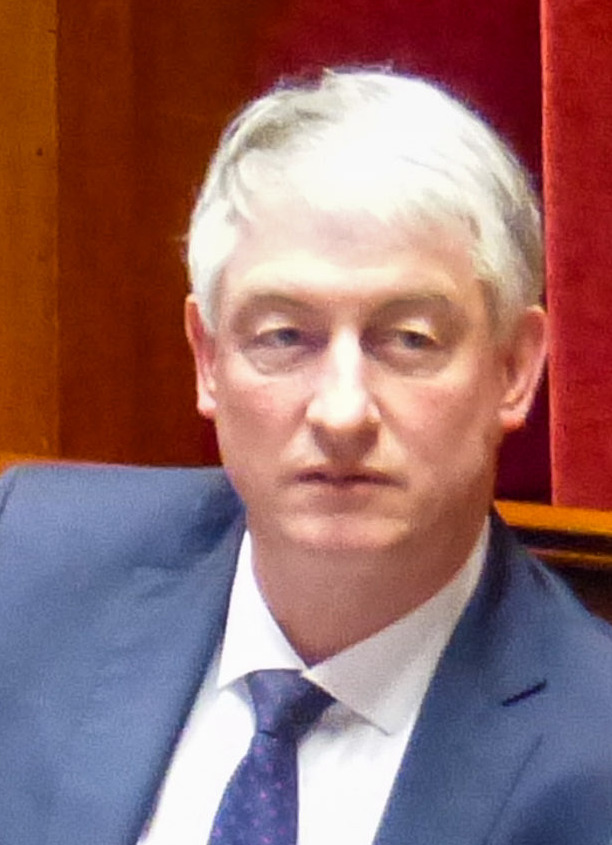
- Emmanuel Mandon in 2025

Member of the National Assembly for Loire's 3rd constituency
- Incumbent
- Assumed office 22 June 2022
- Preceded by: Valéria Faure-Muntian

Personal details
- Born: 22 June 1965 (age 60) Neuilly-sur-Seine, France
- Party: Democratic Movement

Emmanuel Mandon (born 22 June 1965) is a French politician from the Democratic Movement (MoDem). He has been deputy for Loire's 3rd constituency since 2022.

== See also ==
- List of deputies of the 16th National Assembly of France
- List of deputies of the 17th National Assembly of France
