= François de Mazières =

French politician

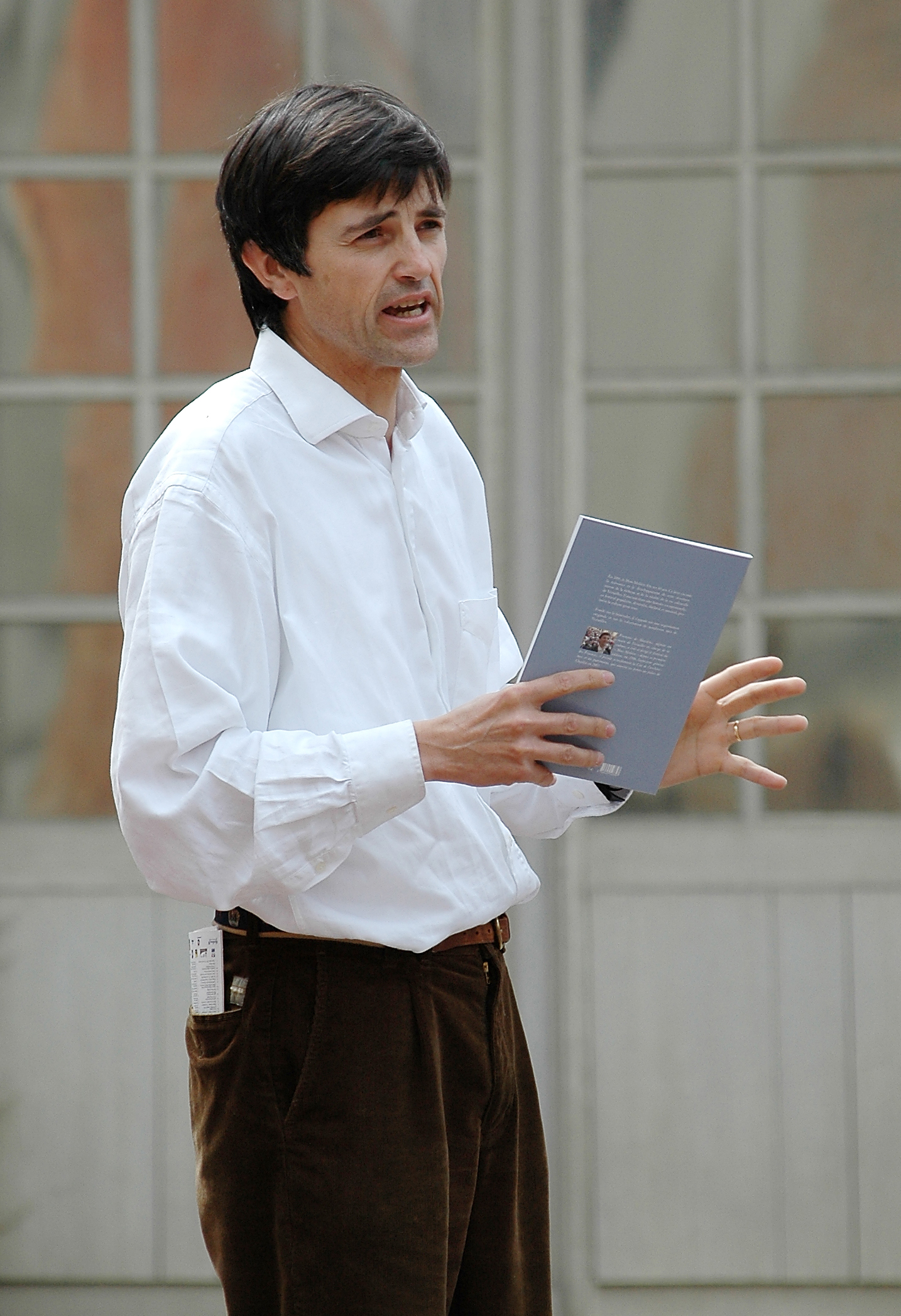

Mayor of Versailles
- Incumbent
- Assumed office 16 March 2008
- Preceded by: Étienne Pinte

Member of the National Assembly for Yvelines's 1st constituency
- In office 2012–2017
- Preceded by: Étienne Pinte
- Succeeded by: Didier Baichère

Personal details
- Born: 22 May 1960 (age 66) Tarbes, France
- Party: Miscellaneous right
- Education: Sciences Po; Panthéon-Assas University; ÉNA

François de Mazières (French pronunciation: [fʁɑ̃swa də mazjɛʁ]; born 22 May 1960) is a French politician. He was a member of the National Assembly, representing Yvelines from June 2012 to June 2017. He has been Mayor of Versailles since March 2008.

== Biography ==
=== Youth and schooling ===
He is the son of Philippe de Mazières (1931–2013), sub-prefect of Argenteuil, Aix-en-Provence and Mulhouse, then prefect of Haute-Marne, and of Anne-Claude Perrin, an Africanist scholar. François de Mazières completed his secondary education in Versailles, at the Collège Saint-Jean-de-Béthune and then at the Lycée Hoche. At the age of thirteen, he was admitted to the drama class of Marcelle Tassencourt at the Versailles conservatory, which he attended until he enrolled at the Paris Institute of Political Studies (Sciences Po).

A graduate of Sciences Po Paris in 1982, he also obtained a master's degree in law from the University of Paris II that same year. He completed his military service in 1984.

From 1985 to 1987, he was a student at the École Nationale d'Administration (ENA), in the Fernand Braudel graduating class.
