= Lot's 2nd constituency =

Constituency of the National Assembly of France

1st constituency of Lot
- inline Constituency of the National Assembly of France

- The constituencies of Lot

- Lot in France
- Deputy: Christophe Proença; PS
- Department: Lot
- Cantons: Bretenoux, Cajarc, Figeac-Est, Figeac-Ouest, Gramat, Lacapelle-Marival, Latronquière, Limogne-en-Quercy, Livernon, Martel, Saint-Céré, Souillac, Sousceyrac, Vayrac
- Registered voters: 86,288

The 2nd constituency of Lot is a French legislative constituency in the Lot département.

== Description ==
- From 2 April 1992 to 2 October 1992, Martin Malvy was State Secretary for Relations with Parliament and Government spokesman, and, from 2 October 1992 to 29 March 1993, He was Budget Ministers in the Bérégovoy Government. He was replaced by his substitute, Marie-Claude Malaval.

== Deputies ==
Election	Member	Party
1988	Martin Malvy	PS
1992	Marie-Claude Malaval	PS
1993	Martin Malvy	PS
1997	Martin Malvy	PS
1998	Jean Launay	PS
2002	Jean Launay	PS
2007	Jean Launay	PS
2012	Jean Launay	PS
2017	Huguette Tiegna	LREM
2022	Huguette Tiegna	RE
2024	Christophe Proença	PS

== Election results ==
=== 2024 ===
Candidate	Party	Alliance	First round		Second round	
Candidate	Party	Alliance	Votes	%	Votes	%
Christophe Proença	PS	NPF	18,079	38.22	22,374	46.83
Gérard Raymond Blanchet	RN		14,369	30.38	15,531	32.51
Huguette Tiegna	REN	Ensemble	12,752	26.96	9,870	20.66
Daniel Paget	Ind		1,237	2.62		
Marie-Michèle Viau	LO		607	1.28		
Rabah Bouguerra	DVG		259	0.55		
Valid votes			47,303	95.96	47,775	96.11
Blank votes			1,114	2.26	1,242	2.59
Null votes			880	1.79	692	1.39
Turnout			49,297	74.33	49,709	74.95
Abstentions			17,023	25.67	16,612	25.05
Registered voters			66,320		66,321	
Result			PS GAIN OVER RE			

=== 2022 ===
Legislative Election 2022: Lot's 2nd constituency
Party	Candidate	Votes	%	±%
LFI (NUPÉS)	Thierry Grossemy	9,116	23.73	-16.85
LREM (Ensemble)	Huguette Tiegna	9,103	23.70	-11.72
PS	Christophe Proença*	8,896	23.16	N/A
RN	Armelle Le Gloannec	4,735	12.33	+3.86
LR (UDC)	Louis Bontemps	3,119	8.12	−5.17
REC	Stanislas Salauze	1,224	3.19	N/A
Others	N/A	2,220	5.78	
Turnout		38,413	59.35	+0.58
2nd round result
LREM (Ensemble)	Huguette Tiegna	12,744	34.14	-19.11
LFI (NUPÉS)	Thierry Grossemy	12,618	33.80	−14.69
PS	Christophe Proença*	11,966	32.06	N/A
Turnout		37,329	59.26	+6.57
LREM hold				

* PS dissident

=== 2017 ===
Candidate	Label	First round		Second round	
Candidate	Label	Votes	%	Votes	%
Huguette Tiegna	REM	13,206	35.42	15,985	53.25
Vincent Labarthe	PS	7,116	19.09	14,033	46.75
Pierre Dufour	FI	5,758	15.45		
Antoine Loredo	UDI	3,630	9.74		
Virginie Castagnol	FN	3,156	8.47		
Florence Rouch	ECO	1,360	3.65		
Roland Hureaux	LR	1,325	3.55		
Christian Ribeyrotte	PCF	892	2.39		
Marie-Rose Bonneval	DIV	342	0.92		
Nathalie Moquet	DIV	291	0.78		
Jean-Marc Isnard	EXG	204	0.55		
Votes		37,280	100.00	30,018	100.00
Valid votes		37,280	97.05	30,018	87.18
Blank votes		707	1.84	2,851	8.28
Null votes		427	1.11	1,563	4.54
Turnout		38,414	58.77	34,432	52.69
Abstentions		26,949	41.23	30,913	47.31
Registered voters		65,363		65,345	
Source: Ministry of the Interior

=== 2012 ===
Jean Launay was reelected in the first round.

Legislative Election 2012: Lot 2nd - 1st round
Party	Candidate	Votes	%	±%
PS	Jean Launay	21,824	52.76	
PRV	Ellen Dausse	8,449	20.42	
FN	Julia Plane	4,084	9.87	
FG	Bernadette Baloche	3,264	7.89	
EELV	Florence Gaudefroy-Demombynes	1,564	3.78	
MoDem	Jean-Claude Tassain	1,484	3.59	
AEI	Cyrille Garcia	333	0.81	
NPA	Gérard Barde	223	0.54	
LO	Jean-Marc Isnard	141	0.34	
Turnout		42,485	65.38	
PS hold		Swing		

== Sources ==
- "Résultats électoraux officiels en France" (in French). 2012.
- "Résultats électoraux officiels en France" (in French). 2017.
