= Bas-Rhin's 5th constituency =

Constituency of the National Assembly of France

5th constituency of Bas-Rhin
- inline Constituency of the National Assembly of France

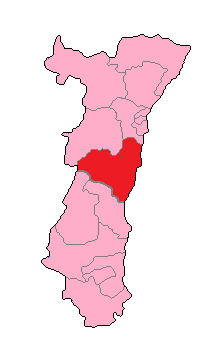
- Bas-Rhin's 5th Constituency shown within Alsace

- Bas-Rhin in France
- Deputy: Charles Sitzenstuhl; Agir
- Department: Bas-Rhin
- Cantons: Barr, Benfeld, Erstein, Marckolsheim, Obernai, Sélestat
- Registered voters: 98,427

The 5th constituency of the Bas-Rhin is a French legislative constituency in the Bas-Rhin département.

== Description ==
The 5th Constituency of Bas-Rhin covers the southern portion of the Département including nearly the entire of the Arrondissement of Sélestat-Erstein excluding only Obernai.

The seat has traditionally been a stronghold of the right since its inception and was held by the Gaullist UMP/LR from 2002 to 2022, when the seat was gained by the moderate right Agir party, as part of Emmanuel Macron's centrist Ensemble Citoyens alliance.

== Historic representation ==
Election	Member	Party
1958	Albert Ehm	UNR
1962	Albert Ehm	UNR
1967	Albert Ehm	UDR
1968	Albert Ehm	UDR
1973	Albert Ehm	UDR
1978	Georges Klein	UDF
1980	Germain Gengenwin	UDF
1981	Germain Gengenwin	UDF
1986	Proportional representation – no election by constituency	
1988	Germain Gengenwin	UDF
1993	Germain Gengenwin	UDF
1997	Germain Gengenwin	UDF
2002	Antoine Herth	UMP
2007	Antoine Herth	UMP
2012	Antoine Herth	UMP
2017	Antoine Herth	LR
2022	Charles Sitzenstuhl	Agir

== Election results ==
=== 2024 ===
Legislative Election 2024: Bas-Rhin's 5th constituency
Party	Candidate	Votes	%	±%
DLF	Bastien Macia	767	1.08	N/A
DVE	Christian Dantz	803	1.13	−1.68
LR	Léo Coutaud	3,529	4.96	N/A
LO	Patrick Dutter	446	0.63	N/A
PS (NFP)	Marc Ruhlmann	12,043	16.92	N/A
RN	Thomas Estève	27,897	39.20	+18.11
RE (Ensemble)	Charles Sitzenstuhl	22,993	32.31	−0.31
UL	Sarah Weiss Moessmer	2,681	3.77	−4.67
Turnout		71,159	97.97	+52.22
Registered electors		107,594		
2nd round result
RE	Charles Sitzenstuhl	39 124	55,18	+22,87
RN	Thomas Estève	31,778	44.82	+5.49
Turnout		70,902	96.05	+53.67
Registered electors		107,602		
RE hold		Swing		

=== 2022 ===
Legislative Election 2022: Bas-Rhin's 5th constituency
Party	Candidate	Votes	%	±%
Agir (Ensemble)	Charles Sitzenstuhl	15,550	32.62	N/A
RN	Marc Wolff	10,052	21.09	+5.18
LFI (NUPÉS)	Véronique Toulza	7,653	16.05	−2.28
UDI (UDC)	Olivier Sohler	4,553	9.55	−28.04
UL (REG)	Sarah Weiss Moessmer	4,021	8.44	−8.41
DVE	Daniel Weber	1,341	2.81	+0.60
DVD	Angelo Errera-Muller	1,028	2.16	N/A
REC	Mélanie Abassi	1,007	2.11	N/A
Others	N/A	2,465	-	−
Turnout		47,670	45.75	+0.95
2nd round result
Agir (Ensemble)	Charles Sitzenstuhl	25,426	60.67	N/A
RN	Marc Wolff	16,484	39.33	N/A
Turnout		41,910	42.38	+4.54
Agir gain from LR				

=== 2017 ===
Results of the 11 June and 18 June 2017 French National Assembly election in Bas-Rhin’s 5th Constituency
Candidate	Party		1st round		2nd round	
Candidate	Party		Votes	%	Votes	%
Antoine Herth	The Republicans	LR	16,842	37.59	19,508	54.14
Gérard Simler	Regionalist	REG	7,547	16.85	16,522	45.86
Eliane Klein	National Front	FN	7,126	15.91		
Caroline Reys	Ecologist	ECO	4,059	9.06		
Janig Terrier	La France Insoumise	FI	3,739	8.35		
Christian Dantz	Ecologist	ECO	1,482	3.31		
Daniel Weber	Ecologist	ECO	990	2.21		
Christine Beccari	Debout la France	DLF	975	2.18		
Christine Romanus	Communist Party	PCF	414	0.92		
Patrick Dutter	Far Left	EXG	414	0.92		
Candice Vetroff	Independent	DIV	371	0.83		
Eric Gautier	Far Right	EXD	308	0.69		
Eric Lapp-Lauth	Independent	DIV	283	0.63		
Feridun Ulusoy	Independent	DIV	252	0.56		
Total			44,802	100%	36,030	100%
Registered voters			103,986		103,986	
Blank/Void ballots			1,779	3.82%	3,318	8.43%
Turnout			46,581	44.80%	39,348	37.84%
Abstentions			57,405	55.20%	64,638	62.16%
Result					LR GAIN FROM UMP	

=== 2012 ===
Results of the 10 June and 17 June 2012 French National Assembly election in Bas-Rhin’s 5th Constituency
Candidate	Party		1st round		2nd round	
Candidate	Party		Votes	%	Votes	%
Antoine Herth	Union for a Presidential Majority	UMP	26,404	49.31	32,063	67.78
Daniel Ehret	Europe Ecology - The Greens	EELV	11,888	22.20	15,244	32.22
Christian Cotelle	National Front	FN	10,306	19.25		
Michel Gilardeau	The Centre for France	CEN	1,399	2.61		
Ariane Henry	Left Front	FG	1,362	2.54		
Daniel Webber	Ecologist	ECO	1,080	2.02		
Patrick Dutter	Far Left	EXG	556	1.04		
Christophe Palisser	Other	AUT	547	1.02		
Emmanuel Wingender	Other	AUT	0	0.00		
Total			53,542	100%	47,307	100%
Registered voters			98,427		98,427	
Blank/Void ballots			977	1.79%	1,652	3.37%
Turnout			54,519	55.39%	48,959	49.74%
Abstentions			43,908	44.61%	49,468	50.26%
Result					UMP HOLD	

=== 2007 ===
Antoine Herth was elected with more than 50% of the vote in the first round of voting, and therefore no second round took place.

Results of the 10 June and 17 June 2007 French National Assembly election in Bas-Rhin’s 5th Constituency
Candidate	Party		1st round	
Candidate	Party		Votes	%
Antoine Herth	Union for a Popular Movement	UMP	31,277	58.01
Danièle Meyer	UDF-Democratic Movement	UDF-MoDem	6,812	12.63
Christiane Hamman	Socialist Party	PS	5,566	10.32
Christian Cotelle	National Front	FN	3,606	6.69
Michèle Gartner	The Greens	LV	1,885	3.50
Clément Renaudet	Ecologist	ECO	1,258	2.33
Monique Funck	Miscellaneous Right	DVD	742	1.38
Patrick Dutter	Far Left	EXG	715	1.33
Marie-Claude Richez	Far Left	EXG	680	1.26
Auguste Bildstein	Independent	DIV	452	0.84
Edmond Guillet	Far Right	EXD	374	0.69
Jean-Louis Kubiack	Communist Party	PCF	339	0.63
Gabrielle Domin	Miscellaneous Left	DVG	213	0.40
Total			53,919	100%
Registered voters			99,091	
Blank/Void ballots			1,434	2.59%
Turnout			55,353	55.86%
Abstentions			43,738	44.14%
Result			UMP HOLD	

=== 2002 ===
Results of the 9 June and 16 June 2002 French National Assembly election in Bas-Rhin’s 5th Constituency
Candidate	Party		1st round		2nd round	
Candidate	Party		Votes	%	Votes	%
Antoine Herth	Union for a Presidential Majority	UMP	14,242	26.82	22,592	56.93
Alfred Becker	Miscellaneous Right	DVD	12,895	24.28	17,086	43.07
Christian Cotelle	National Front	FN	7,335	13.81		
Christiane Hamman	Socialist Party	PS	7,215	13.59		
Gerard Simler	Miscellaneous Right	DVD	4,726	8.90		
Michele Gartner	The Greens	LV	1,556	2.93		
Christian Dantz	Ecologist	ECO	846	1.59		
Christian Hager	National Republican Movement	MNR	799	1.50		
Patrick Dutter	Workers’ Struggle	LO	788	1.48		
Laure Kretz	Republican Pole	PR	544	1.02		
Christian Jaeg	Miscellaneous Right	DVD	420	0.79		
Michel Schulz	Movement for France	MPF	408	0.77		
Francois Waag	Regionalist	REG	355	0.67		
Andre Hemmerle	Communist Party	PCF	343	0.65		
Remi Freixinos	Independent	DIV	259	0.49		
Cyrille Hurstel	Independent	DIV	209	0.39		
Christian Pierrat	Ecologist	ECO	164	0.31		
Total			53,104	100%	39,668	100%
Registered voters			92,990		92,984	
Blank/Void ballots			1,591	2.91%	4,315	9.81%
Turnout			54,695	58.82%	43,983	47.30%
Abstentions			38,295	41.18%	49,001	52.70%
Result					UMP GAIN FROM UDF	
