= Didier Baichère =

French politician

Member of the National Assembly for Yvelines's 1st constituency
- In office 21 June 2017 – 21 June 2022
- Preceded by: François de Mazières
- Succeeded by: Charles Rodwell

Personal details
- Born: 20 August 1970 (age 56) Limoux, France
- Party: Renaissance
- Education: Paris Descartes University

Didier Baichère (born 20 August 1970) is a French politician who has been serving as a member of the National Assembly since 18 June 2017, representing the department of Yvelines. He is a member of Renaissance (RE).

== Early career ==
From 1997 to 2012, Baichère held various positions at Alcatel-Lucent, in particular as Human Resources Director at Alcatel Submarine Networks from 2000 to 2007 and at Alcatel Lucent France from 2008 to 2012. From 2012 to 2014, he worked for CGI Inc., again in the HR sector, this time in charge of France, Luxembourg and Morocco. After a stint at Naval Group where he was Vice President in charge of Group Human Resources, he joined AKKA Technologies in 2015.

== Political career ==
In parliament, Baichère serves on the Defense Committee and the Parliamentary Office for the Evaluation of Scientific and Technological Choices (OPECST). In addition to his committee assignments, he is a member of the French delegation to the Inter-Parliamentary Union (IPU).

In late 2019, Baichère was one of 17 members of the Defense Committee who co-signed a letter to Prime Minister Édouard Philippe in which they warned that the 365 million euro ($406 million) sale of aerospace firm Groupe Latécoère to U.S. fund Searchlight Capital raised “questions about the preservation of know-how and France’s defense industry base” and urged government intervention. Also in 2019, he co-sponsored legislation to create a framework for wide-ranging tests of facial recognition software for government services.

In 2020, Baichère joined En commun (EC), a group within LREM led by Barbara Pompili.

== Political positions ==
In July 2019, Baichère voted in favor of the French ratification of the European Union’s Comprehensive Economic and Trade Agreement (CETA) with Canada.

== See also ==
- 2017 French legislative election
