= Yvelines's 1st constituency =

Constituency of the National Assembly of France

1st constituency of Yvelines
- inline Constituency of the National Assembly of France

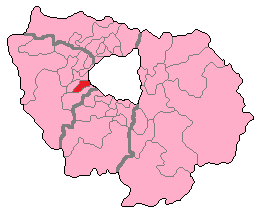
- Yvelines' 1st Constituency shown within Île-de-France
- Deputy: Charles Rodwell; Agir
- Department: Yvelines
- Cantons: Montigny-le-Bretonneux, Versailles-Nord, Versailles Nord-Ouest, Versailles-Sud (part)
- Registered voters: 83,490

The 1st constituency of Yvelines is a French legislative constituency in the Yvelines département.

== Description ==
The 1st constituency of Yvelines includes most of the historic royal city of Versailles.

Politically the seat has been a stronghold of the right since its creation in 1968. In its entire history it has only been represented by four men. Its first deputy Bernard Destremau was a noted tennis player and diplomat.

== Historic representation ==
| Election | Member | Party |
|---|---|---|
| 1962 | Bernard Destremau | RI |
| 1967 | Bernard Destremau | RI |
| 1968 | Bernard Destremau | RI |
| 1973 | Bernard Destremau | RI |
| 1974 | Jean Riquin | RPR |
| 1976 | Bernard Destremau | RI |
| 1978 | Étienne Pinte | RPR |
| 1981 | Étienne Pinte | RPR |
| 1986 | Proportional representation – no election by constituency | |
| 1988 | Étienne Pinte | RPR |
| 1993 | Étienne Pinte | RPR |
| 1997 | Étienne Pinte | RPR |
| 2002 | Étienne Pinte | UMP |
| 2007 | Étienne Pinte | UMP |
| 2012 | François de Mazières | UMP |
| 2017 | Didier Baichère | LREM |
| 2022 | Charles Rodwell | Agir |

== Election results ==
=== 2024 ===
| Candidate | Party | Alliance | First round | | | Second round | | |
| Candidate | Party | Alliance | Votes | % | +/– | Votes | % | +/– |
|---|---|---|---|---|---|---|---|---|
| Charles Rodwell | RE | ENS | 20,235 | 33.55 | +0.47 | 27,403 | 46.90 | -16.41 |
| Sébastien Ramage | LFI | NFP | 17,073 | 28.31 | +3.82 | 16,828 | 28.80 | -7.89 |
| Anne Jacqmin | RN | | 11,686 | 19.37 | +12.12 | 14,195 | 24.30 | N/A |
| Arnaud Poulain | LR | | 9,783 | 16.22 | +0.35 | | | |
| Sabine Clement | REC | | 868 | 1.44 | -11.03 | | | |
| Jean-Loup Leroux | LO | | 523 | 0.87 | +0.24 | | | |
| Guillaume Carlier | DVC | | 147 | 0.24 | N/A | | | |
| Valid votes | | | 60,315 | 98.41 | -0.06 | 58,426 | 97.71 | |
| Blank votes | | | 744 | 1.21 | +0.03 | 1,092 | 1.83 | +0.62 |
| Null votes | | | 231 | 0.38 | +0.03 | 278 | 0.46 | -0.08 |
| Turnout | | | 61,290 | 72.78 | +16.79 | 59,796 | 71.00 | -1.78 |
| Abstentions | | | 22,918 | 27.22 | -16.79 | 24,418 | 29.00 | +1.78 |
| Registered voters | | | 84,208 | | | 84,214 | | |
Source: Ministry of the Interior, Le Monde
| Result | | | | | | REN HOLD | | |

=== 2022 ===
Legislative Election 2022: Yvelines's 1st constituency
| Party | Candidate | Votes | % | ±% |
|---|---|---|---|---|
| Agir (Ensemble) | Charles Rodwell | 15,198 | 33.08 | -9.07 |
| LFI (NUPÉS) | Sébastien Ramage | 11,253 | 24.49 | +7.69 |
| LR (UDC) | Olivier De La Faire | 7,292 | 15.87 | −11.62 |
| REC | Laurence Trochu | 5,730 | 12.47 | N/A |
| RN | Anne Jacqmin | 3,332 | 7.25 | +2.18 |
| LC (UDC) | Iphigénie Kameni | 1,213 | 2.64 | N/A |
| Others | N/A | 1,930 | 4.20 | |
| Turnout | | 45,948 | 55.99 | +0.21 |
2nd round result
| Agir (Ensemble) | Charles Rodwell | 25,707 | 63.31 | +12.25 |
| LFI (NUPÉS) | Sébastien Ramage | 14,898 | 36.69 | N/A |
| Turnout | | 40,605 | 52.66 | +6.03 |
| Agir gain from LREM | | | | |

=== 2017 ===
Legislative Election 2017: Yvelines's 1st constituency
| Party | Candidate | Votes | % | ±% |
|---|---|---|---|---|
| LREM | Didier Baichère | 19,630 | 42.15 | |
| LR | François-Xavier Bellamy | 12,801 | 27.49 | |
| LFI | Thibaut Marchal | 3,744 | 8.04 | |
| FN | Thierry Perez | 2,360 | 5.07 | |
| PS | Charlotte Rossettini | 2,163 | 4.64 | |
| EELV | Olivier Pareja | 1,918 | 4.12 | |
| DVD | François Billot De Lochner | 1,295 | 2.78 | |
| Others | N/A | 2,661 | | |
| Turnout | | 46,572 | 55.78 | |
2nd round result
| LREM | Didier Baichère | 19,879 | 51.06 | |
| LR | François-Xavier Bellamy | 19,054 | 48.94 | |
| Turnout | | 38,933 | 46.63 | |
| LREM gain from LR | | | | |

=== 2012 ===
Legislative Election 2012: Yvelines's 1st constituency
| Party | Candidate | Votes | % | ±% |
|---|---|---|---|---|
| UMP | François de Mazières | 19,227 | 39.08 | |
| PS | Isabelle This Saint-Jean | 15,655 | 31.82 | |
| FN | Dominique Touly | 3,904 | 7.94 | |
| DVD | Béatrice Bourges | 3,508 | 7.13 | |
| EELV | Jean-Luc Manceau | 1,851 | 3.76 | |
| FG | Emilie Germain-Vedrenne | 1,684 | 3.42 | |
| MoDem | Jean-Marc Coursin | 1,558 | 3.17 | |
| Others | N/A | 1,810 | | |
| Turnout | | 49,640 | 60.77 | |
2nd round result
| UMP | François de Mazières | 26,544 | 56.75 | |
| PS | Isabelle This Saint-Jean | 20,230 | 43.25 | |
| Turnout | | 47,683 | 58.38 | |
| UMP hold | | | | |

=== 2007 ===
Legislative Election 2007: Yvelines's 1st constituency
| Party | Candidate | Votes | % | ±% |
|---|---|---|---|---|
| UMP | Étienne Pinte | 26,751 | 46.62 | |
| PS | Sylvie Faucheux | 12,667 | 22.08 | |
| MoDem | Valérie Ohannessian | 6,950 | 12.11 | |
| LV | Jean-Luc Manceau | 2,619 | 4.56 | |
| MPF | Jacques Roze | 2,592 | 4.52 | |
| FN | Michel Bayvet | 2,241 | 3.91 | |
| Others | N/A | 3,555 | | |
| Turnout | | 58,209 | 63.60 | |
2nd round result
| UMP | Étienne Pinte | 28,300 | 57.70 | |
| PS | Sylvie Faucheux | 20,750 | 42.30 | |
| Turnout | | 51,205 | 55.95 | |
| UMP hold | | | | |

=== 2002 ===
Legislative Election 2002: Yvelines's 1st constituency
| Party | Candidate | Votes | % | ±% |
|---|---|---|---|---|
| UMP | Étienne Pinte | 25,287 | 43.85 | |
| PS | Maryvonne Coulloch-Katz | 13,856 | 24.03 | |
| FN | Michel Bayvet | 4,681 | 8.12 | |
| DVD | Béatrice Bourges Boyer Chammard | 4,532 | 7.86 | |
| LV | Michel Bock | 2,456 | 4.26 | |
| MPF | Maud de Lesquen | 2,125 | 3.69 | |
| DIV | Alain Perusat | 1,328 | 2.30 | |
| Others | N/A | 3,400 | | |
| Turnout | | 58,287 | 69.78 | |
2nd round result
| UMP | Étienne Pinte | 32,133 | 63.96 | |
| PS | Maryvonne Coulloch-Katz | 18,108 | 36.04 | |
| Turnout | | 52,105 | 62.38 | |
| UMP hold | | | | |

=== 1997 ===
Legislative Election 1997: Yvelines's 1st constituency
| Party | Candidate | Votes | % | ±% |
|---|---|---|---|---|
| RPR | Étienne Pinte | 21,833 | 40.62 | |
| PS | Anne-Marie Doux | 12,033 | 22.38 | |
| FN | Jean-Philippe Lemaire | 6,241 | 11.61 | |
| DVD | Maud de Lesquen | 2,898 | 5.39 | |
| PCF | Joëlle Leroy | 2,531 | 4.71 | |
| DIV | Julie Calemard | 2,349 | 4.37 | |
| LV | Djamal Yalaoui | 2,134 | 3.97 | |
| GE | Jean-Pierre Blanchelande | 1,467 | 2.73 | |
| Far left | Michel Bock | 1,077 | 2.00 | |
| Others | N/A | 1,192 | | |
| Turnout | | 55,489 | 66.71 | |
2nd round result
| RPR | Étienne Pinte | 33,645 | 61.42 | |
| PS | Anne-Marie Doux | 21,133 | 38.58 | |
| Turnout | | 57,410 | 69.02 | |
| RPR hold | | | | |

== Sources ==
Official results of French elections from 2002: "Résultats électoraux officiels en France" (in French).
