= Loire's 3rd constituency =

Constituency of the National Assembly of France

3rd constituency of Loire
- inline Constituency of the National Assembly of France

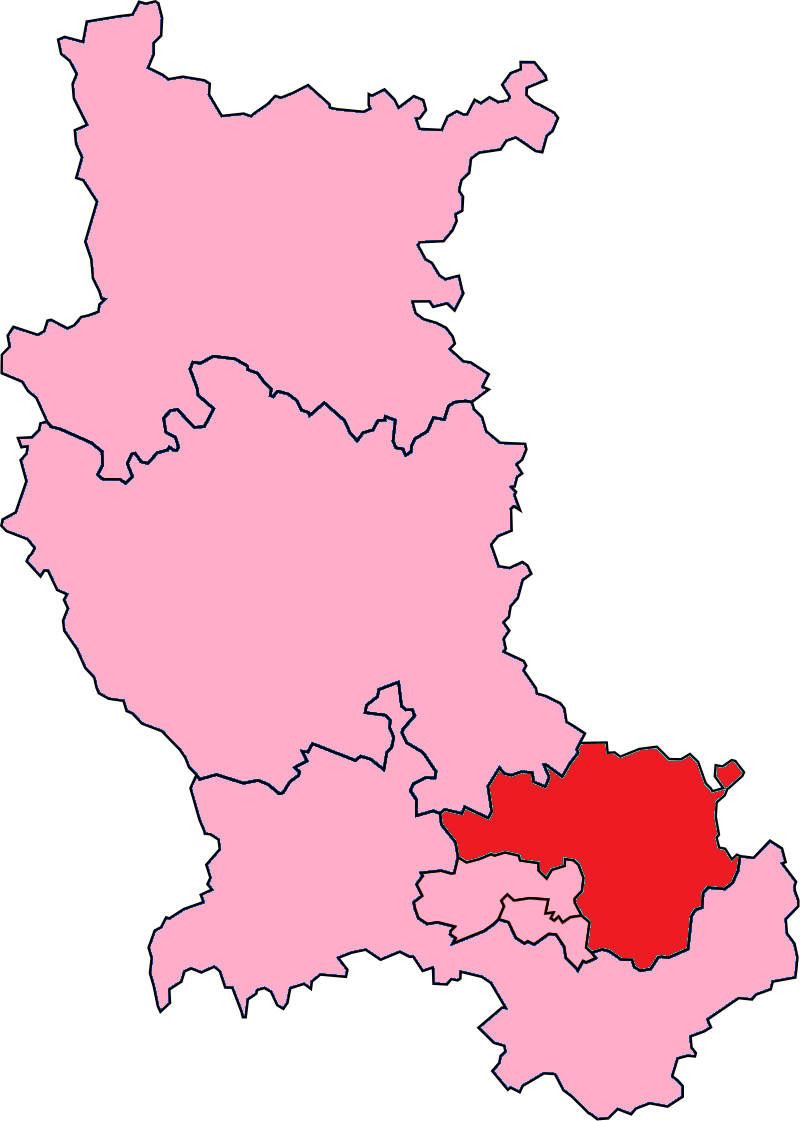
- Loire's's 3rd Constituency shown within Loire
- Deputy: Emmanuel Mandon; MoDem
- Department: Loire
- Cantons: La Grand-Croix, Rive-de-Gier, Saint-Chamond Nord, Saint-Chamond Sud, Saint-Héand
- Registered voters: 82496

The 3rd constituency of the Loire (French: Troisième circonscription de la Loire) is a French legislative constituency in the Loire département. Like the other 576 French constituencies, it elects one MP using a two round electoral system.

== Description ==
The 3rd constituency of the Loire lies to the east of Saint-Etienne in the south of the department. The largest town in the constituency Saint-Chamond sits on the main road between Saint-Etienne and Lyon.

Between its creation in its modern form in 1988 and 2017 the seat was represented by François Rochebloine of the centre right. He finally lost his seat to En Marche! in the landslide election of that year.

== Assembly Members ==
Election	Member	Party
1988	François Rochebloine	UDF
2007	François Rochebloine	NC
2012	François Rochebloine	UDI
2017	Valéria Faure-Muntian	LREM
2022	Emmanuel Mandon	MoDem
2024	Emmanuel Mandon	MoDem

== Election results ==
=== 2024 ===
Candidate	Party	Alliance	First round			Second round		
Candidate	Party	Alliance	Votes	%	+/–	Votes	%	+/–
Angelina La Marca	RN		22,813	40.89	+19.81	24,604	44.54	new
Emmanuel Mandon	MoDEM	Ensemble	16,243	29.11	+3.41	30,634	55.46	-1.86
Vincent Bony	PCF	NFP	15,254	27.34	+3.68	withdrew		
Rachid Daoud	DVG		754	1.35	new			
Pauline Husseini	LO		727	1.30	+0.43			
Votes			55,791	100.00		55,238	100.00	
Valid votes			55,791	97.30	-0.54	55,238	95.71	+3.92
Blank votes			1,310	2.28	+0.40	2,086	3.61	-3.16
Null votes			240	0.42	+0.14	388	0.67	-0.77
Turnout			57,341	67.94	+22.13	57,712	68.36	+25.56
Abstentions			27,063	32.06	-22.13	26,716	31.64	-25.56
Registered voters			84,404			84,428		
Result			MoDEM HOLD					

=== 2022 ===
Legislative Election 2022: Loire's 3rd constituency
Party	Candidate	Votes	%	±%
MoDem (Ensemble)	Emmanuel Mandon	9,621	25.70	-7.49
PCF (NUPÉS)	Vincent Bony	8,858	23.66	+1.58
RN	Angelina La Marca	7,890	21.08	+4.82
LR (UDC)	Axel Dugua	5,060	13.52	−8.59
REC	Isabelle Surply	2,067	5.52	N/A
DVC	Éric Le Jaouen*	800	2.14	N/A
Others	N/A	3,141	-	−
Turnout		37,437	45.81	−0.26
2nd round result
MoDem (Ensemble)	Emmanuel Mandon	18,807	57.32	+4.70
PCF (NUPÉS)	Vincent Bony	14,006	42.68	N/A
Turnout		32,813	42.80	+3.54
MoDem gain from LREM				

* Le Jaouen ran as a LREM dissident. LREM's alliance, Ensemble Citoyens, supported Mandon.

=== 2017 ===
Candidate	Label	First round		Second round	
Candidate	Label	Votes	%	Votes	%
Valéria Faure-Muntian	REM	12,250	33.19	15,298	52.62
François Rochebloine	UDI	8,161	22.11	13,776	47.38
Isabelle Surply	FN	6,370	17.26		
Louis Caillon	FI	3,566	9.66		
Philippe Kizirian	PS	2,657	7.20		
Patricia Simonin-Chaillot	ECO	1,299	3.52		
Nicole Forest	DVD	823	2.23		
Céline Veau	PCF	626	1.70		
André Duport	ECO	327	0.89		
André Moulin	EXG	321	0.87		
Christian Meunier	EXD	297	0.80		
Mireille Clerc	DIV	215	0.58		
Votes		36,912	100.00	29,074	100.00
Valid votes		36,912	98.22	29,074	89.77
Blank votes		537	1.43	2,637	8.14
Null votes		131	0.35	676	2.09
Turnout		37,580	45.55	32,387	39.26
Abstentions		44,915	54.45	50,109	60.74
Registered voters		82,495		82,496	
Source: Ministry of the Interior

=== 2012 ===
2012 legislative election in Loire's 3rd constituency
Candidate	Party	First round		Second round	
Candidate	Party	Votes	%	Votes	%
Philippe Kizirian	PS–EELV	14,809	31.98%	20,406	47.64%
François Rochebloine	NC	11,442	24.71%	22,428	52.36%
Séverine Brun	FN	9,658	20.86%		
Hervé Reynaud	DVD	5,165	11.15%		
Vincent Bony	FG	2,898	6.26%		
Alain Barbasso	EELV dissident	1,180	2.55%		
Nicole Lancon	MEI	454	0.98%		
Julien Vassal	DLR	315	0.68%		
André Moulin	LO	246	0.53%		
Alexis Pereira		138	0.30%		
Valid votes		46,305	98.81%	42,834	96.17%
Spoilt and null votes		558	1.19%	1,706	3.83%
Votes cast / turnout		46,863	58.26%	44,540	55.36%
Abstentions		33,581	41.74%	35,913	44.64%
Registered voters		80,444	100.00%	80,453	100.00%

=== 2007 ===
Legislative Election 2007: Loire's 3rd constituency
Party	Candidate	Votes	%	±%
NM	François Rochebloine	22,056	49.96	
PS	Christiane Farigoule	10,575	23.96	
MoDem	Simonne Hube	3,150	7.14	
FN	Christian Meunier	2,609	5.91	
PCF	Ginette Moulin	1,472	3.33	
LV	Catherine Bony	1,375	3.11	
EXG	Jean-Marc Seguillon	1,033	2.34	
Others	N/A	1,874		
Turnout		44,824	56.65	
2nd round result
NM	François Rochebloine	25,189	59.03	
PS	Christiane Farigoule	17,485	40.97	
Turnout		43,877	55.46	
NM gain from UDF				

=== 2002 ===
Legislative Election 2002: Loire's 3rd constituency
Party	Candidate	Votes	%	±%
UDF	François Rochebloine	22,765	47.92	
PS	Christiane Farigoule	11,447	24.10	
FN	Christian Grangis	7,816	16.45	
PCF	Vincent Bony	1,677	3.53	
LV	Françoise Bour-James	949	2.00	
Others	N/A	2,849		
Turnout		48,188	64.19	
2nd round result
UDF	François Rochebloine	25,608	63.07	
PS	Christiane Farigoule	14,993	36.93	
Turnout		42,046	56.01	
UDF hold				

=== 1997 ===
Legislative Election 1997: Loire's 3rd constituency
Party	Candidate	Votes	%	±%
FD (UDF)	François Rochebloine	15,629	32.88	
FN	Christian Grangis	11,611	24.43	
PS	Marie-Christine Laurent	9,325	19.62	
PCF	André Géry	4,365	9.18	
LV	Gérard Payre	2,946	6.20	
LO	André Moulin	1,266	2.66	
LDI	Alexandre Riberon	1,251	2.63	
MEI	Frédéric Gioia	780	1.64	
EXG	Bernard Marcuccilli	362	0.76	
Turnout		49,675	69.14	
2nd round result
FD (UDF)	François Rochebloine	23,928	46.10	
PS	Marie-Christine Laurent	18,610	35.86	
FN	Christian Grangis	9,363	18.04	
Turnout		53,453	74.40	
FD hold				
