= François Rochebloine =

French politician

François Rochebloine (born 31 October 1945 in Saint-Chamond, Loire) is a former member of the National Assembly of France. He represented Loire's 3rd constituency, and is a member of the New Centre. The Azerbaijani government has blacklisted Rochebloine who visited Nagorno-Karabakh in June 2010 without Baku’s permission.

== Biography ==
A former sales manager for a Saint-Chamond SME, he became involved in local life in Saint-Chamond during the 1977 municipal elections, when he was a candidate on the list of Mr. Gidrol, first deputy to Antoine Pinay, who was not standing for re-election. This list was defeated, and he had to wait until the 1983 municipal elections to sit on the Saint-Chamond town council, in opposition, with his colleagues on the UDF-RPR union list. A member of the CDS, he became deputy of the Loire region (3rd constituency) on June 12, 1988, in the second round of legislative elections, defeating the deputy-mayor of Saint-Chamond, Jacques Badet. He was constantly re-elected until 2012. He has always been a member of the center-right parliamentary groups at the French National Assembly: UDC, UDF, Nouveau Centre and UDI. He represented the National Assembly for 15 years at the Parliamentary Assembly of the Council of Europe (from July 20, 2002 to June 18, 2017).
