= Kiembara Department =

Coordinates: 13°15′N 2°44′W

Kiembara
- Department
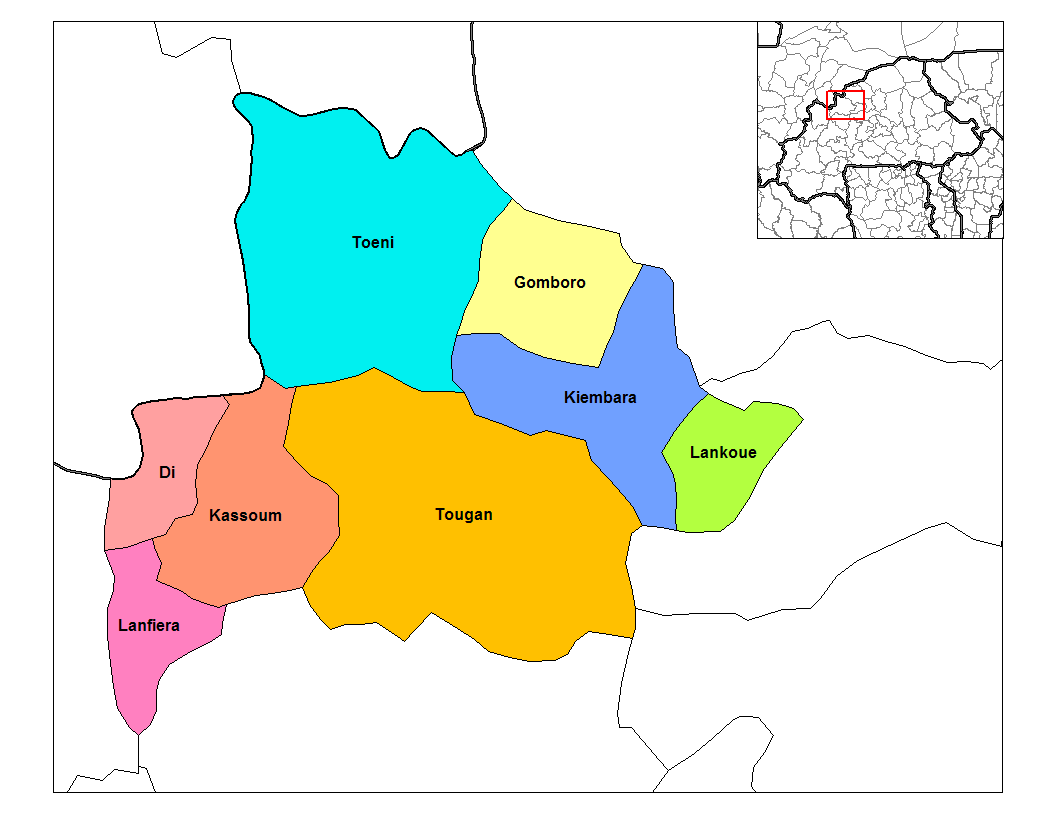
- Kiembara Department location in the province
- Country: Burkina Faso
- Province: Sourou Province

Area
  - Total: 286.0 sq mi (740.8 km^{2})

Population (2019 census)
  - Total: 39,289
  - Density: 137.4/sq mi (53.04/km^{2})
- Time zone: UTC+0 (GMT 0)

Kiembara is a department or commune of Sourou Province in north-western Burkina Faso. Its capital lies at the town of Kiembara
