= Recollects Convent (Versailles) =

Convent in Yvelines, France

Coordinates: 48°48′09″N 2°07′21″E

Recollects Convent at Versailles
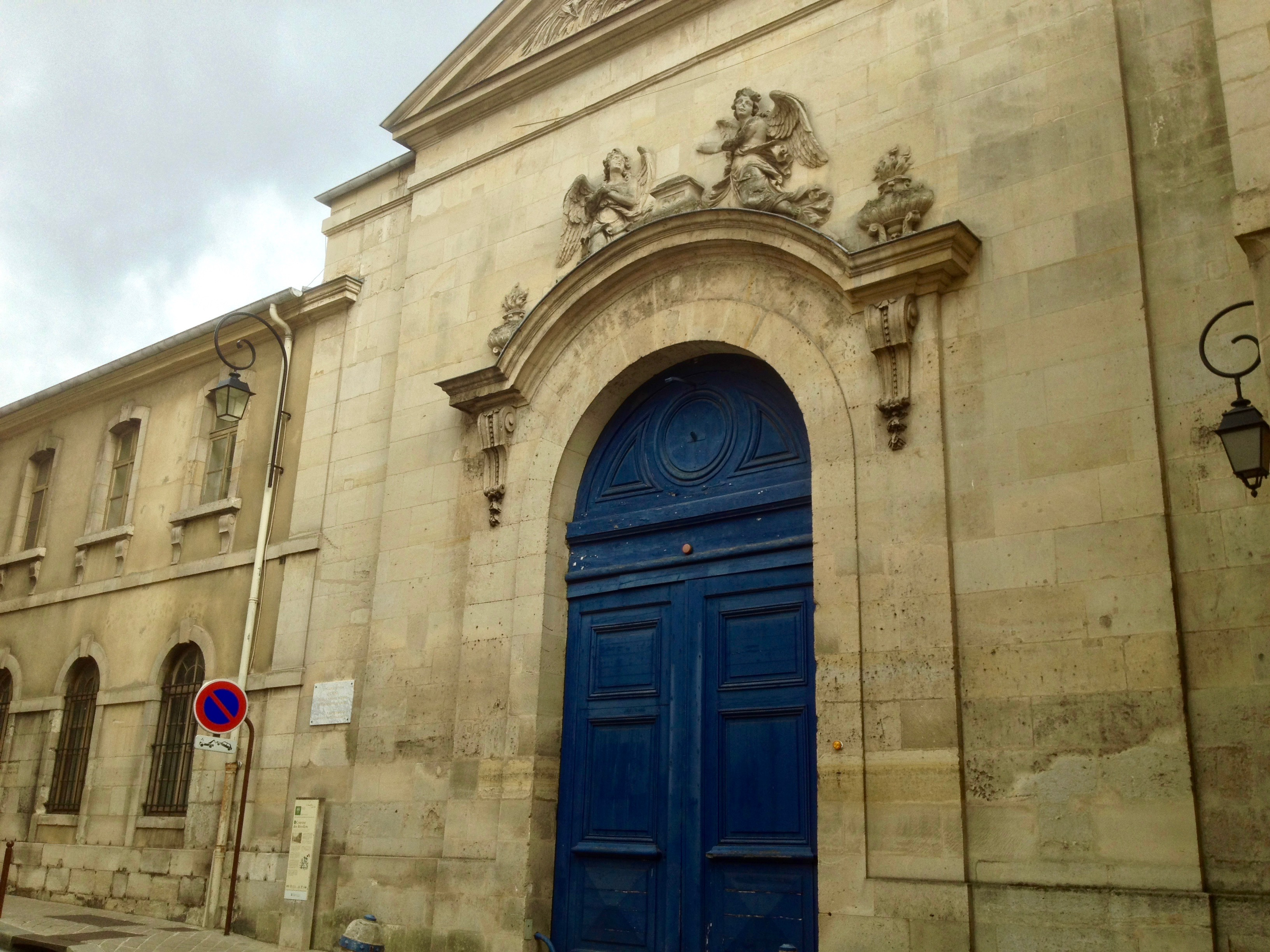

General information
- Architectural style: French Baroque Architecture
- Location: Versailles, 9, rue des Récollets, France
- Construction started: 1684
- Renovated: 1985

Design and construction
- Architect: Jules Hardouin-Mansart

The Recollects Convent was built originally in 1684 at the Palace of Versailles, France by order of Louis XIV as a house for the religious order of Recollects - a reform branch of the Franciscans created in 16th century in France, Germany, and Holland. After the order was suppressed during the French Revolution, the building was converted into a prison, and then later in the 19th century was used by the French army.

Currently occupied by the French Ministry of Defense, the convent is only open to visitors during certain public events, such as Le Mois Molière (an annual theater event organized by the city of Versailles).

== History ==
During the period 1672-1673, as part of the design for his new Court of France, at what was then a royal hunting lodge at Versailles, Louis XIV decided to demolish Saint-Julien, the only church in Versailles at that time, and construct a convent for the Recollects, (an order so favored by the king he chose army chaplains from them) in the new town to be situated on the opposite side of the Palace, in today’s Notre-Dame area.

In 1682, the Court of Louis XIV was installed at Versailles, and Jules Hardouin-Mansart, chief architect to the king, constructed the Grand Commun, an annex designed to house court administrators on the old Saint-Julien Church site.

In 1684, he began the construction of Notre-Dame Cathedral. For the parishioners of the old town, he built the Recollects Convent just behind the Grand Commun. Three bells from the convent have been preserved at the Lambinet Museum in Versailles; the date 1684 can be seen on one of them.

During the assembly of the Estates General in 1789, after the oath at the Royal Tennis court, the Third Estate deputies, who had been trying to combine votes with the clergy, asked the monks of the Recollect for asylum, but were refused. They later reconfirmed their oath at the Saint-Louis church.

During the French Revolution, the order of the Recollects was abolished, and in 1793 the convent was transformed into a prison.

In 1796, the basilica, which had been about to collapse, was finally demolished except for the facade, with plans (that were never carried out) to construct a crossing between rue St Julien and rue du Jeu de Paume.

Since the 19th century, it has been reserved for military use; in 1914, the 5th regiment of engineers left there for World War I.

In 1985, the front portal of the basilica was repaired, keeping the original sculptures.

In 2001, the area behind the building became a public park "le Jardin des Récollets" (Recollects park) inaugurated by Etienne Pinte, deputy-mayor of Versailles. In 2013, the park was redesigned by Nicola Gilsoul, architect and landscape architect, for the project of the city "la Cour des Senteurs". Since then, it has also been called "Jardin des Senteurs" (Scent Park).

== Construction ==
- The convent is built in a rectangular shape.
- A cloister is on the south side and partially surrounds the French formal garden.
- A basilica with a nave was on the north side of the formal garden until it was demolished in 1796. The site is now paved and conserved as a part of the courtyard.
- The north part of the convent marks the limits of la Cour des Senteurs created in 2013.
- The front portal of the basilica on the rue des Récollets (Recollects street) received parishioners until the Revolution. A pediment is over the door.
- The west part of the convent, with windows onto the rue des Récollets, continues to be the side entrance of la Cour des Senteurs.
- A small service entrance is situated on the south side of the wall.
- The ground behind the east part of the convent was opened as a public park in 2001.
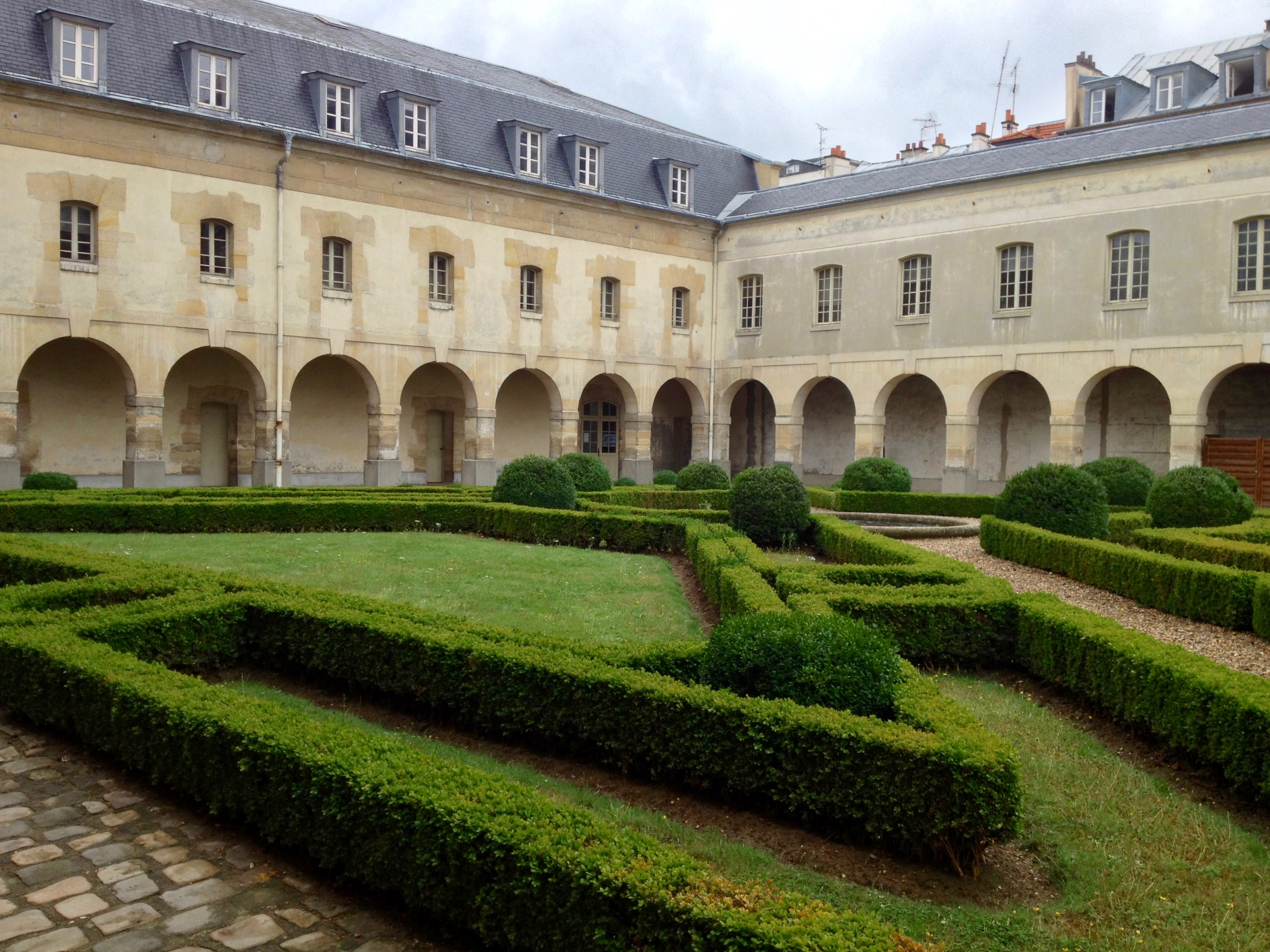
Cloister surrounding the formal garden of Recollects convent, Versailles

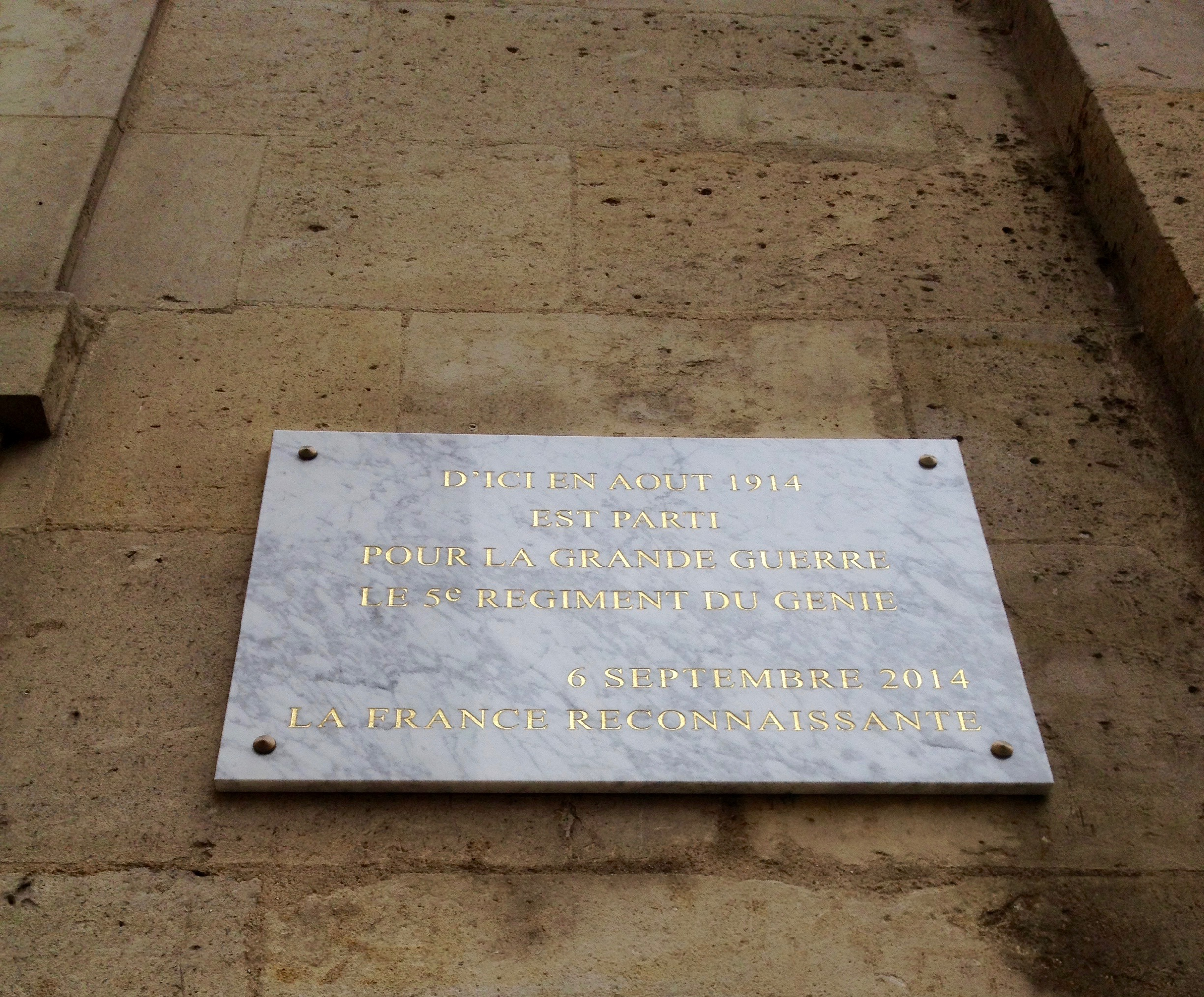
Plaque commemorating the 5th regiment of engineers

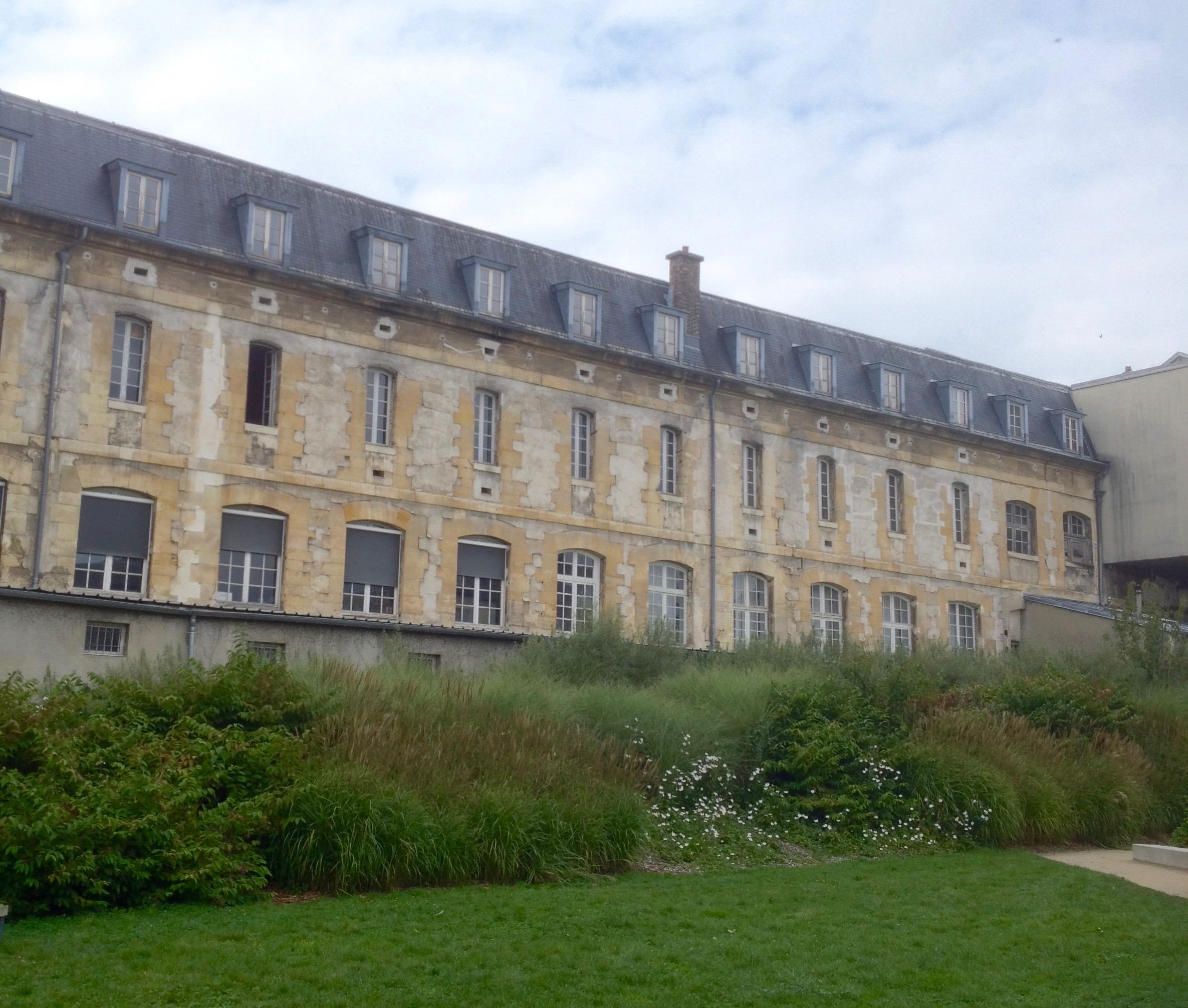
Jardin des Récollets, 2016

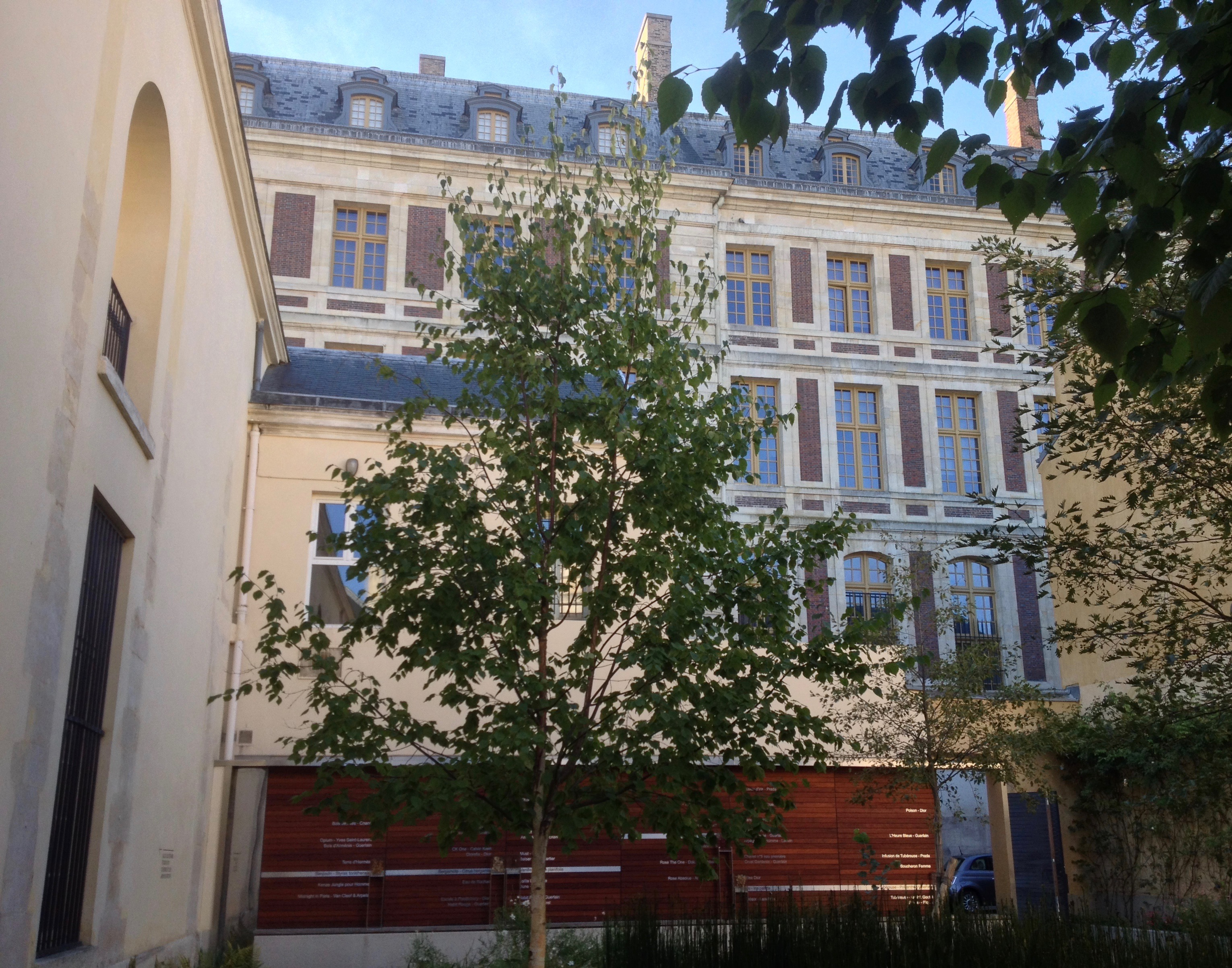
The Grand Commun as viewed from la Cour des Senteurs beside the east building of Recollects Convent

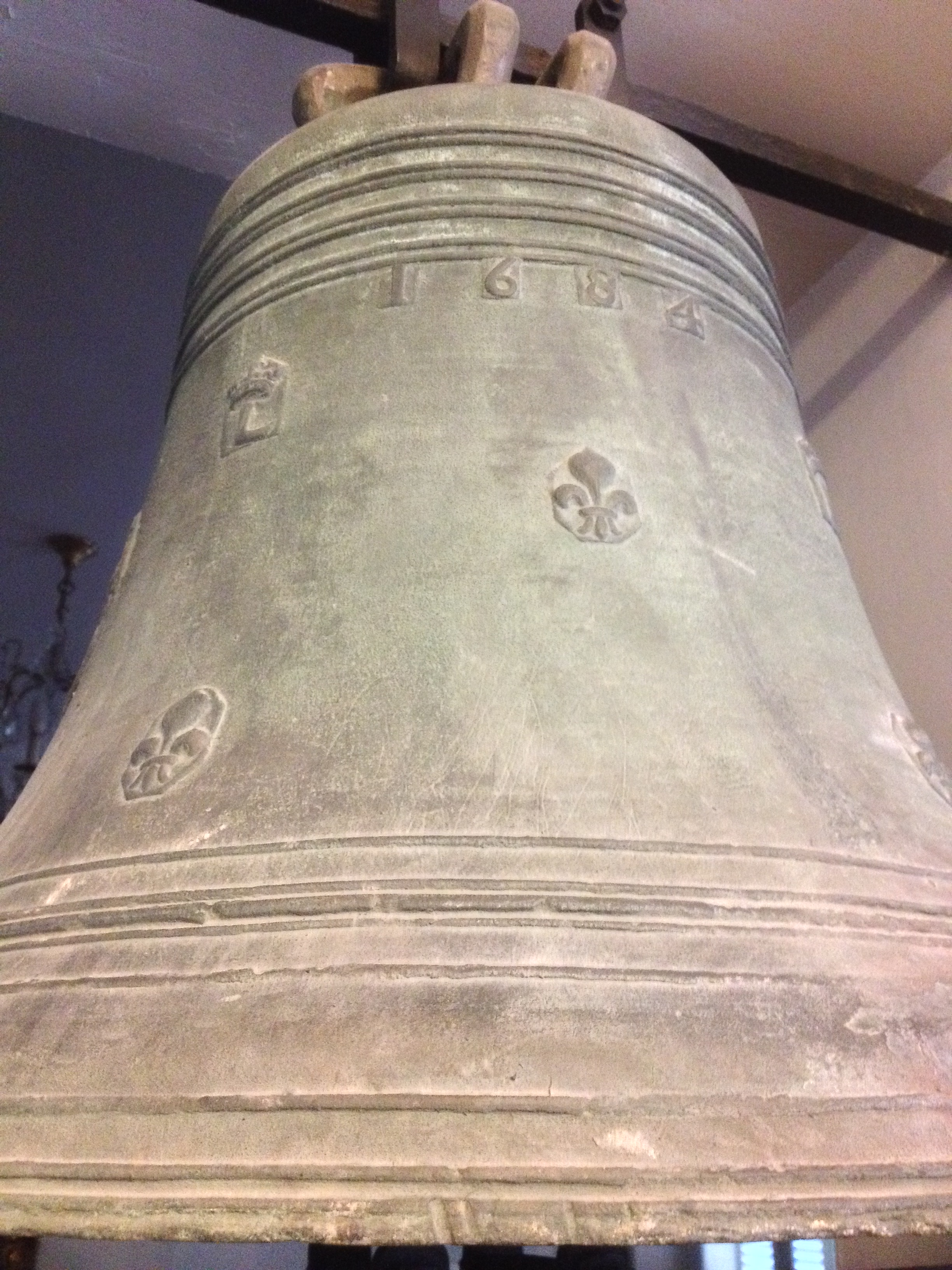
One of the three bells at Lambinet Museum. The date of "1684" can be seen
