= Cour des Senteurs =

Perfume tourist attraction in Versailles, France

Coordinates: 48°48′10″N 2°07′24″E

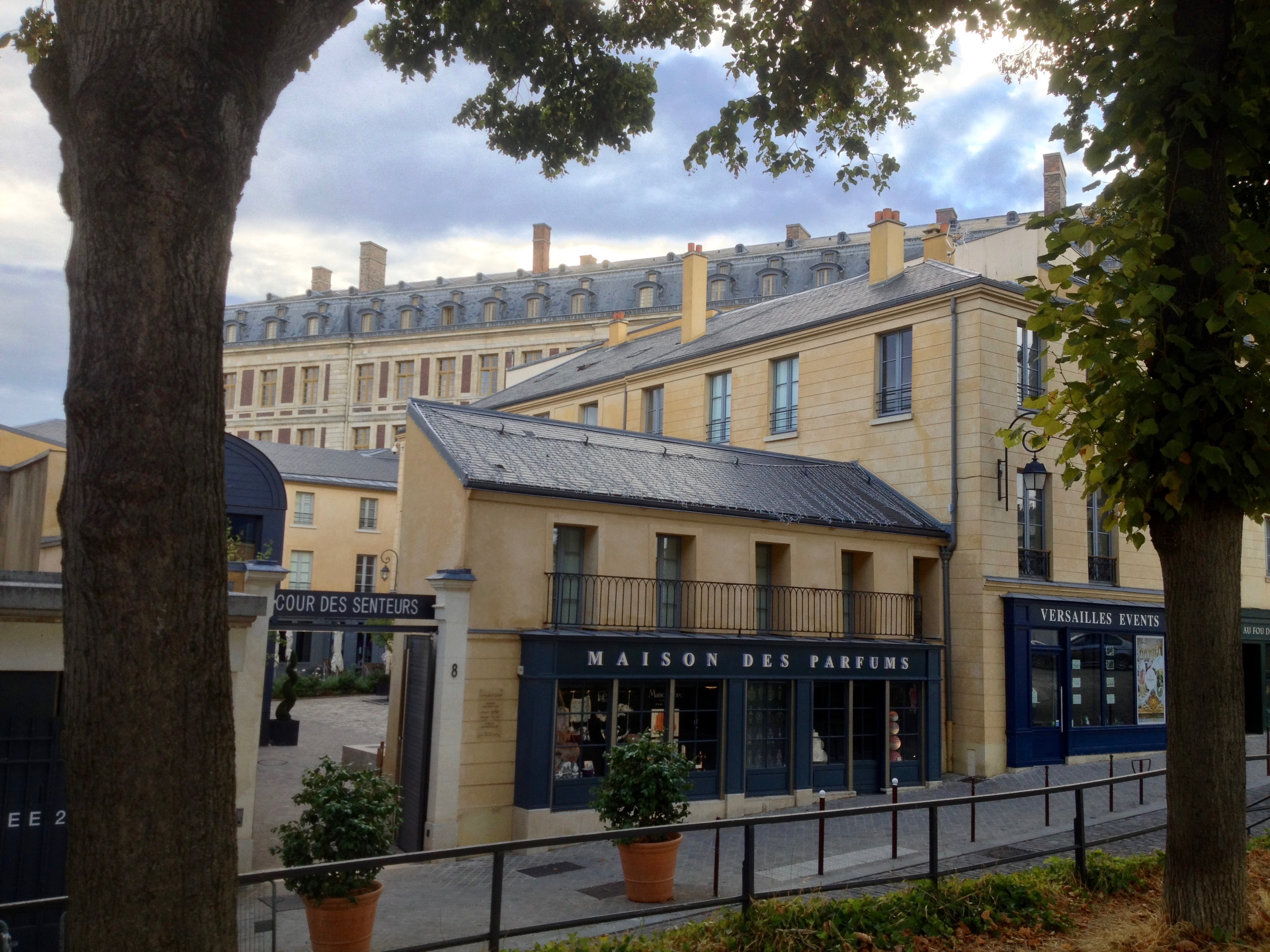
- entrance of la Cour des Senteurs

General information
- Status: renovated
- Architectural style: residence of 17-19th century with courtyard
- Location: 8 rue de la Chancellerie, Versailles, France
- Current tenants: shops in the court
- Inaugurated: Spring 2013
- Renovated: 2012-2013

Design and construction
- Architects: Philippe Pumain, Nicolas Gilsoul

La Cour des Senteurs (The Scent Courtyard) is a newly opened area in Versailles, France, dedicated to the culture of perfume, which is one of the important cultures in France.

It was opened in 2013 after the renovation of a former historical area near the Palace of Versailles.

It is composed by several shops and restaurants in a courtyard, and two gardens.

== Location ==
100m from the Palace of Versailles at 8, rue de la Chancellerie, Versailles, France.

It can be accessed from either la rue des Récollets, beside the former Recollects Convent, or la rue de Fontenay from le Jardin des Récollets.

== Structure of la Cour des Senteurs ==
The group of buildings in this area are leaning against the former Recollects Convent.

Cour des Senteurs (courtyard)

Behind the entrance, several prestigious brands and restaurants receive visitors in the courtyard.

Small green square

There is a small green square which explains the histories of the famous perfumes on display with some samples of raw materials. This area can be visited directly from the side entrance at la rue des Récollets.

Jardin des Récollets, « Jardin des Senteurs »

This park, accessible from the square, was once a part of the domain of the Recollects convent, found behind of la Cour des Senteurs. It was opened in 2001 as a public park by Etienne Pinte, Deputy-Mayor of Versailles. Later on, for the project of la Cour des Senteurs, the city asked Nicolas Gilsoul, architect/landscape architect, to create a new design this garden. It is consequently called "Jardin des Senteurs".

La Cour des Senteurs represents a meeting of culture, history and nature combined.

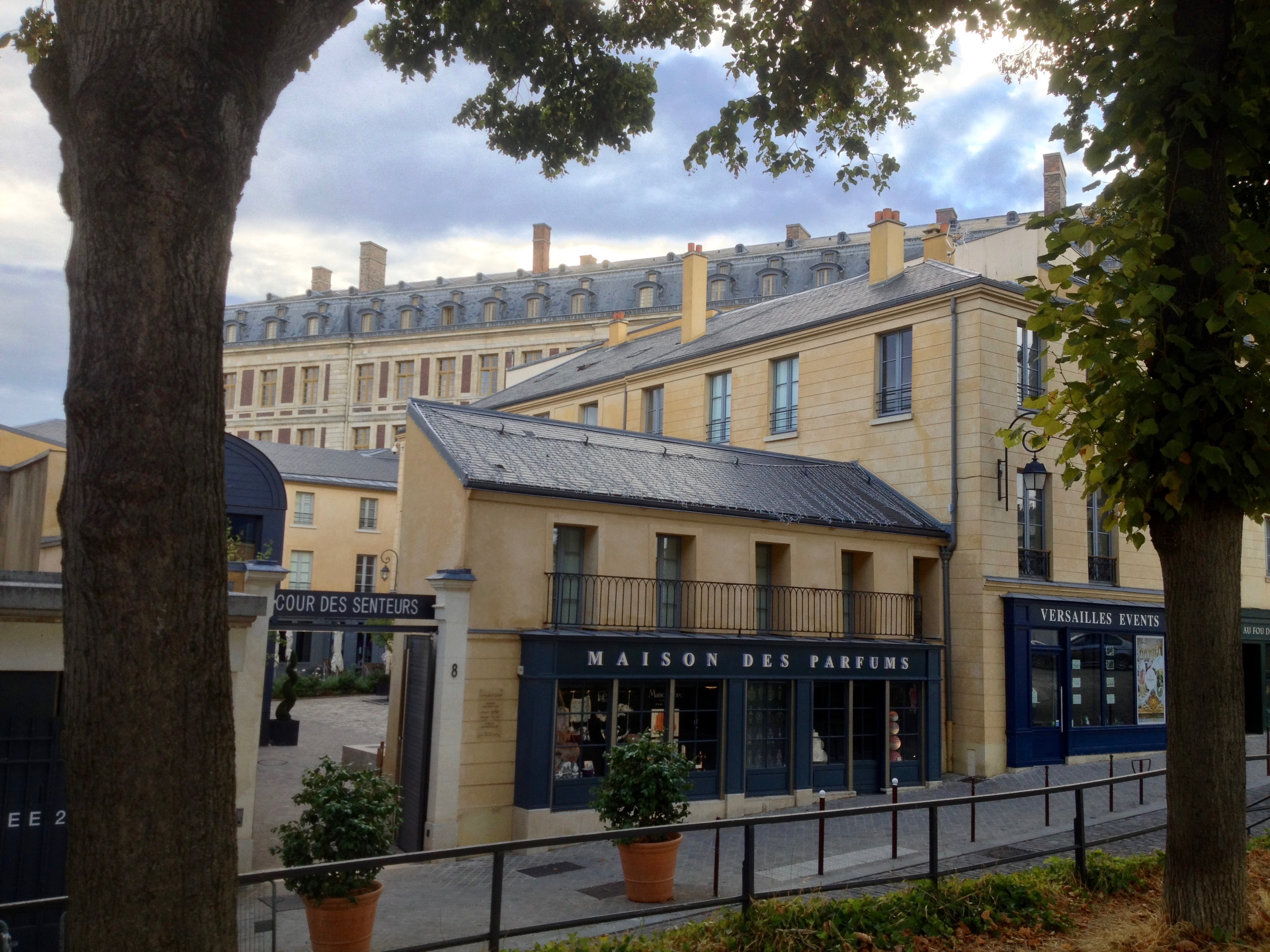
Entrance of la Cour des Senteurs

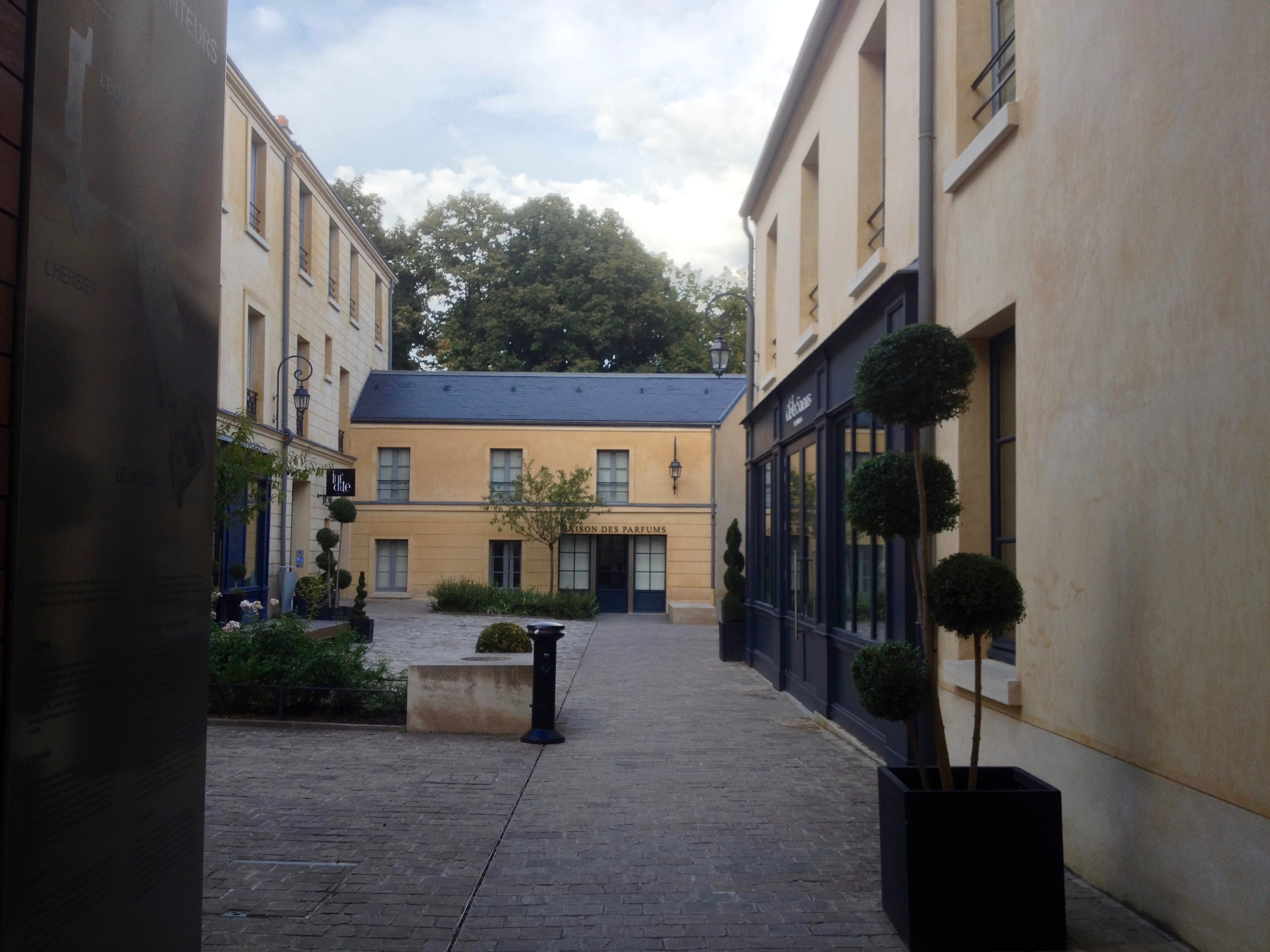
The courtyard

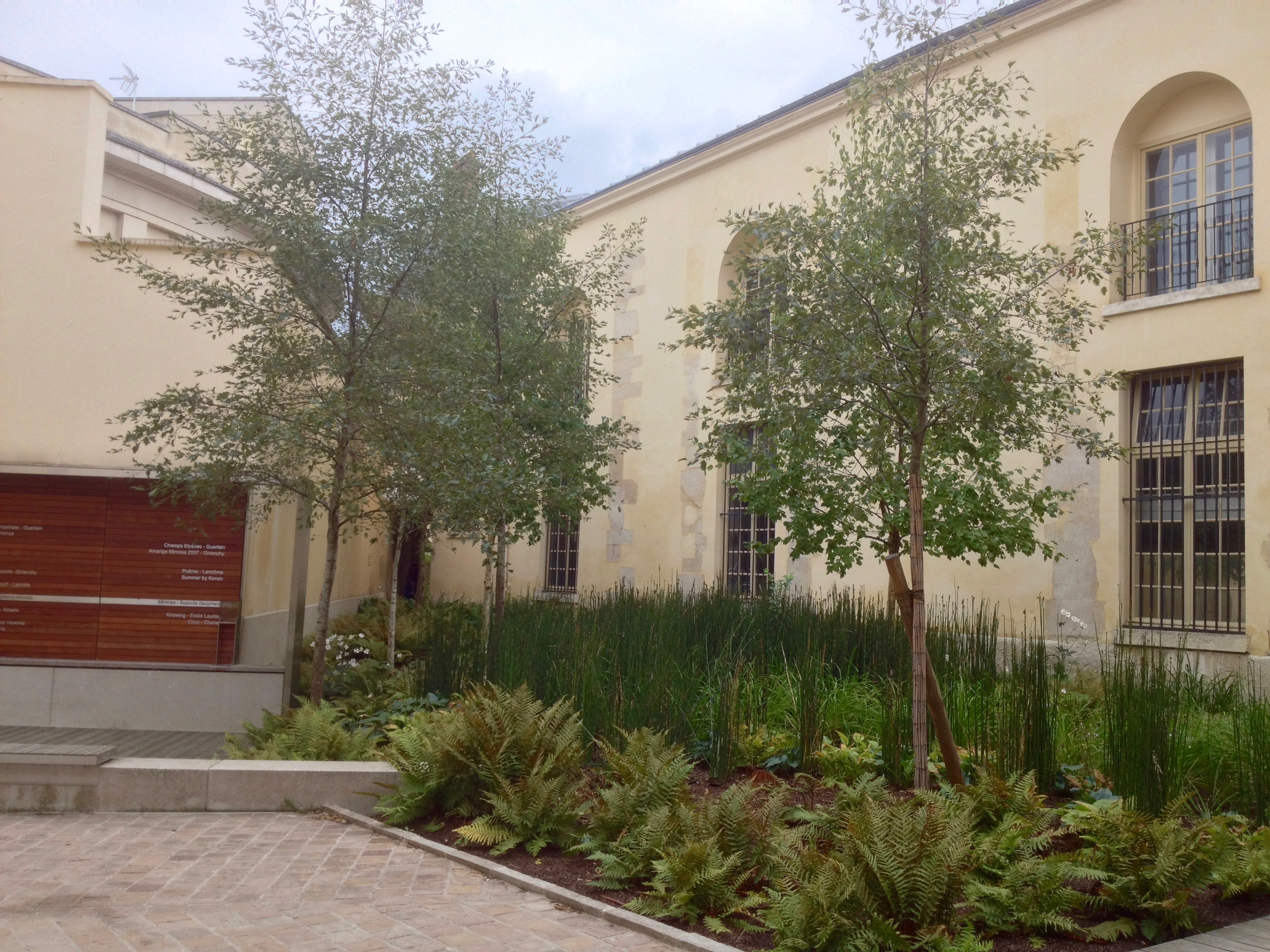
Square with description panels about perfumes

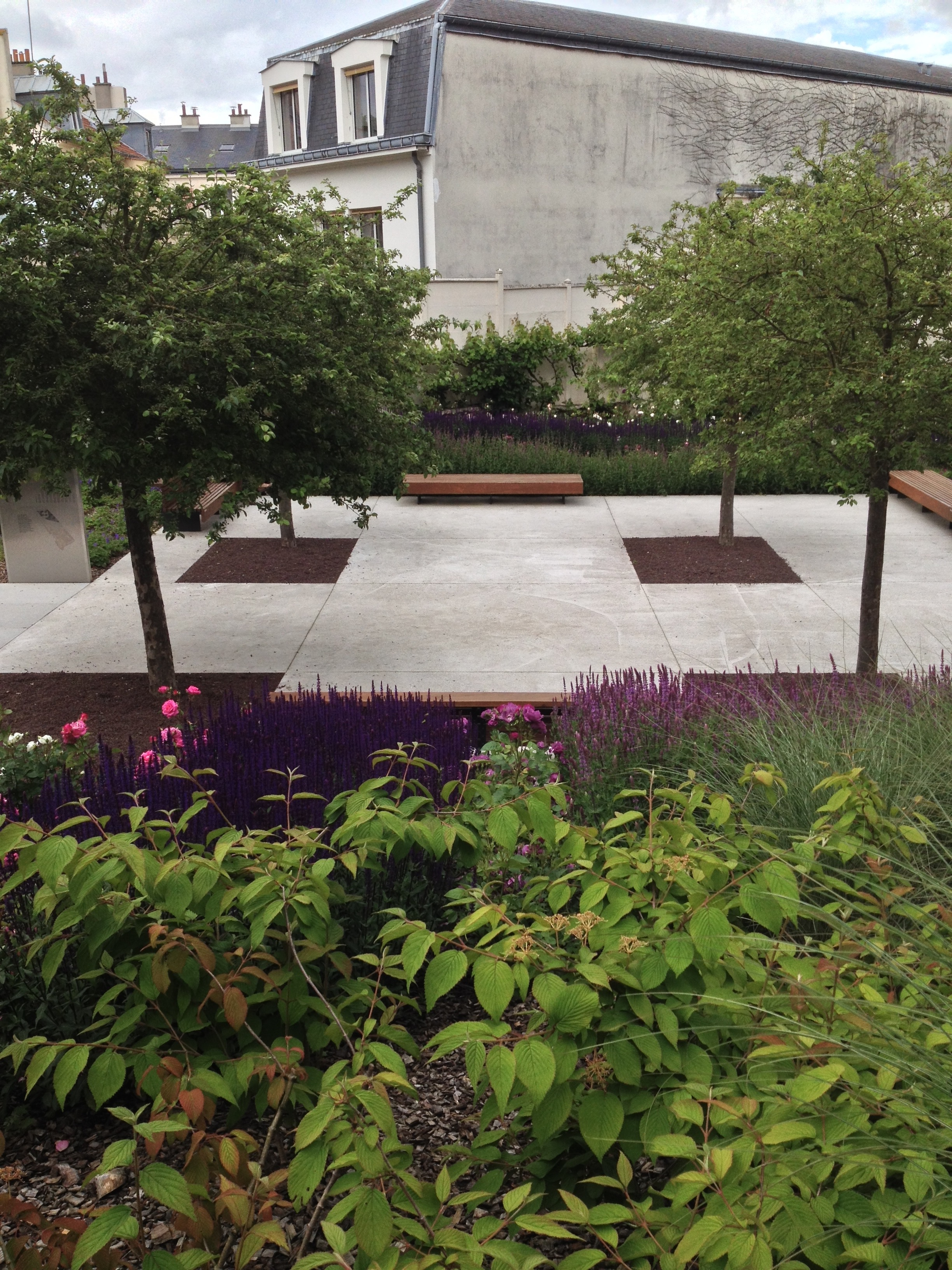
Jardin des Senteurs, completed in 2013

== Origin of the area ==
The building at the entrance was an extension of a property owned by Philippe de Courcillon, marquis de Dangeau. Then it had been affected by the body guard officers of Louis XVIII, formerly the Count of Provence.

Construction of the original building started in 17th century, the extension being added in the 19th century.

In 1930, the building was registered in the Monuments historiques (national heritage site in France).

In 2013, la Cour des Senteurs was inaugurated as one of the projects of l’Année Le Notre (Le Notre Year).

"The first Court which had been a part of the first city project in 1685, planned by Le Notre and Le Vau for the area around la place d’Armes, became an isolated island forgotten and degraded through the centuries." explained François de Mazières, Deputy-Mayor of Versailles. The City of Versailles launched the project "la Cour des Senteurs" to represent an urban crossing between la Place d’Armes and the Saint-Louis area.

== Restoration of la Cour des Senteurs ==
Project owner: City of Versailles

Architect: For the initial plan of "Maison des Parfums", an exhibition space of the perfume history, Philippe Pumain, architect and museographer, in collaboration with Elisabeth de Feydeau (fr), historian of perfume. (Maison des Parfums was replaced by a food service space in 2018.)

The buildings surrounding the court have been modified for receiving visitors.

"The over-hanged structure of the display window has been modified, because here we don’t have enough pedestrian area in la rue de Chancellerie, although we need to attract and invite the maximum visitors into this public space. Two extensions inside of the court have been also demolished. Finally, the front side of la Maison des Parfums has been restructured with an image of the perfumes shop of former period". described Philippe Pumain.

== Historical site of Saint-Louis area ==
Several other historical sites in walking distance are:

- Salle de Jeu de Paume (Royal Tennis court)
- Cathédrale Saint-Louis (Cathedral of Versailles)
- Potager du Roi (King’s Kitchen garden)
- Parc Balbi (Park of the Comtesse Balbi)

== Collaboration ==
Certain organizations collaborate for events taking place in la Cour des Senteurs:

- ISIPCA (Institut Supérieur International de la Parfumerie, Cosmétique et Aromatique Alimentaire)
- Osmothèque, Conservatoire International des Parfums
