= List of legislative constituencies of the Pas-de-Calais department =

France is divided into 577 constituencies (circonscriptions) for the election of deputies to the lower legislative House, the National Assembly (539 in Metropolitan France, 27 in the overseas departments and territories, and 11 for French residents overseas). Deputies are elected in a two-round system to a term fixed to a maximum of five years. The department of Pas-de-Calais has 12 Members of Parliament.

== History ==
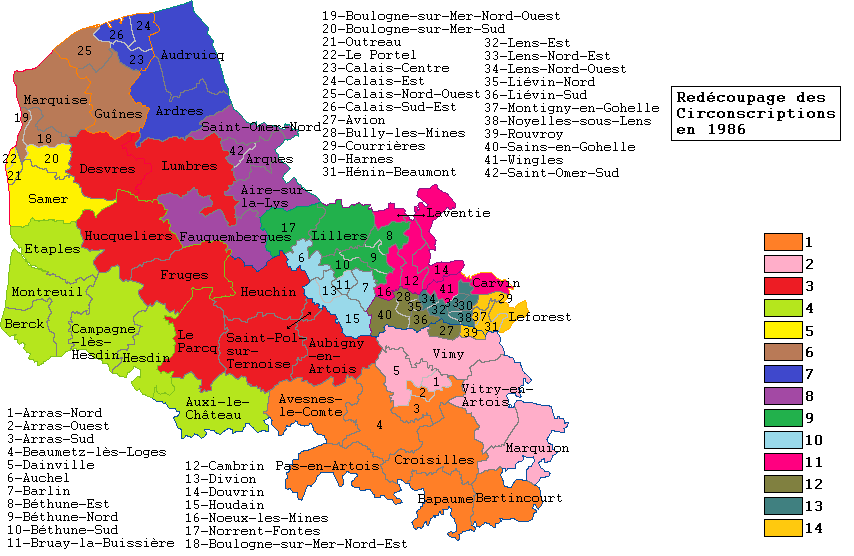
A map of constituencies in Pas-de-Calais in 1986.

The department of Pas-de-Calais, in 1986 was divided into 14 legislative districts.

== List ==
=== Current ===
Constituency	Member	Party
Pas-de-Calais's 1st constituency	Emmanuel Blairy	National Rally
Pas-de-Calais's 2nd constituency	Agnès Pannier-Runacher	Renaissance
Pas-de-Calais's 3rd constituency	Bruno Clavet	National Rally
Pas-de-Calais's 4th constituency	Philippe Fait	Renaissance
Pas-de-Calais's 5th constituency	Antoine Golliot	National Rally
Pas-de-Calais's 6th constituency	Christine Engrand	National Rally
Pas-de-Calais's 7th constituency	Marc de Fleurian	National Rally
Pas-de-Calais's 8th constituency	Auguste Evrard	National Rally
Pas-de-Calais's 9th constituency	Caroline Parmentier	National Rally
Pas-de-Calais's 10th constituency	Thierry Frappé	National Rally
Pas-de-Calais's 11th constituency	Marine Le Pen	National Rally
Pas-de-Calais's 12th constituency	Bruno Bilde	National Rally

=== Defunct ===
Constituency	Dates in use
Pas-de-Calais' 13th constituency	1988 to 2012
Pas-de-Calais' 14th constituency	1988 to 2012
