= National Union for Territories Group =

French Senate parliamentary group

National Union for Territories Group Groupe Union nationale pour les territoires
- Chamber: Senate
- Member parties: National Rally; Union of the Right for the Republic
- President: Edwige Diaz
- Constituency: Gironde
- Representation: 15 / 348
- Ideology: National conservatism; Economic liberalism; Right-wing populism

The National Union for Territories Group (French: groupe Union nationale pour les territoires, UNT) is a parliamentary group in the French Senate, the indirectly elected upper house of the French Parliament. The group comprising 15 sénateurs primarily from the National Rally (RN) and the Union of the Right for the Republic (UDR). It was formed following the 2026 French Senate election, in which the two parties obtained enough seats to form a group for the first time.

The group has been chaired by Edwige Diaz, senator for Gironde, since 2026.

== History ==
The National Rally (then the National Front) entered the Senate for the first time following the 2014 French Senate election, in which Stéphane Ravier and David Rachline were elected senators. The party made a further breakthrough in the 2023 French Senate election, with the election of Christopher Szczurek, Aymeric Durox and Joshua Hochart.

Until 2026, RN elected officials sit on the administrative meeting of senators not on the list of any group (RASNAG). In 2023, Christopher Szczurek became a delegate of the RASNAG, equivalent to a parliamentary group president, responsible for representing and defending the rights of "non-inscrit" senators.

In the 2026 French Senate election, the National Rally (RN) intended to capitalize on its success in the municipal elections to reach the threshold of ten senators needed to form a parliamentary group. The party aimed to hold between "9 and 13 seats" in total after the election, in addition to the senators from the Union of the Right for the Republic (UDR), expected in the Alpes-Maritimes department. Ultimately, nine senators from the RN (in addition to the three already serving in the Senate, whose terms were up for renewal in 2029) and three senators from the UDR were elected in this election, allowing the two parties to form their first parliamentary group in the upper house. The group was officially created on 5 October 2026, at the time of filing the lists and declarations of the parliamentary groups, under the name "National Union for the Territories".

== Leadership ==
=== President ===
President	Party	Since	Department
Edwige Diaz	RN	5 October 2026	Gironde

=== Vice-president ===
Vice-president	Party	Since	Department
Laurent Castillo	UDR	5 October 2026	Alpes-Maritimes

== Composition ==
Members of the group at its creation
Series	Department	Name	Party
Séries 1	Nord	Joshua Hochart	RN
Séries 1	Pas-de-Calais	Christopher Szczurek	RN
Séries 1	Seine-et-Marne	Aymeric Durox	RN
Séries 2	Ain	Sylvie Goy-Chavent	app. UDR
Séries 2	Alpes-Maritimes	Laurent Castillo	UDR
Séries 2	Alpes-Maritimes	Gaëlle Frontoni	UDR
Séries 2	Bouches-du-Rhône	Marie-Pierre Callet	RN
Séries 2	Bouches-du-Rhône	Fabien Bravi	RN
Séries 2	Gard	Sylvie Josserand	RN
Séries 2	Gironde	Edwige Diaz	RN
Séries 2	Hérault	Manon Bouquin	RN
Séries 2	Seine-Maritime	Léon Levasseur	RN
Séries 2	Var	Frank Giletti	RN
Séries 2	Var	Carine Leroy	RN
Séries 2	Vaucluse	Thierry d'Aigremont	RN

== See also ==
- Groupe Rassemblement national (Assemblée nationale)
- Groupe Union des droites pour la République
- Union de l'extrême droite
