= Aurélia Beigneux =

French politician (born 1980)

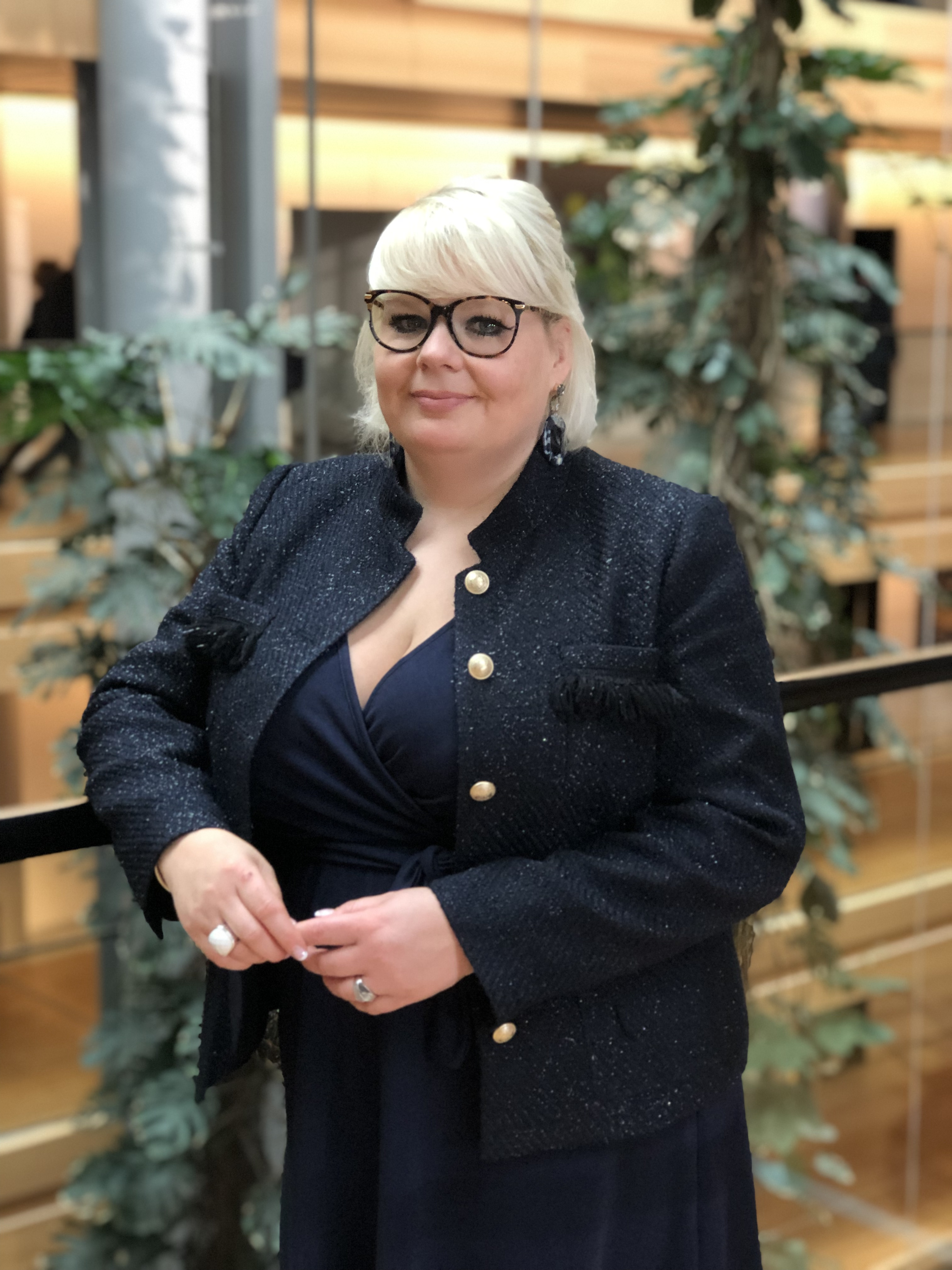
- Beigneux in 2024

Member of the European Parliament
- In office 2 July 2019 – 15 July 2024
- Constituency: France

Departmental councillor of Pas-de-Calais for the canton of Hénin-Beaumont-2
- In office 2 April 2015 – 1 July 2021 Serving with Christopher Szczurek
- Preceded by: Canton established
- Succeeded by: Marine Le Pen

Personal details
- Born: 2 June 1980 (age 45) Rillé, France
- Party: National Rally

Aurélia Beigneux (French pronunciation: [oʁelja bɛɲø]; born 2 June 1980) is a French politician who served as a Member of the European Parliament (MEP) from 2019 to 2024. A member of the National Rally (RN), she also held a seat in the Departmental Council of Pas-de-Calais from 2015 to 2021.

== Political career ==
In the 2012 legislative election, Beigneux unsuccessfully ran for the National Assembly in the 9th constituency of Pas-de-Calais, placing third with 16.8% of the first-round vote.

Following the 2014 municipal election, she became Deputy Mayor of Hénin-Beaumont for social affairs under Mayor Steeve Briois, a position she held until 2020. In 2015, she was elected to the Departmental Council of Pas-de-Calais in the canton of Hénin-Beaumont-2. From 2017 to 2021 Beigneux was an administrator of Epinorpa, a housing local public establishment (établissement public local) founded in 2002. In 2021, she did not run for reelection as a departmental councillor.

Beigneux was fourteenth on the National Rally list for the European Parliament in the 2019 election, thus winning a seat. She did not run for reelection in 2024.

== Controversy ==
In 2015, Beigneux was accused of welfare fraud following the Pas-de-Calais Caisse d'allocations familiales (CAF) opening a litigation case. She denied having unduly benefitted from the Revenu de solidarité active (RSA) after she left a previous position. The Pas-de-Calais CAF reported Beigneux did not declare all her revenues when filing benefit statements.
