= José Évrard =

French politician (1945–2022)

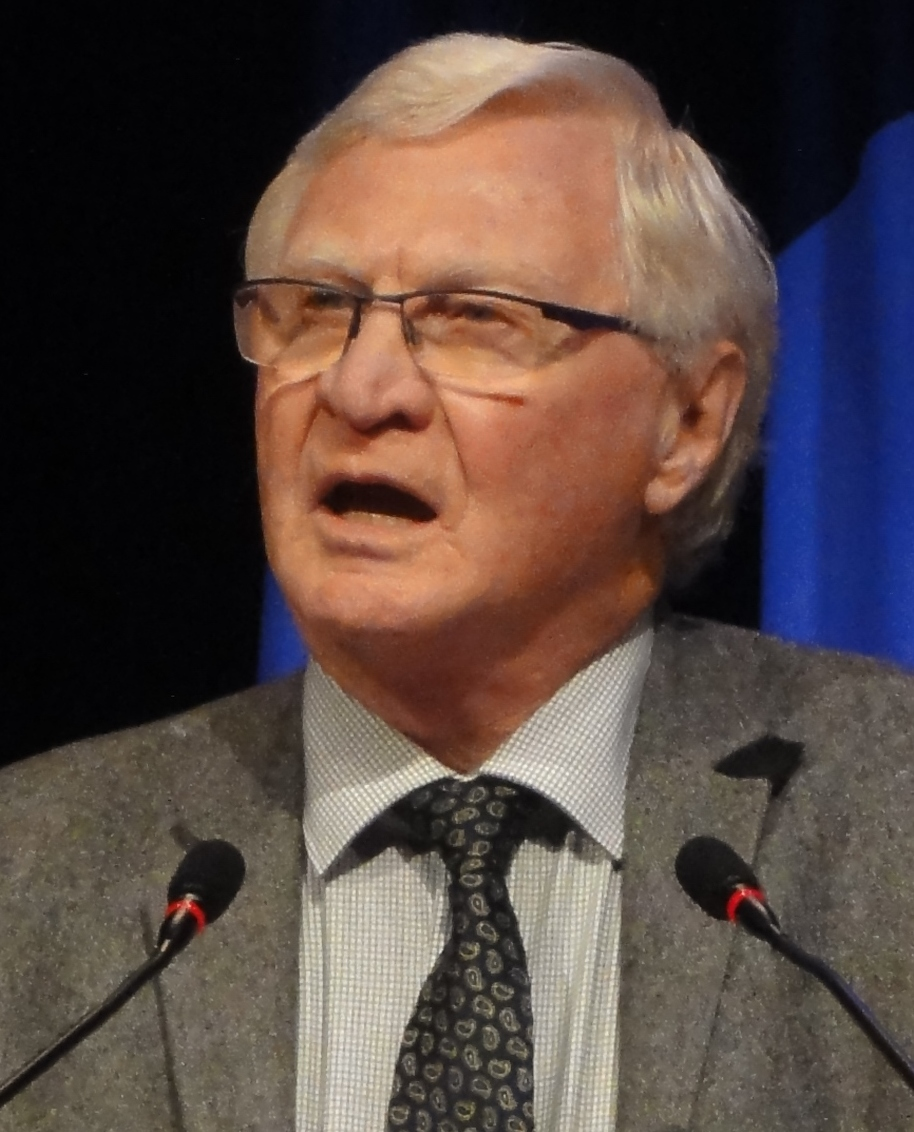
- Évrard speaking at the founding congress of The Patriots on 2018

Member of the National Assembly for Pas-de-Calais's 3rd constituency
- In office 21 June 2017 – 7 January 2022
- Preceded by: Guy Delcourt
- Succeeded by: Emmanuel Blairy

Departmental Councillor of Pas-de-Calais
- In office 29 March 2015 – 18 June 2017 Serving with Guylaine Jacquart
- Succeeded by: Anthony Garénaux
- Constituency: Canton of Harnes

Personal details
- Born: 17 July 1945 Cauchy-à-la-Tour, France
- Died: 7 January 2022 (aged 76) Arras, France
- Party: Debout la France (2020–2022)
- Other political affiliations: National Front (2013–2017); The Patriots (2017–2020)

José Évrard (French pronunciation: [ʒoze evʁaʁ]; 17 July 1945 – 7 January 2022) was a French politician serving as the member of the National Assembly for the 3rd constituency of Pas-de-Calais since 2017. He was a member of the National Front (FN) until 2017, when he joined The Patriots (LP), which he left in 2020 to become a member of Debout la France (DLF).

== Life and career ==
A native of Cauchy-à-la-Tour, Évrard joined the National Front in 2013. He served as a member of the Departmental Council of Pas-de-Calais for the canton of Harnes from 29 March 2015 to 18 June 2017.

In the 2017 legislative election, Évrard was elected to the National Assembly in the 3rd constituency of Pas-de-Calais. He joined Florian Philippot's The Patriots later that year, dissatisfied with Marine Le Pen's softened Eurosceptic stance. In 2020, he joined Nicolas Dupont-Aignan's Debout la France; he was subsequently chosen to lead the party's list in the 2021 regional election in Hauts-de-France. The list placed sixth in the first round of voting, thus failing to qualify for the second round.

Évrard died from COVID-19 on 7 January 2022, at the age of 76. Previously he had expressed support on social media for protesters against COVID-19 curbs and health measures.
