= Jean-Claude Leroy =

French politician

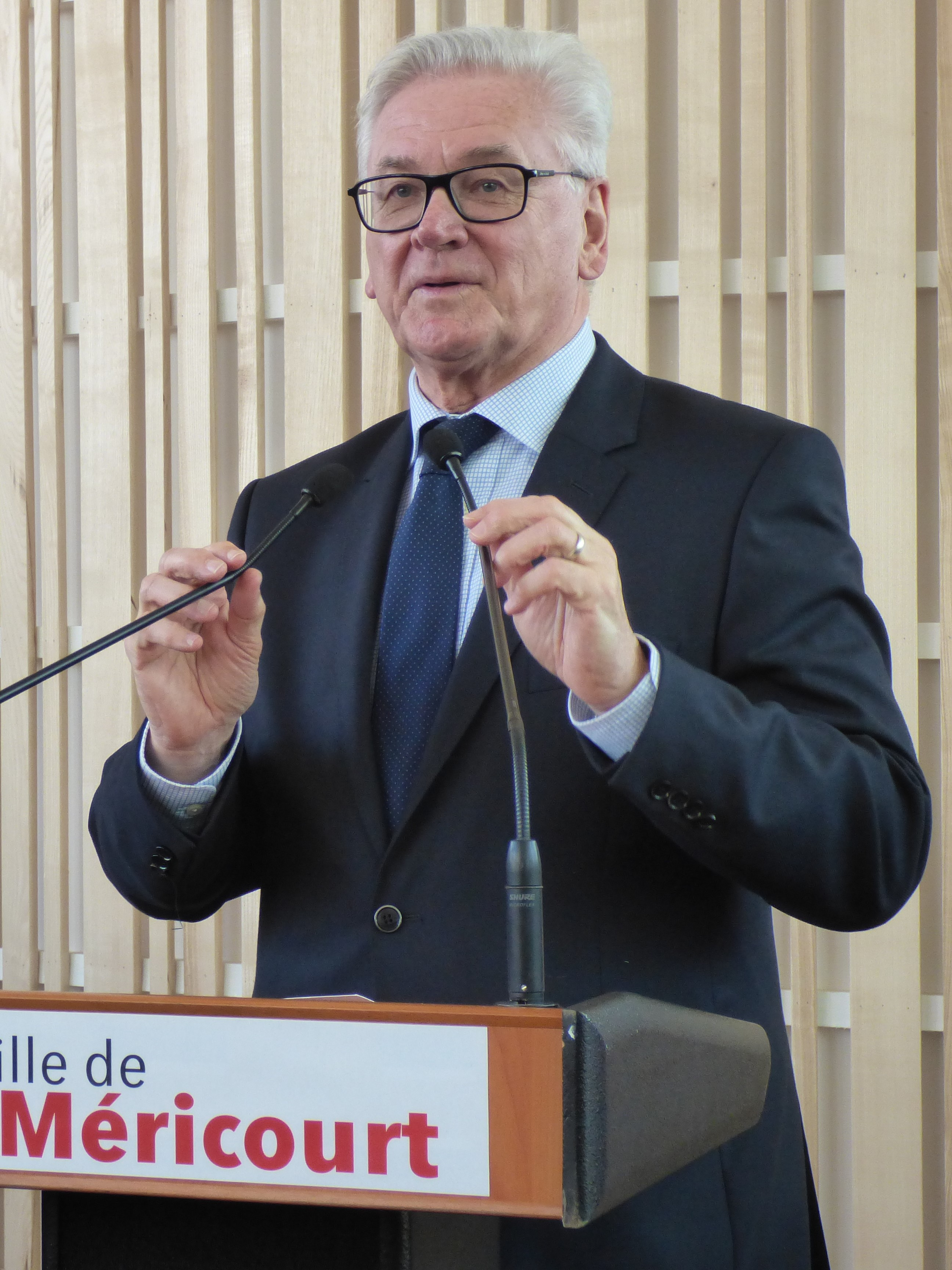
- Jean-Claude Leroy during an inauguration in Méricourt, in the Pas-de-Calais, April 2019

President of the Department council of Pas-de-Calais
- Incumbent
- Assumed office 13 November 2017
- Preceded by: Michel Dagbert

Member of the French Senate for Pas-de-Calais
- In office 2011–2017

Member of the National Assembly for Pas-de-Calais's 3rd constituency
- In office 2002–2011
- Preceded by: Philippe Vasseur
- Succeeded by: Guy Delcourt

Personal details
- Born: 3 June 1952 (age 73) Wavrans-sur-l'Aa, France
- Party: Socialist Party

Jean-Claude Leroy (born 3 June 1952 in Wavrans-sur-l'Aa) is a former member of the National Assembly of France. He represented the Pas-de-Calais department, and is a member of the Socialist Party, part of the Socialiste, radical, citoyen et divers gauche group.

He has been president of the Departmental Council of Pas-de-Calais since 2017.
