= Guy Delcourt (politician) =

French politician (1947–2020)

Member of the National Assembly of France from Pas-de-Calais
- In office 20 June 2007 – 20 June 2017
- Preceded by: Jean-Claude Bois
- Succeeded by: José Évrard
- Parliamentary group: SRC (2007–2016); SER (2016–2017)
- Constituency: 13th (2007–2012); 3rd (2012–2017)

Mayor of Lens
- In office 14 October 1998 – 16 June 2013
- Preceded by: André Delelis
- Succeeded by: Sylvain Robert

General Councillor of Pas-de-Calais
- In office 11 March 2001 – 1 July 2007
- Preceded by: Claudette Grosse-Erouart
- Succeeded by: Ghislaine Clin
- Constituency: Canton of Lens-Nord-Ouest

Personal details
- Born: 13 July 1947 Palaiseau, France
- Died: 31 January 2020 (aged 72) Arras, France
- Party: PS (until 2017)

Guy Delcourt (13 July 1947 – 31 January 2020) was a French politician, a member of the National Assembly. He represented the Pas-de-Calais department, and was a member of the Socialist Party and of the Socialiste, radical, citoyen et divers gauche parliamentary group.

== Electoral mandates ==
=== National mandates ===
- 20 June 2007 – 19 June 2012: Member of the National Assembly for Pas-de-Calais's 13th constituency
- 20 June 2012 – 20 June 2017: Member of the National Assembly for Pas-de-Calais's 3rd constituency

=== Local mandates ===
To the General Council:

- 11 March 2001 – 1 July 2007: General Councillor of Pas-de-Calais for the Canton of Lens-Nord-Ouest
- 2004 – 2005: Vice-president of the general council of Pas-de-Calais

To the Communauté de Communes:

- 2001 – 2008: First vice-president of the communauté d'agglomération de Lens – Liévin

To the Municipal Council:

- 11 June 1995 – 13 October 1998: Deputy mayor of Lens, Pas-de-Calais, in charge of culture, youth, and the prevention of delinquency
- 14 October 1998 – 16 June 2013: Mayor of Lens, Pas-de-Calais
