= Nicolas Bays =

French politician

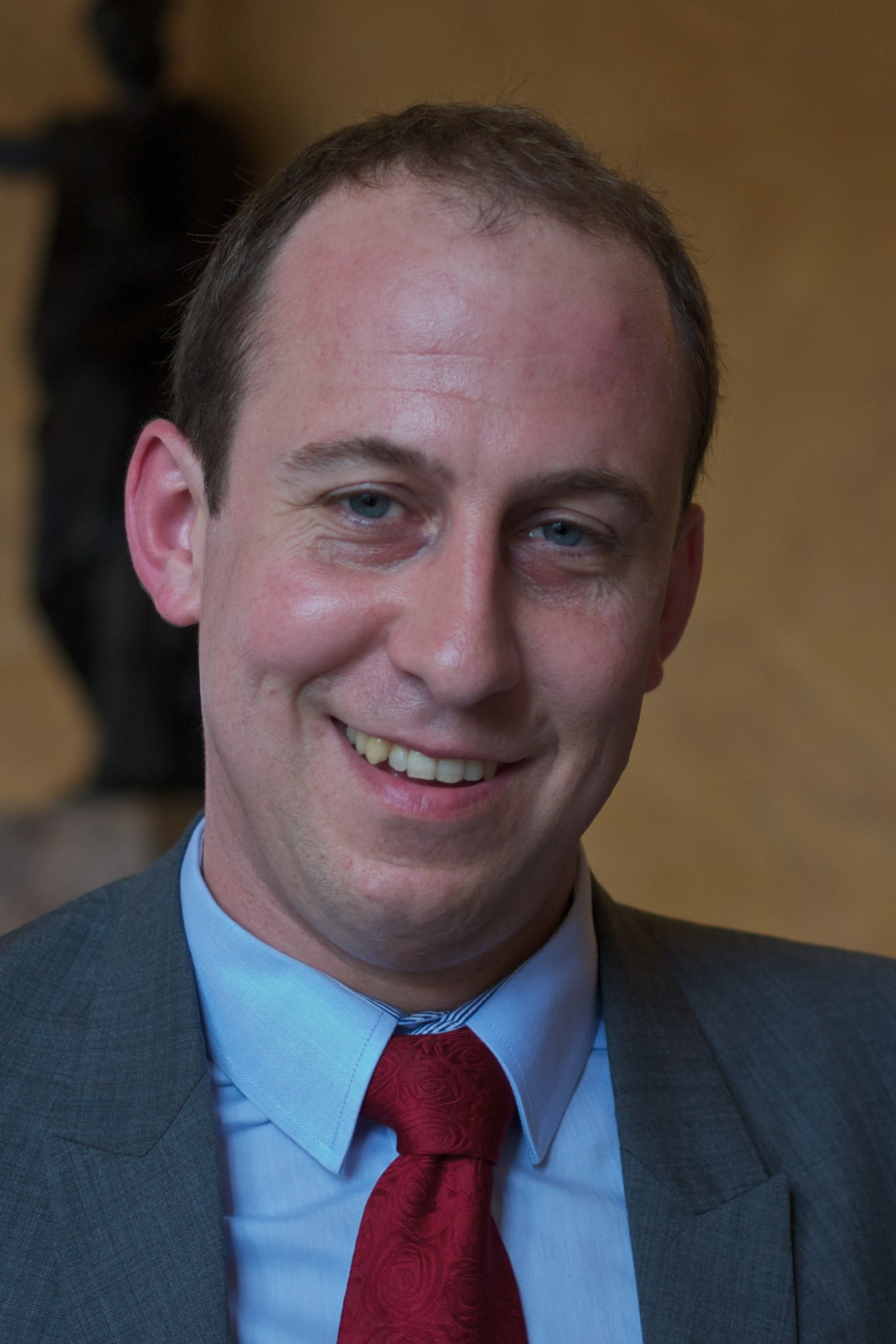

Member of the National Assembly for Pas-de-Calais's 12th constituency
- In office 20 June 2012 – 20 June 2017
- Preceded by: Jean-Pierre Kucheida
- Succeeded by: Bruno Bilde

Personal details
- Born: 1 May 1977 (age 48) Béthune, France
- Party: Renaissance (2016–present)
- Other political affiliations: Socialist Party (1997–2016)
- Spouse: Aurore Bergé (m. 2009; div. 2015)
- Domestic partner: Agnès Pannier-Runacher (2023-present)

Nicolas Bays (born 1 May 1977) is a French politician. Formerly of the Socialist Party and now of Renaissance, he currently serves as a municipal councillor in Wingles, in Northern France. From 2012 through 2017, he held the position of deputy for Pas-de-Calais's 12th constituency.

Having been previously married to politician Aurore Bergé, Bays joined the La République en Marche movement in 2016. In May 2021, he confirmed his relationship with French Minister of Energy Agnès Pannier-Runacher, for whom he served as chief of staff since December 2020. However, Article 11 of the 2017 law on trust in French political life prohibits a government member from including their spouse or partner in their cabinet, with potential consequences of 3 years imprisonment and a fine of 45,000 euros for non-compliance. Consequently, Nicolas Bays' functions were terminated on 9 May. Nevertheless, according to Mediapart, he continued exerting influence by giving orders or pressuring the employees of the ministerial cabinet.

In the 2022 legislative elections, Nicolas Bays ran as the LREM candidate in Pas-de-Calais's 3rd constituency but was defeated in the first round by the National Rally and NUPES.

On 12 July 2022, he was appointed as an adviser to Patricia Mirallès, Secretary of State to the Minister of the Armed Forces, with a focus on veterans and memory. Furthermore, he served as a columnist on the French television show C'est que de la télé from 2019 to 2020.
