= Pas-de-Calais's 3rd constituency =

Constituency of the National Assembly of France

3rd constituency of the Pas-de-Calais
- inline Constituency of the National Assembly of France

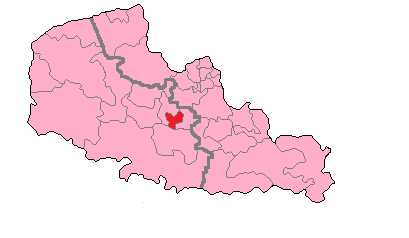
- Pas de Calais' 3rd constituency shown with Nord-Pas-de-Calais
- Deputy: Bruno Clavet; RN
- Department: Pas-de-Calais
- Cantons: Avion, Harnes, Lens-Est, Lens-Nord-Est, Lens-Nord-Ouest, Noyelles-sous-Lens
- Registered voters: 87,344

The 3rd constituency of the Pas-de-Calais is a French legislative constituency in the Pas-de-Calais département.

== Description ==
Pas-de-Calais' 3rd constituency is based around the city of Lens in the heart of the department famed for its football team and its mines.

Until 2017, the seat was held by Guy Delcourt who previously represented Pas-de-Calais' 13th constituency until its extinction as a result of the 2010 redistricting of French legislative constituencies. In 2017 the seat was won by José Évrard of the National Front, however in November of that year he joined the breakaway The Patriots party led by Florian Philippot. Évrard died in January 2022 and was replaced by his substitute Emmanuel Blairy from the National Rally.

== Historic representation ==
Election	Member	Party
1986	Philippe Vasseur Brigitte de Prémont (1995 to 1997)	UDF
1993	Philippe Vasseur Brigitte de Prémont (1995 to 1997)	UDF
1997	Philippe Vasseur Brigitte de Prémont (1995 to 1997)	UDF
2002	Jean-Claude Leroy	PS
2007	Jean-Claude Leroy	PS
2012	Guy Delcourt	PS
2017	José Évrard	FN
2017	José Évrard	LP
2022	Emmanuel Blairy	FN
2022	Jean-Marc Tellier	PCF
2024	Bruno Clavet	RN

== Election results ==
=== 2024 ===
Candidate	Party	Alliance	First round			Second round		
Candidate	Party	Alliance	Votes	%	+/–	Votes	%	+/–
Bruno Clavet	RN		25,200	52.40	+14.05			
Jean-Marc Tellier	PCF	NFP	15,530	32.29	-3.27			
François Queste	RE	Ensemble	4,427	9.21	-3.66			
Jacques Duquenne	UDI		1,586	3.30	new			
Michel Darras	LO		800	1.66	-0.31			
Michèle Lejeune	REC		546	1.14	-1.29			
Votes			48,089	100.00				
Valid votes			48,089	97.46	-0.40			
Blank votes			824	1.67	+0.33			
Null votes			427	0.87	+0.07			
Turnout			49,340	59.42	+17.63			
Abstentions			33,701	40.58	-17.63			
Registered voters			83,041					
Result			RN GAIN FROM PCF					

=== 2022 ===
Legislative Election 2022: Pas-de-Calais's 3rd constituency
Party	Candidate	Votes	%	±%
RN	Bruno Clavet	13,050	38.35	+6.66
PCF (NUPÉS)	Jean-Marc Tellier	12,101	35.56	-4.53
LREM (Ensemble)	Nicolas Bays	4,379	12.87	−4.12
PA	Alexandrea Damay	861	2.53	N/A
LREM	Elodie Fievet*	860	2.53	N/A
REC	Guillaume Kaznowski	826	2.43	N/A
DVG	Arnaud Desmaretz	685	2.01	N/A
Others	N/A	1,264		
Turnout		34,026	41.79	−2.58
2nd round result
PCF (NUPÉS)	Jean-Marc Tellier	16,294	50.11	N/A
RN	Bruno Clavet	16,223	49.89	−4.05
Turnout		32,517	41.67	+2.22
PCF gain from RN				

* LREM dissident

=== 2017 ===
Candidate	Label	First round		Second round	
Candidate	Label	Votes	%	Votes	%
José Évrard	FN	11,707	31.69	16,298	52.94
Patrick Debruyne	MoDem	6,276	16.99	14,485	47.06
Jean-Marc Tellier	PCF	6,055	16.39		
Djordje Kuzmanovic	FI	4,172	11.29		
Frédérique Masson	PS	3,310	8.96		
Sabine Banach-Finez	LR	1,752	4.74		
Jamel Oufqir	ECO	1,275	3.45		
Hugues Sion	EXD	903	2.44		
Michel Darras	EXG	696	1.88		
Caroline Marie	DIV	395	1.07		
Brigitte Levat	ECO	259	0.70		
Jean-Luc Flahaut	DVG	140	0.38		
Votes		36,940	100.00	30,783	100.00
Valid votes		36,940	97.26	30,783	91.14
Blank votes		627	1.65	1,995	5.91
Null votes		415	1.09	999	2.96
Turnout		37,982	44.37	33,777	39.45
Abstentions		47,629	55.63	51,834	60.55
Registered voters		85,611		85,611	
Source: Ministry of the Interior

=== 2012 ===
Legislative Election 2012: Pas-de-Calais's 3rd constituency
Party	Candidate	Votes	%	±%
PS	Guy Delcourt	15,325	33.80	−10.54
FN	Freddy Baudrin	11,190	24.68	+20.19
FG	Bruno Troni	7,695	16.97	N/A
UMP	Sophie Gauthy	5,298	11.69	−21.95
EELV	Jean-François Caron	3,128	6.90	N/A
DIV	Bénoni Delvallez	1,078	2.38	N/A
Others	N/A	1,623		
Turnout		45,337	51.90	−18.45
2nd round result
PS	Guy Delcourt	25,286	59.53	+2.45
FN	Freddy Baudrin	17,188	40.47	N/A
Turnout		42,474	48.63	−23.03
PS hold				

=== 2007 ===
Legislative Election 2007: Pas-de-Calais's 3rd constituency
Party	Candidate	Votes	%	±%
PS	Jean-Claude Leroy	22,956	44.34	
UMP	Hélène Magnier	17,417	33.64	
MoDem	Francis Hennebelle	2,575	4.97	
FN	Marion Auffray	2,324	4.49	
CPNT	Corinne Desutter	1,803	3.48	
MPF	Françoise Bonnard	1,076	2.08	
Others	N/A	3,617		
Turnout		53,024	70.35	
2nd round result
PS	Jean-Claude Leroy	30,001	57.08	
UMP	Hélène Magnier	22,556	42.92	
Turnout		54,012	71.66	
PS hold				

=== 2002 ===
Legislative Election 2002: Pas-de-Calais's 3rd constituency
Party	Candidate	Votes	%	±%
PS	Jean-Claude Leroy	20,147	39.09	
UMP	Brigitte de Premont	17,220	33.41	
FN	Catherine Mancheron	4,898	9.50	
CPNT	Jean-Louis Desvignes	3,044	5.91	
PCF	Alain Libert	1,499	2.91	
Others	N/A	4,736		
Turnout		53,064	72.68	
2nd round result
PS	Jean-Claude Leroy	27,590	53.66	
UMP	Brigitte de Premont	23,822	46.34	
Turnout		53,704	73.56	
PS gain from UDF				

=== 1997 ===
Legislative Election 1997: Pas-de-Calais's 3rd constituency
Party	Candidate	Votes	%	±%
UDF	Philippe Vasseur	25,954	46.60	
PS	Jean-Claude Leroy	19,182	34.44	
FN	Jean-Pierre D'Hollander	4,586	8.23	
PCF	Alain Libert	3,641	6.54	
LV	Jean-Luc Delecroix	1,341	2.41	
Others	N/A	988		
Turnout		58,055	84.00	
2nd round result
UDF	Philippe Vasseur	30,141	53.43	
PS	Jean-Claude Leroy	26,272	46.57	
Turnout		58,658	84.89	
UDF hold				

== Sources ==
- Official results of French elections from 1998: "Résultats électoraux officiels en France" (in French).
