= Wavrans =

Wavrans may refer to two communes in the Pas-de-Calais department in northern France:

- Wavrans-sur-l'Aa
- Wavrans-sur-Ternoise
