= Brigitte de Prémont =

French politician (1935–2024)

Deputy of the French National Assembly for Pas-de-Calais's 3rd constituency
- In office 18 May 1995 – 1 June 1997
- Preceded by: Philippe Vasseur
- Succeeded by: Philippe Vasseur

Mayor of Bellebrune
- In office 1971–2014
- Succeeded by: Christophe Guche

Personal details
- Born: Brigitte Van Cappel de Prémont; 25 October 1935 Neuilly-sur-Seine, France
- Died: 11 February 2024 (aged 88) Bellebrune, France
- Party: UDR; RPR; UMP

Brigitte de Prémont (25 October 1935 – 11 February 2024) was a French politician of the Union for a Popular Movement (UMP).

De Prémont served as Mayor of Bellebrune from 1971 to 2014 and was a Deputy of the National Assembly from 1995 to 1997, serving in place of Philippe Vasseur for Pas-de-Calais's 3rd constituency.

De Prémont died on 11 February 2024, at the age of 88.
