= Jean-Pierre Kucheida =

French politician

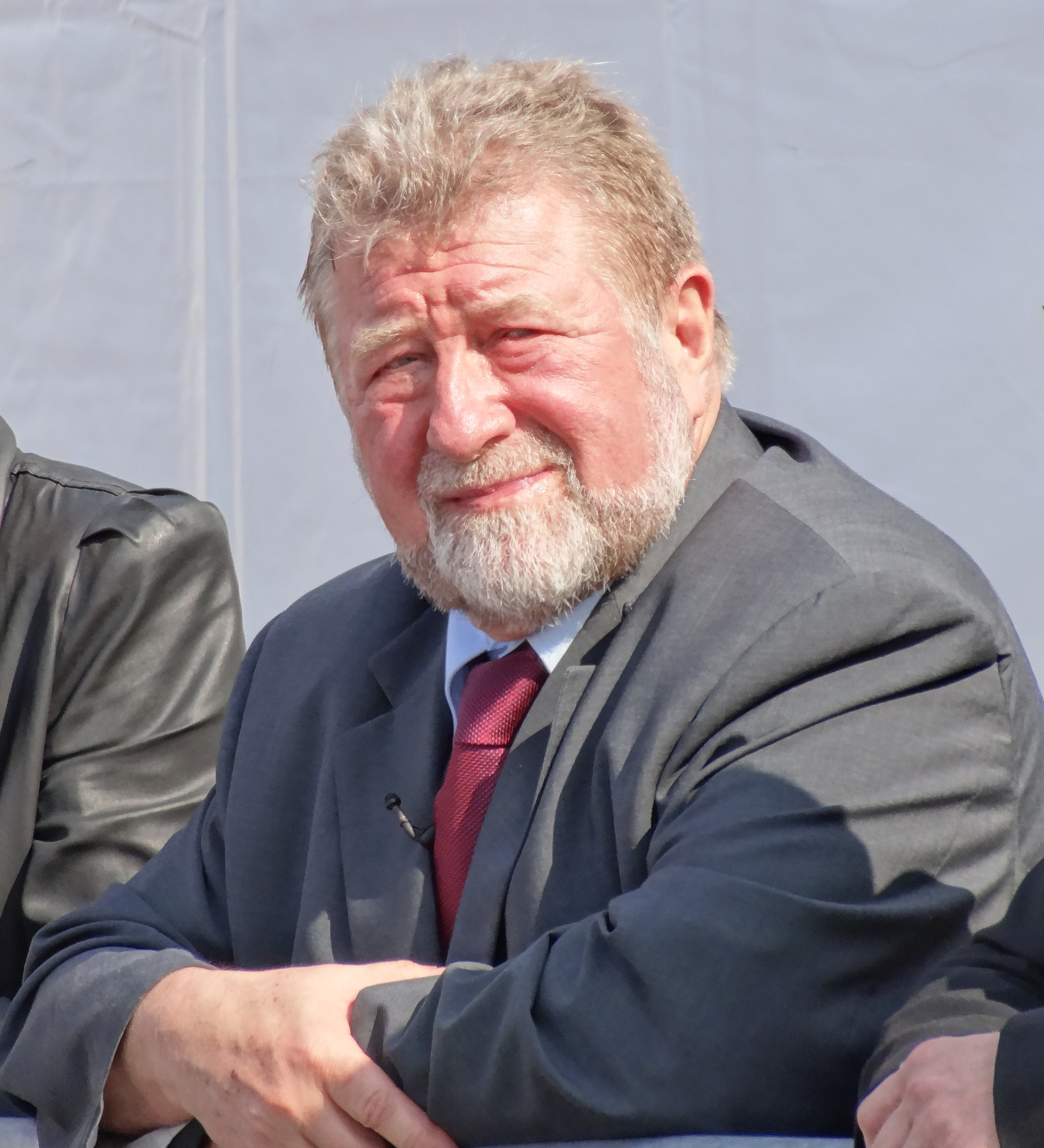
- Jean-Pierre Kucheida in 2013

Member of the National Assembly for Pas-de-Calais's 12th constituency
- In office 23 June 1988 – 19 June 2012
- Preceded by: None
- Succeeded by: Nicolas Bays

Personal details
- Born: 24 February 1943 (age 82); Liévin, France
- Political party: Socialist Party
- Profession: Teacher

Jean-Pierre Kucheida (born 24 February 1943 in Liévin) is a member of the National Assembly of France. He represents the 12th constituency of the Pas-de-Calais département, and is a member of the Socialist Party which is affiliated to the Socialiste, radical, citoyen et divers gauche parliamentary group. He is of Polish descent.
