= Jean-Marc Tellier =

French politician

Member of the National Assembly for Pas-de-Calais's 3rd constituency
- Incumbent
- Assumed office 22 June 2022
- Preceded by: Emmanuel Blairy
- Succeeded by: Bruno Clavet

Personal details
- Born: 23 August 1969 (age 57) Liévin, France
- Party: French Communist Party; NUPES

Jean-Marc Tellier (born 23 August 1969) is a French politician from the French Communist Party. He became the Member of Parliament for Pas-de-Calais's 3rd constituency in the 2022 French legislative election. He was defeated in the first round of the 2024 French legislative election by Bruno Clavet.

== Biography ==
Jean-Marc Tellier is the son of a Miner. He has been an activist in the French Communist Party since the age of 17.

In January 2009, the outgoing mayor of Avion, Jacques Robitail, announced his wish to see his first deputy, Jean-Marc Tellier, succeed him. Disagreeing with this decision, the second deputy, Cathy Apourceau-Poly, resigned along with four other members of the municipal council in February. On October 11, 2009, Jean-Marc Tellier and the "dissident" Cathy Apourceau-Poly faced off in a municipal by-election, which he won with 55.30% of the votes cast.

Elected general councilor of Pas-de-Calais in 2011, then departmental councilor for the Canton of Avion in 2015, in July 2021, he once again became vice-president of the Pas-de-Calais departmental council, responsible for integration, active solidarity income (RSA) and the housing solidarity fund (FSL), a role he had held during his previous term of office.

He is committed to defending Public service.

In June 2017, he ran for legislative elections in the Pas-de-Calais's 3rd constituency but, hampered by the candidacy of Georges Kuzmanovic, he failed to qualify for the second round by 221 votes and was eliminated with 16.39% of the votes cast (50.50% in Avion).

Following the rise in gas and electricity prices, on October 9, 2021, he signed a municipal decree prohibiting energy suppliers from cutting off power to households that are no longer paying their bills. On his initiative, the mayors of 19 other municipalities in the Arrondissement of Lens filed a similar decree with the sub-prefecture on March 31, 2022.

In May 2022, he was nominated by the French Communist Party, under the banner of the New Ecological and Social People's Union, as a candidate for the legislative elections. He was elected deputy in the second round with 50.11% of the vote, beating Bruno Clavet, the National Rally candidate, by 71 votes. He is a member of the Democratic and Republican Left group.

Running for re-election in the early legislative elections on June 30 and July 7, 2024, he was eliminated in the first round with 32.29% of the votes cast, behind the National Rally candidate,Bruno Clavet.

== See also ==
- List of deputies of the 16th National Assembly of France
