= Philippe Vasseur =

French politician (born 1943)

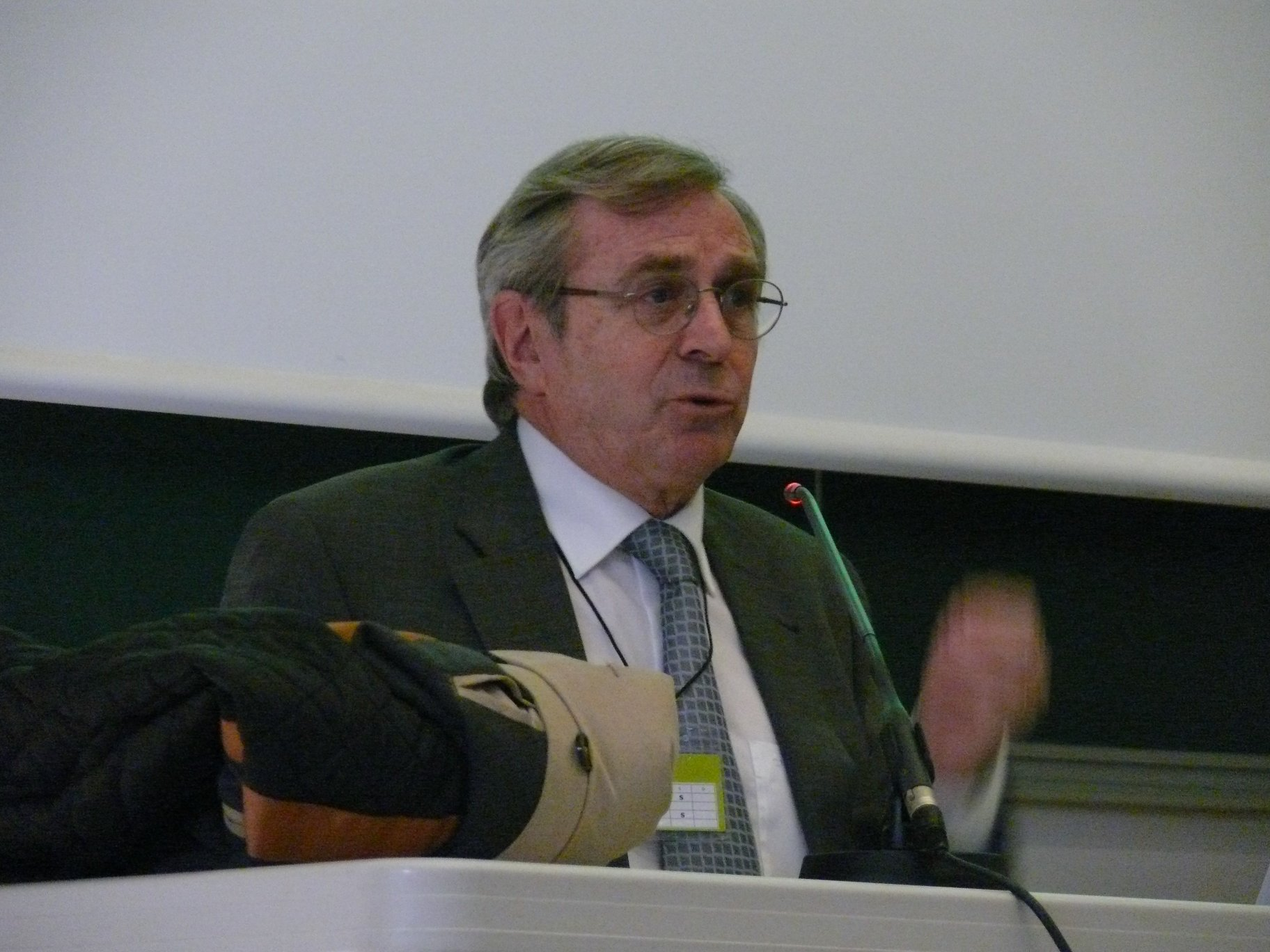
- Philippe Vasseur in 2014

Minister of Agriculture, Food and Fishing
- In office 18 May 1995 – 2 June 1997
- President: Jacques Chirac
- Prime Minister: Alain Juppé
- Preceded by: Jean Puech
- Succeeded by: Louis Le Pensec

Member of the National Assembly for Pas-de-Calais's 3rd constituency
- In office 12 June 1997 – 31 December 1999
- Preceded by: Brigitte de Prémont
- Succeeded by: Jean-Claude Leroy

Personal details
- Born: 31 August 1943 (age 83) Le Touquet-Paris-Plage, France
- Party: UDF; Liberal Democracy
- Education: École supérieure de journalisme de Lille

Philippe Vasseur (born 31 August 1943) is a French politician.

Vasseur began his career as a journalist on newspapers and TV. From 1986 to 1999, he was a French Member of Parliament, and, from 1995 to 1997, the French Minister of Agriculture.
