= Bellebrune =

Bellebrune Bellebronne
- Commune
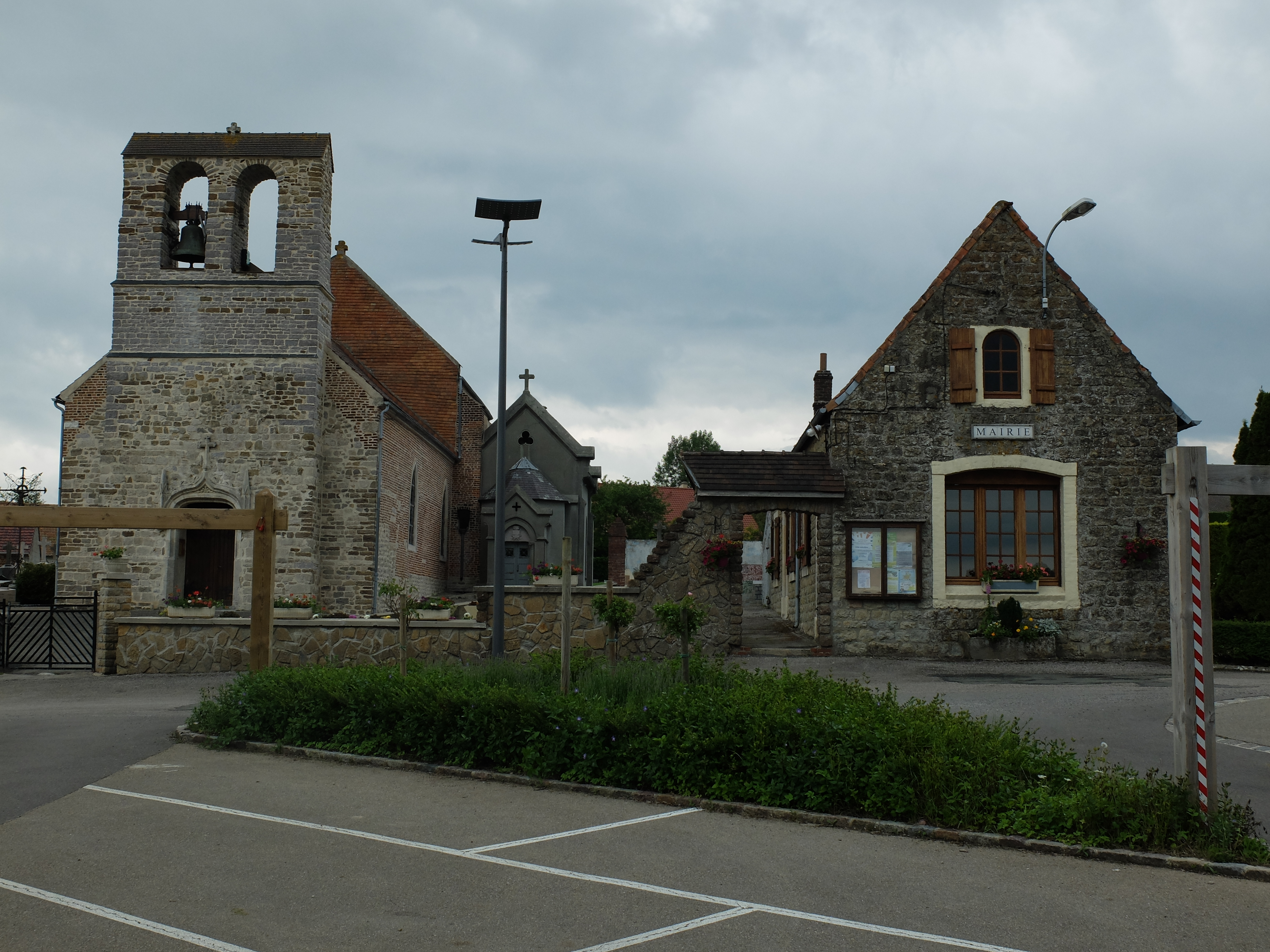
- The church and town hall of Bellebrune

- Coat of arms
- Location of Bellebrune
- Location within France Location within Hauts-de-France
- Coordinates: 50°43′40″N 1°46′31″E
- Country: France
- Region: Hauts-de-France
- Department: Pas-de-Calais
- Arrondissement: Boulogne-sur-Mer
- Canton: Desvres
- Intercommunality: CC Desvres-Samer

Government
  - Mayor (2020–2026): Christophe Guche
- Area^{1}: 5.32 km^{2} (2.05 sq mi)
- Elevation: 86 m (282 ft)
- Highest elevation: 105 m (344 ft)
- Lowest elevation: 38 m (125 ft)
- Population (2023): 427
  - Density: 80.3/km^{2} (208/sq mi)
- Time zone: UTC+01:00 (CET)
  - Summer (DST): UTC+02:00 (CEST)
- INSEE/Postal code: 62104 /62142
- ^{1} French Land Register data, which excludes lakes, ponds, glaciers > 1 km^{2} (0.386 sq mi or 247 acres) and river estuaries.

Bellebrune (French pronunciation: [bɛlbʁyn]; West Flemish: Bellebronne) is a commune in the Pas-de-Calais department in the Hauts-de-France region in northern France.

== Geography ==
A small farming commune, some 8 miles (13 km) northeast of Boulogne, at the junction of the N42, D252 and the D238 roads.

== Population ==
Historical population
Year	Pop.	±% p.a.
1968	150	—
1975	158	+0.75%
1982	171	+1.14%
1990	179	+0.57%
1999	246	+3.60%
2007	332	+3.82%
2012	353	+1.23%
2017	400	+2.53%
2023	427	+1.09%
Source: INSEE

== Sights ==
- The ruins of an 11th-century castle.
- The church of St. Leu, dating from the fifteenth century.
- The Château de La Villeneuve, dating from the seventeenth century.

== See also ==
- Communes of the Pas-de-Calais department
