= Canton of Lens-Nord-Ouest =

Coordinates: 50°26′41″N 2°48′47″E

Lens-Nord-Ouest
- Former canton
- Interactive map of Lens-Nord-Ouest
- Country: France
- Region: Hauts-de-France
- Department: Pas-de-Calais
- No. of communes: {{{nbcomm}}}
- Disbanded: 2015
- Population (2012): 16,928

The canton of Lens-Nord-Ouest is a former canton situated in the department of the Pas-de-Calais and in the Nord-Pas-de-Calais region of northern France. It was disbanded following the French canton reorganisation which came into effect in March 2015. It had a total of 16,928 inhabitants (2012).

== Geography ==
The canton is organised around Lens in the arrondissement of Lens. The altitude varies from 27m (Lens) to 74m (Loos-en-Gohelle) for an average altitude of 33m.

The canton comprised 2 communes:

- Loos-en-Gohelle
- Lens (partly)

== See also ==
- Cantons of Pas-de-Calais
- Communes of Pas-de-Calais
- Arrondissements of the Pas-de-Calais department
