= Christopher Szczurek =

French politician (born 1985)

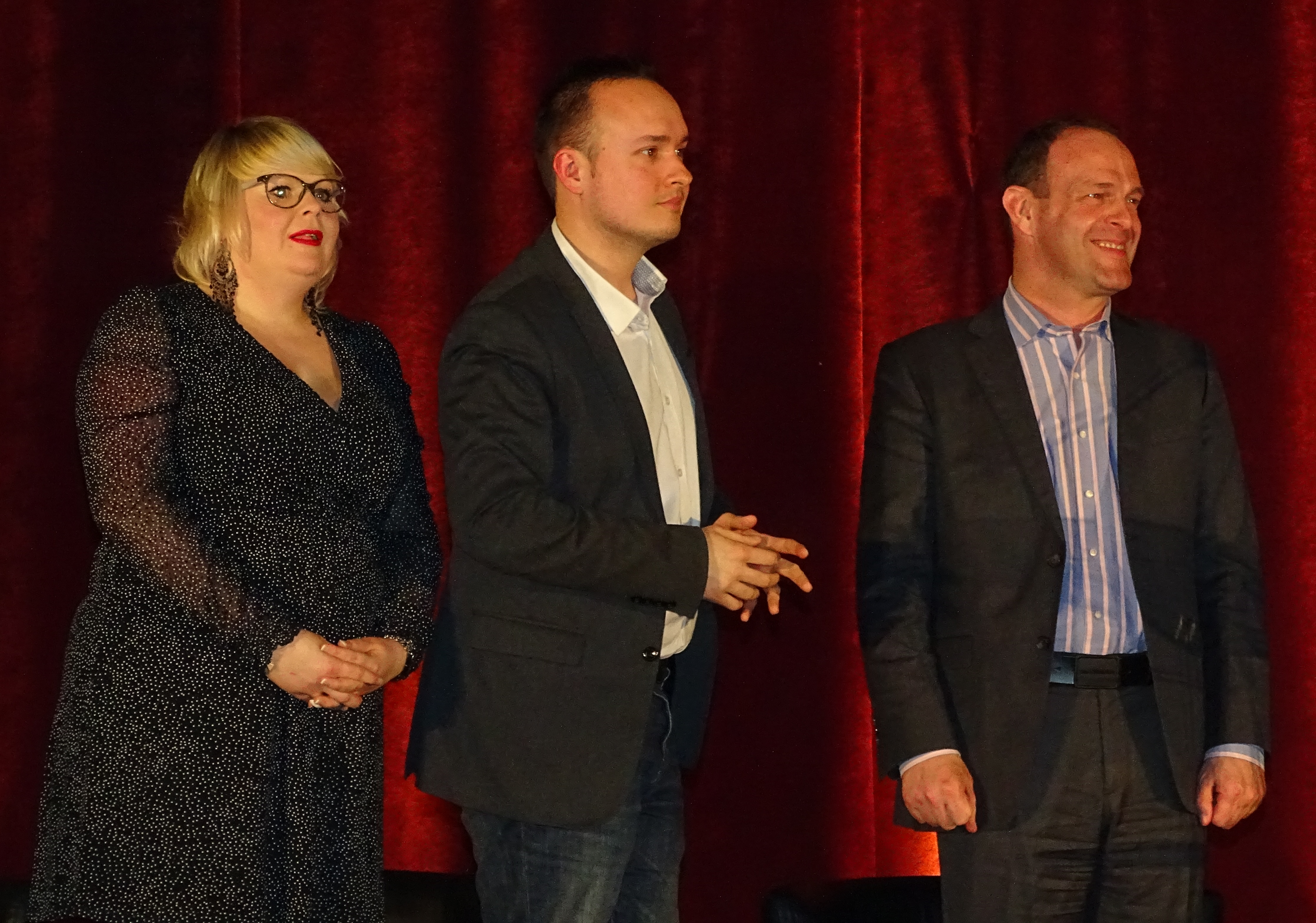
- Szczurek in 2015

Member of the Senate
- Incumbent
- Assumed office 2 October 2023
- Constituency: Pas-de-Calais

Personal details
- Born: 11 June 1985 (age 40)
- Party: National Rally (since 2007)

Christopher Szczurek (born 11 June 1985) is a French politician of the National Rally. Since 2023, he has been a member of the Senate. He was a member of the Departmental Council of Pas-de-Calais from 2015 to 2021, and a member of the Regional Council of Hauts-de-France from 2021 to 2023. From 2020 to 2023, he served as deputy mayor of Hénin-Beaumont under Steeve Briois.
