= Jean Puech =

French politician (1942–2026)

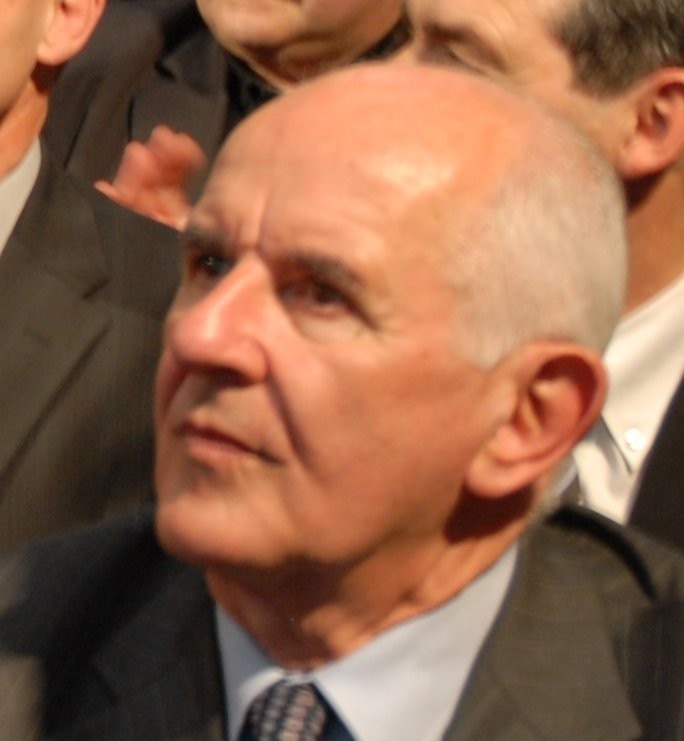
- Puech in 2007

Minister of Civil Service
- In office 1995–1997
- President: Jacques Chirac
- Prime Minister: Alain Juppé
- Preceded by: André Rossinot
- Succeeded by: Dominique Perben

Minister of Agriculture and Fisheries
- In office 1993–1995
- President: François Mitterrand
- Prime Minister: Édouard Balladur
- Preceded by: Jean-Pierre Soisson
- Succeeded by: Philippe Vasseur

Personal details
- Born: 22 February 1942 Viviez, Aveyron, France
- Died: 12 November 2026 (aged 84)
- Party: UMP

Jean Puech (22 February 1942 – 12 November 2026) was a French politician. He was first a member of the Republican Party before joining the Union for a Popular Movement.

Between 1980 and 1993 and again between 1996 and 2008, he was a Senator. Between 1993 and 1995, he was Minister of Agriculture. Then in 1995 for a few months, he was Minister of the Civil service.

Puech died on 12 November 2026, at the age of 84.

== Sources ==
- "Senate profile".
