= 7 Valleys Pas-de-Calais =

The 7 Valleys (Les 7 Vallées) in Pas-de-Calais is a land of rivers and streams, valleys, forests. The best known of the Seven Valleys, is the Valley of the Canche. The river Canche has its headwaters near Magnicourt sur Canche. The Ternoise and Course flow into it along its 96 kilometre winding journey to its vast estuary in the Channel just north of Le Touquet at Etaples sur Mer and many restaurants and auberges are to be found along the way, especially between Montreuil and Etaples. The river is populated with rainbow trout, sea trout, eel, pike and roach and although you can walk along both banks, the right hand side is more picturesque. The river follows the lie of the land flowing past chalk hillsides and its path is frequently indicated by the presence of willows. The farms, set low down, are often built of whitewashed cob.

== Overview ==
In the course of history, the 7 Valleys is said to have been owned by the English, the Spanish and finally the French.

Depicted by The Sunday Times, UK, as Northern France's best kept secret, the Seven Valleys is also called the Artois Valleys abounding in “rolling contours, as green and bushy as anything you will come across in Dordogne”. Other notable places, a midst beautiful villages and rolling fields, include the Opal Coast and the historic battlefields of Azincourt and Crecy. The place boasts of a splendid getaway for visitors to get an insight into the serene lifestyle of the French people and the local history of the place.

Boasting a number of rivers, both calm and wild, rivers like the Canche and the Authie (river) are home to river otters.

The historical site of the Battle of Agincourt, where the French Cavalry had to see a heavy defeat in 1415 at the hands of the British, holds a modern interactive museum. Every year an archery competition is held at this battle site. Access to this historical place is easy via Channel Ports and on the Boulogne to Arras railway line. For accommodation, the place offers from a luxury chateau, gites to basic hotels, farm B&B and camping facilities. Restaurants are in plenty and the visitors can spend their time, hiking, cycling, horse riding, fishing, water surfing or simply visiting the countryside or the historical sites.
