= Pas-de-Calais's 12th constituency =

Constituency of the National Assembly of France

12th constituency of the Pas-de-Calais
- inline Constituency of the National Assembly of France

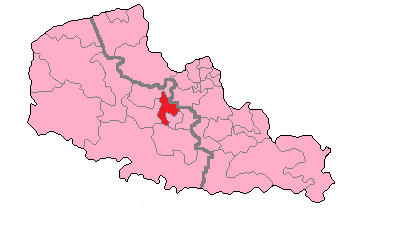
- Pas-de-Calais' 12th constituency shown within Nord-Pas-de-Calais
- Deputy: Bruno Bilde; RN
- Department: Pas-de-Calais
- Cantons: Bully-les-Mines, Cambrin, Douvrin, Liévin-Nord, Liévin-Sud, Wingles
- Registered voters: 94,598

The 12th constituency of the Pas-de-Calais is a French legislative constituency in the Pas-de-Calais département.

== Description ==
Pas-de-Calais' 12th constituency lies in the centre of the department around the mining city of Liévin.

Until 2017, the seat was strongly left leaning resulting in unbroken Socialist Party control from 1988.

== Historic Representation ==
Election	Member	Party
1986	Proportional representation - no election by constituency	
1988	Jean-Pierre Kucheida	PS
1993	Jean-Pierre Kucheida	PS
1997	Jean-Pierre Kucheida	PS
2002	Jean-Pierre Kucheida	PS
2007	Jean-Pierre Kucheida	PS
2012	Nicolas Bays	PS
2017	Bruno Bilde	FN
2022	Bruno Bilde	RN
2024	Bruno Bilde	RN

== Election results ==
=== 2024 ===
Candidate	Party	Alliance	First round			Second round		
Candidate	Party	Alliance	Votes	%	+/–	Votes	%	+/–
Bruno Bilde	RN		33,944	59.24	+17.42			
Alain Bavay	PS	NFP	12,059	21.04	-8.43			
Steve Bossart	DVC		10,178	17.76	new			
Régis Scheenaerts	LO		1,121	1.96	+0.32			
Votes			57,302	100.00				
Valid votes			57,302	96.40	-0.45			
Blank votes			1,476	2.48	+0.36			
Null votes			661	1.11	+0.08			
Turnout			59,439	61.41	+18.91			
Abstentions			37,350	38.59	-18.91			
Registered voters			96,789					
Result			RN HOLD					

=== 2022 ===
Legislative Election 2022: Pas-de-Calais's 12th constituency
Party	Candidate	Votes	%	±%
RN	Bruno Bilde	16,609	35.61	+6.29
PS (NUPÉS)	Jérôme Darras	11,703	29.47	-2.79
MoDem (Ensemble)	Patrick Debruyne	5,927	14.92	−5.92
DVG	Alain De Carrion	1,774	4.47	N/A
REC	Emmanuelle Danjou	1,076	2.71	N/A
Others	N/A	2,626	6.61	
Turnout		39,715	42.50	−3.67
2nd round result
RN	Bruno Bilde	20,855	56.30	+1.22
PS (NUPÉS)	Jérôme Darras	16,190	43.70	N/A
Turnout		37,045	41.76	−0.02
RN hold				

=== 2017 ===
Candidate	Label	First round		Second round	
Candidate	Label	Votes	%	Votes	%
Bruno Bilde	FN	15,115	35.53	20,057	55.08
Coralie Rembert	REM	8,863	20.84	16,360	44.92
Laurent Duporge	PS	6,829	16.05		
Grégory Frackowiak	FI	5,120	12.04		
Caroline Meloni	LR	1,781	4.19		
Christian Champire	PCF	1,774	4.17		
Daniel Ludwikowski	ECO	992	2.33		
Régis Scheenaerts	EXG	616	1.45		
Jean-Michel Andreau	DLF	525	1.23		
Frédéric Lamand	DVD	443	1.04		
Christiane Bouriez	ECO	215	0.51		
Henri Condette	DIV	197	0.46		
Alexandre Ruiz	DVG	68	0.16		
Votes		42,538	100.00	36,417	100.00
Valid votes		42,538	96.88	36,417	91.63
Blank votes		806	1.84	2,146	5.40
Null votes		565	1.29	1,179	2.97
Turnout		43,909	46.17	39,742	41.78
Abstentions		51,200	53.83	55,382	58.22
Registered voters		95,109		95,124	
Source: Ministry of the Interior

=== 2012 ===
2012 legislative election in Pas-De-Calais's 12th constituency
Candidate	Party	First round		Second round	
Candidate	Party	Votes	%	Votes	%
Charlotte Soula	FN	12,839	25.69%	19,905	43.16%
Nicolas Bays	PS–PRG	12,296	24.61%	26,216	56.84%
Jean-Pierre Kucheida	PS dissident	10,811	21.64%		
Frédéric Lamand	UMP	6,099	12.21%		
Christian Champire	FG	4,595	9.20%		
Hervé Rubin	EELV–MEI	756	1.51%		
Régis Scheenaerts	LO	713	1.43%		
Michel Richet	LT	580	1.16%		
Anne Delpech	MoDem	572	1.14%		
Jacques Kleinpeter	NPA	263	0.53%		
Laëtitia Matiatos	NC	199	0.40%		
Habiba Chouaf	AEI	146	0.29%		
Charlotte Albrun	COC62 (POC)	99	0.20%		
Valid votes		49,968	97.36%	46,121	93.32%
Spoilt and null votes		1,353	2.64%	3,303	6.68%
Votes cast / turnout		51,321	54.25%	49,423	52.25%
Abstentions		43,276	45.75%	45,175	47.75%
Registered voters		94,597	100.00%	94,598	100.00%

=== 2007 ===
Legislative Election 2007: Pas-de-Calais's 12th constituency
Party	Candidate	Votes	%	±%
PS	Jean-Pierre Kucheida	19,706	45.61	
UMP	Jeanine Duquesne	8,396	19.43	
PCF	Cathy Poly Apourceau	4,101	9.49	
FN	Louis Lecoeuvre	3,351	7.76	
MoDem	Anne Revel-Delpech	2,118	4.90	
Far left	Frédéric Fraccola	1,372	3.18	
Far left	Nathalie Hubert	981	2.27	
LV	Ludovic Moronval	974	2.25	
Others	N/A	2,207		
Turnout		44,506	56.35	
2nd round result
PS	Jean-Pierre Kucheida	27,866	69.69	
UMP	Jeanine Duquesne	12,118	30.31	
Turnout		42,108	53.32	
PS hold				

=== 2002 ===
Legislative Election 2002: Pas-de-Calais's 12th constituency
Party	Candidate	Votes	%	±%
PS	Jean-Pierre Kucheida	19,294	43.71	
FN	Louis Lecoeuvre	7,085	16.05	
UMP	Jeanine Duquesne	5,556	12.59	
PCF	Cathy Apourceau	4,554	10.32	
PR	Bernard Urbaniak	1,878	4.25	
LO	Nathalie Hubert	1,289	2.93	
LV	Daniel Ludwikowski	1,207	2.73	
Others	N/A	3,282		
Turnout		45,730	58.88	
2nd round result
PS	Jean-Pierre Kucheida	28,147	74.08	
FN	Louis Lecoeuvre	9,847	25.92	
Turnout		41,573	53.53	
PS hold				

=== 1997 ===
Legislative Election 1997: Pas-de-Calais's 12th constituency
Party	Candidate	Votes	%	±%
PS	Jean-Pierre Kucheida	18,185	35.26	
PCF	Jacques Robitail*	14,341	27.81	
FN	Patrick Ratcliffe	7,727	14.98	
RPR	Bernard Pukiel	4,512	8.75	
LO	Nathalie Hubert	2,316	4.49	
LV	Jérôme Przystupa	2,055	3.98	
MEI	Henri Bailleul	1,486	2.88	
Others	N/A	954		
Turnout		54,408	71.88	
2nd round result
PS	Jean-Pierre Kucheida	29,735	100.00	
Turnout		42,363	55.97	
PS hold				

* Withdrew before the 2nd round

== Sources ==
- Official results of French elections from 1998: "Résultats électoraux officiels en France" (in French).
