= Wavrans-sur-l'Aa =

Wavrans-sur-l’Aa Waverant
- Commune
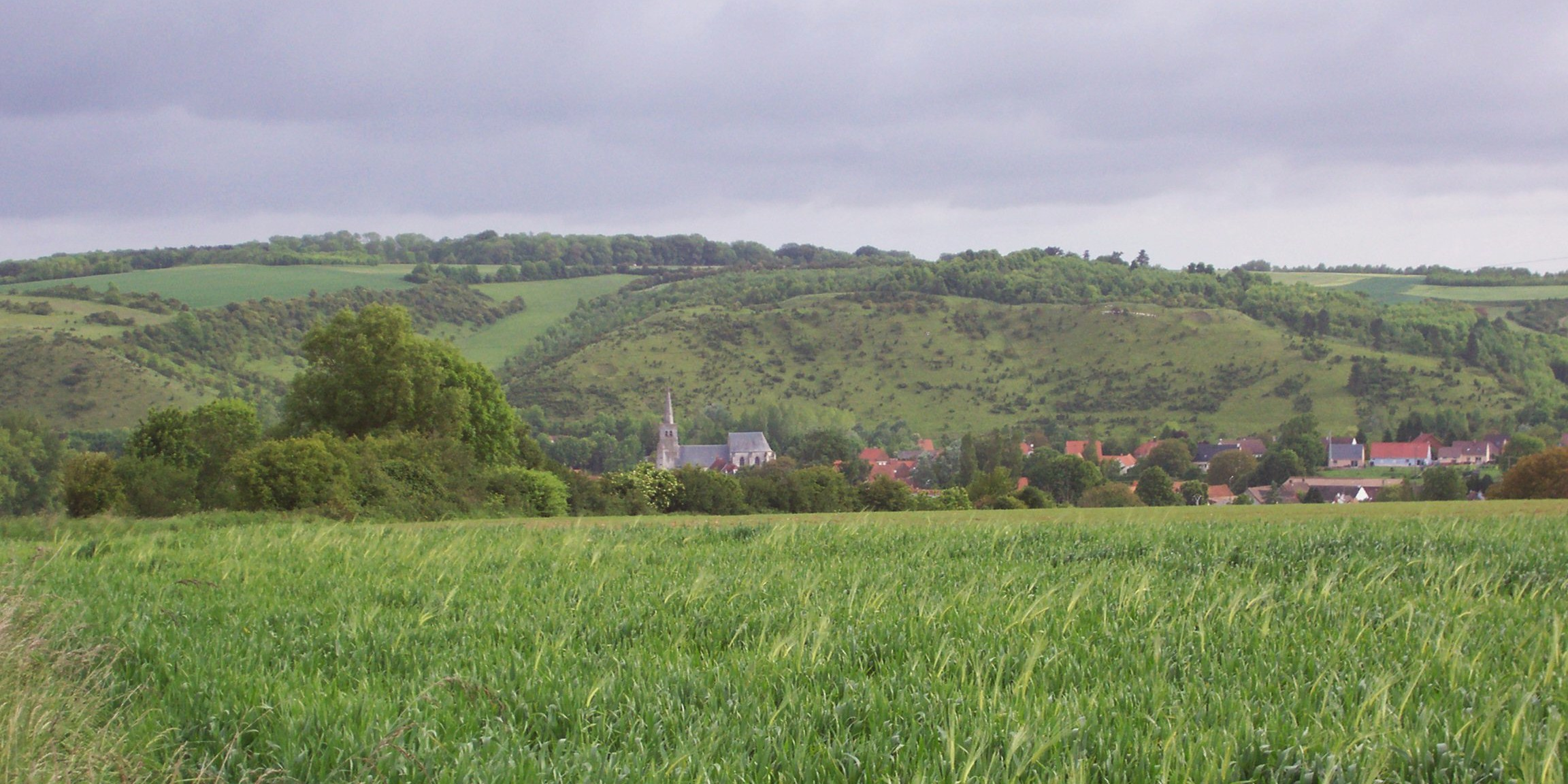
- A general view of Wavrans-sur-l'Aa

- Coat of arms
- Location of Wavrans-sur-l’Aa
- Location within France Location within Hauts-de-France
- Coordinates: 50°41′01″N 2°08′15″E
- Country: France
- Region: Hauts-de-France
- Department: Pas-de-Calais
- Arrondissement: Saint-Omer
- Canton: Lumbres
- Intercommunality: Pays de Lumbres

Government
  - Mayor (2020–2026): Julien Delannoy
- Area^{1}: 11.48 km^{2} (4.43 sq mi)
- Elevation: 73 m (240 ft)
- Highest elevation: 141 m (463 ft)
- Lowest elevation: 43 m (141 ft)
- Population (2023): 1,203
  - Density: 104.8/km^{2} (271.4/sq mi)
- Time zone: UTC+01:00 (CET)
  - Summer (DST): UTC+02:00 (CEST)
- INSEE/Postal code: 62882 /62380
- ^{1} French Land Register data, which excludes lakes, ponds, glaciers > 1 km^{2} (0.386 sq mi or 247 acres) and river estuaries.

Wavrans-sur-l’Aa (French pronunciation: [wavʁɑ̃ syʁ la], literally Wavrans on the Aa; West Flemish: Waverant) is a commune in the Pas-de-Calais department in the Hauts-de-France region of France.

== Geography ==
Wavrans-sur-l'Aa is located 13 kilometres (8.1 mi) southwest of Saint-Omer, at the D192 and D225 road junction, on the banks of the river Aa. It is home to a site of great ecological interest, which justified the creation of a voluntary nature reserve, which become the Grottes et Pelouses d'Acquin-Westbecourt et Coteaux de Wavrans-sur-l'Aa National Nature Reserve in 2008

== Population ==
Historical population
Year	Pop.	±% p.a.
1968	897	—
1975	938	+0.64%
1982	1,035	+1.42%
1990	1,196	+1.82%
1999	1,225	+0.27%
2007	1,307	+0.81%
2012	1,314	+0.11%
2017	1,270	−0.68%
2023	1,203	−0.90%
Source: INSEE

== Transport ==
The Chemin de fer d'Anvin à Calais opened a railway station at Wavrans-sur-l'Aa in 1881. The railway was closed in 1955.

== See also ==
- Communes of the Pas-de-Calais department
