= Emmanuel Blairy =

French politician (born 1986)

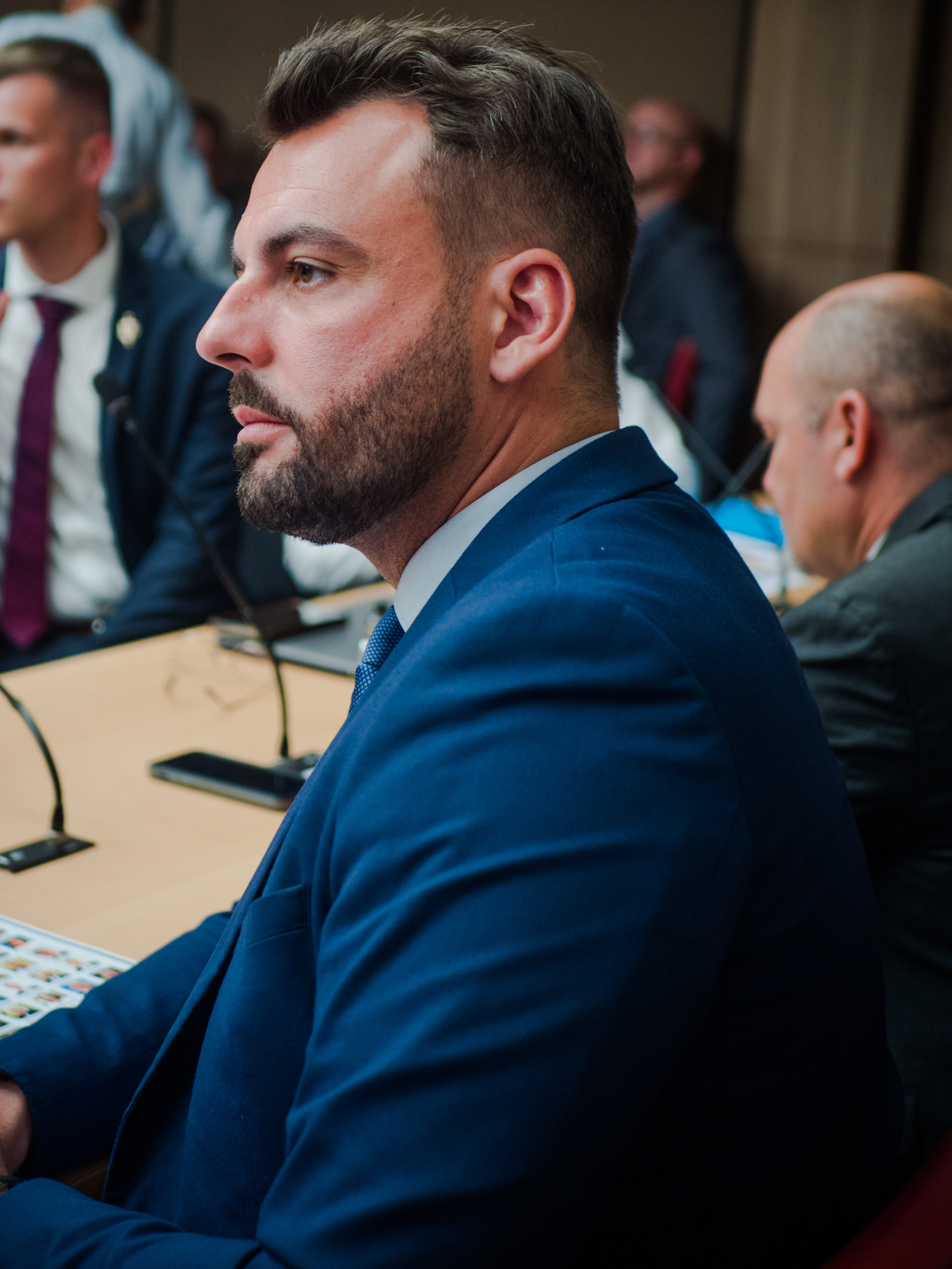

Member of the National Assembly for Pas-de-Calais's 3rd constituency
- In office 7 January 2022 – 21 June 2022
- Preceded by: José Évrard
- Succeeded by: Jean-Marc Tellier

Member of the National Assembly for Pas-de-Calais's 1st constituency
- Incumbent
- Assumed office 22 June 2022
- Preceded by: Bruno Duvergé

Personal details
- Born: 13 March 1986 (age 40) Lens, France
- Party: National Rally

Emmanuel Blairy, born 14 March 1986 in Lens (Pas-de-Calais), is a French politician, deputy in the National Assembly from January 2022 and a local civil servant of the Communauté d'agglomération de Lens – Liévin since 2006.

He was born and raised in Lens. His parents worked for the city and his uncle, Louis Blairy, was municipal councilor of Lens.

He is a member of the National Rally.

In June 2017, he was the substitute to the deputy José Évrard elected in the Pas-de-Calais's 3rd constituency. He succeeded him as deputy for the third constituency on 7 January 2022, following Évrard's death. Since at the time the National Rally had not enough deputies to constitute a parliamentary group, he sat in the National Assembly among the non-registered.

In the 2022 French legislative election, he won Pas-de-Calais's 1st constituency, as a member of National Rally.
