= Pas-de-Calais's 13th constituency =

Former legislative constituency in Pas-de-Calais

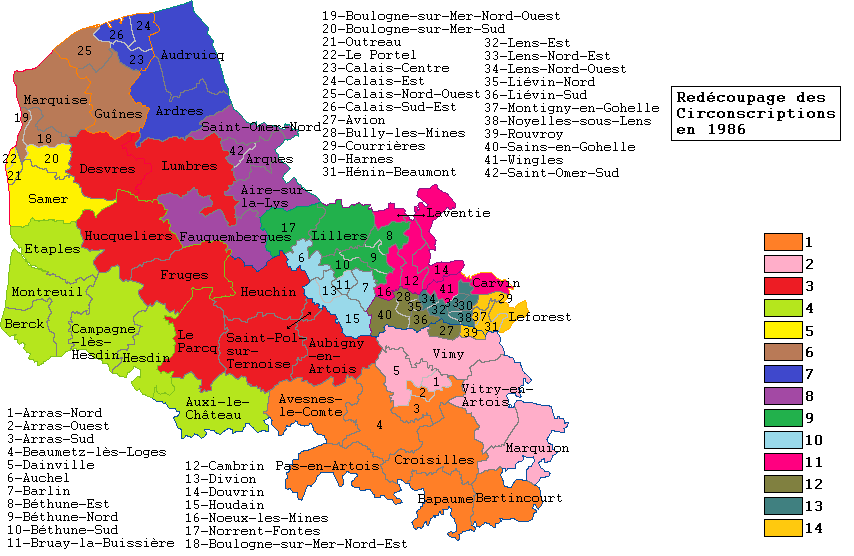
Constituencies of Pas-de-Calais in 1986.

The 13th constituency of the Pas-de-Calais was a French legislative constituency which existed until 2012. It was one of 14 French legislative constituencies in the Pas-de-Calais department (62) located in the Nord-Pas-de-Calais region.

== Geographic and demographic description ==
The department of Pas-de-Calais had fourteen constituencies. The thirteenth constituency of Pas-de-Calais was made up of:

- town of Billy-Montigny
- Commune of Fouquières-lès-Lens
- town of Lens
- Municipality of Loison-sous-Lens
- town of Noyelles-sous-Lens
- town of Sallaumines

Source: Official Journal of October 14–15, 1958.

=== Since 1998 ===
The thirteenth constituency of Pas-de-Calais was delimited as an electoral division by law n°86-1197 of the November 24, 1986. It includes the following administrative divisions : Cantons of Harnes, Lens Est, Lens Nord-Est, Lens Nord-Ouest.

According to the general census of the population in 1999, carried out by the Institut national de la statistique et des études économiques (INSEE), the population of this district was estimated at 105,072 inhabitants.

== Election results ==
=== 2007 ===
Legislative Election 2007: Pas-de-Calais 13th - 2nd round
Party	Candidate	Votes	%	±%
PS	Guy Delcourt	21,736	59.21	
UMP	Béatrice Permuy	14,975	40.79	
Turnout		38,811	53.61	
PS hold		Swing		

== Sources ==
- Official results of French elections from 1998: "Résultats électoraux officiels en France" (in French).
