= Joshua Hochart =

French politician (born 1987)

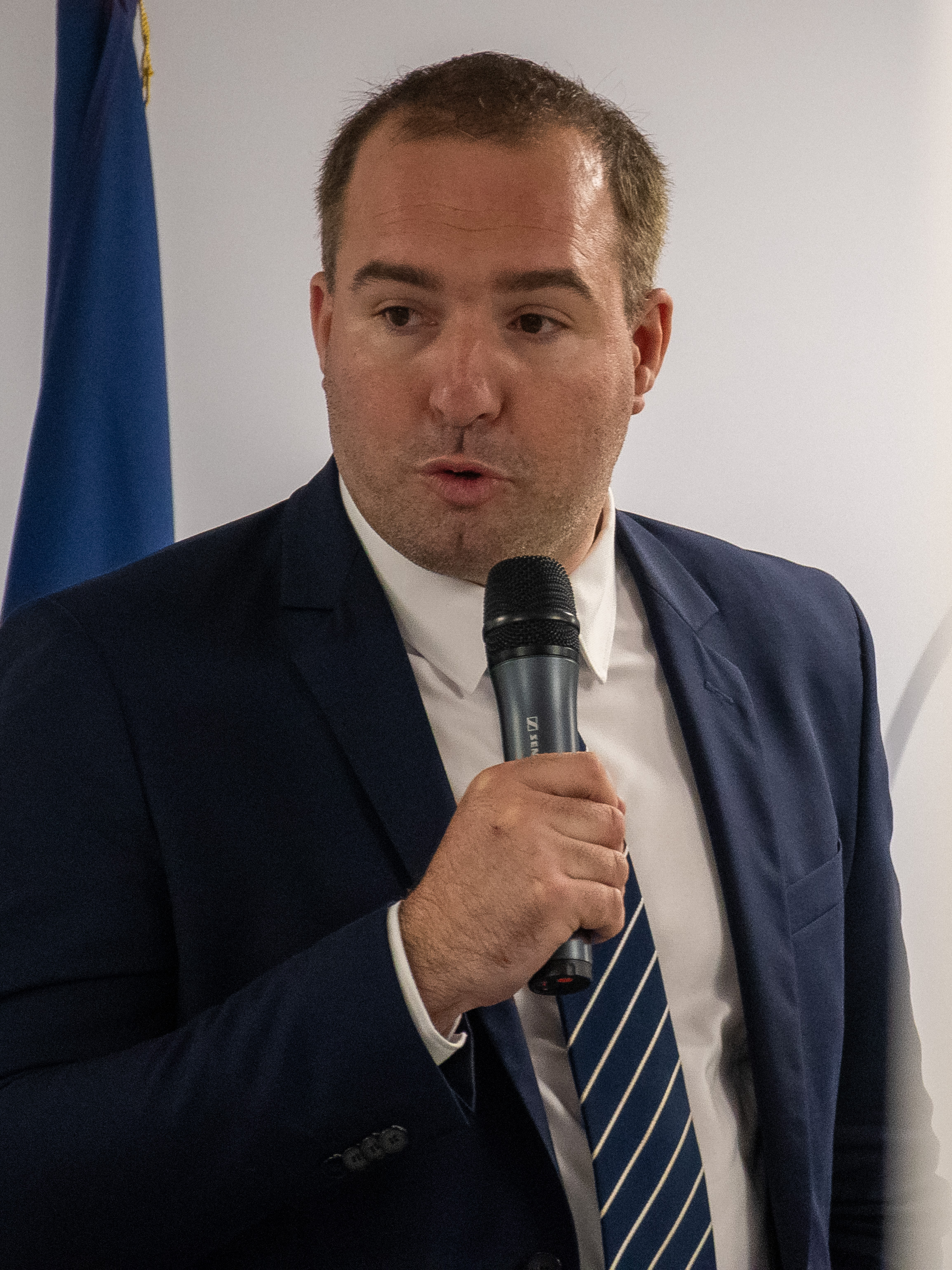
- Hochart in 2023

Member of the Senate
- Incumbent
- Assumed office 2 October 2023
- Constituency: Nord

Personal details
- Born: 25 August 1987 (age 38)
- Party: National Rally

Joshua Hochart (born 25 August 1987) is a French politician of the National Rally. Since 2023, he has been a member of the Senate. He was elected municipal councillor of Denain in the 2020 municipal elections, and was the campaign director of the National Rally in Hauts-de-France in the 2021 regional elections. In the 2024 legislative election, he was the campaign director of the National Rally in Nord.

== Biography ==
Joshua Hochart was born in Denain. He grew up in several neighborhoods of the city: the Duchateau suburb, the Werth housing project, the city center, and Bellevue. He studied at Alfred-Kastler High School, where he obtained a high school diploma in industrial science and technology (STI). He then became a recreation center counselor in Denain and a stretcher bearer at the hospital.

He then worked as a deputy police officer in the Nord departmental public security directorate, which he left to work as a trainer in various organizations, notably in civil protection, where he had been a volunteer since the age of 15. It was during a general meeting of this association at the end of 2018 that he met Sébastien Chenu.

He offered him a place on his list for the 2020 municipal elections. Joshua Hochart was thus elected municipal councilor for Denain—where he chairs the opposition group of the National Rally(RN)—as well as councilor for the Porte du Hainaut urban community (CAPH).

In 2021, he led Sébastien Chenu's campaign in the regional elections. The list won 23.8% of the vote, almost half as much as the 43.63% won by the FN in 2015. He attracted attention for his expenses in an investigation by the newspaper Le Monde: a net salary of €3,000, a telephone, a car with driver, and an end-of-contract bonus of just over €3,000, while his deputy Jean-Philippe Tanguy was a volunteer.

Supported by Sébastien Chenu, he ran in the 2021 departmental elections in the canton of Denain, but was unsuccessful. He was then appointed secretary general of the RN group in the Regional Council of Hauts-de-France.

Joshua Hochart was elected senator for the Nord (French department) on September 24, 2023.
