= Bruno Bilde =

French politician

Member of the National Assembly for Pas-de-Calais's 12th constituency
- Incumbent
- Assumed office 21 June 2017
- Preceded by: Nicolas Bays

Personal details
- Born: 22 September 1976 (age 50) Nancy, France
- Party: National Rally
- Spouse: Steeve Briois
- Parent: Dominique Bilde (mother)
- Education: Artois University

Bruno Bilde (born 22 September 1976) is a French politician serving as the member of the National Assembly for the 12th constituency of Pas-de-Calais since 2017. He is a member of the National Rally (RN).

== Career ==
Bilde served as a regional councillor of Lorraine (2004–2010), Nord-Pas-de-Calais (2010–2015) and Hauts-de-France (2016–2017). He was one of the five openly LGBT members of the National Assembly elected during the 2017 legislative election.

He is in a relationship with fellow National Rally politician Steeve Briois.
