= Bruno Clavet =

French politician (born 1989)

Member of the French National Assembly for Pas-de-Calais's 3rd constituency
- Incumbent
- Assumed office 18 July 2024
- Preceded by: Jean-Marc Tellier

Personal details
- Born: 6 May 1989 (age 36)
- Party: National Rally

Bruno Clavet (born 6 May 1989) is a French politician of the National Rally. He was elected member of the National Assembly for Pas-de-Calais's 3rd constituency in the 2024 election.

== Early life and career ==
Clavet became involved in politics in 2007. In 2009, he appeared on X Factor. He began working as a model in 2012. In the 2014 Paris municipal election, he was the National Rally's lead candidate in the 3rd arrondissement. He was a candidate for Pas-de-Calais's 3rd constituency in 2022, losing to Jean-Marc Tellier in the second round.
