= Departmental Council of Pas-de-Calais =

Deliberative assembly in Pas-de-Calais, France

The Departmental Council of Pas-de-Calais is the deliberative assembly of the French department of Pas-de-Calais.

== Presidents ==
- Jean-Claude Leroy
