= Pas-de-Calais =

Department of France

Pas-de-Calais Pas-Calés
- Department
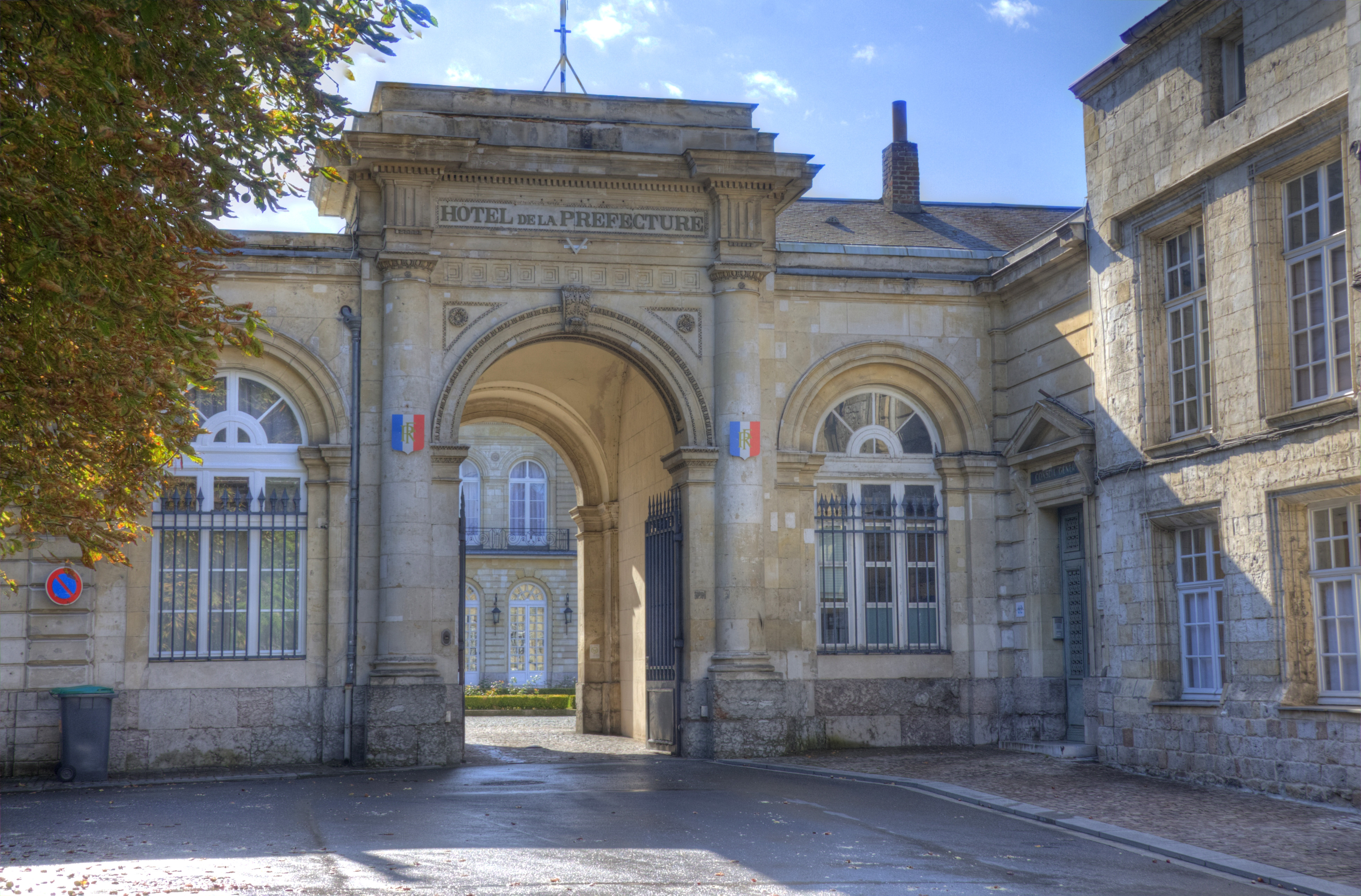
- Prefecture building of the department, in Arras

- Flag Coat of arms

- Location of Pas-de-Calais in France
- Coordinates: 50°57′N 1°51′E
- Country: France
- Region: Hauts-de-France
- Prefecture: Arras
- Subprefectures: Béthune, Boulogne-sur-Mer, Calais, Lens, Montreuil, Saint-Omer

Government
  - Body: Departmental Council of Pas-de-Calais
  - President of the Departmental Council: Jean-Claude Leroy

Area^{1}
  - Total: 6,706 km^{2} (2,589 sq mi)

Population (2023)
  - Total: 1,457,905
  - Rank: 7th
  - Density: 217.4/km^{2} (563.1/sq mi)
- Time zone: UTC+1 (CET)
  - Summer (DST): UTC+2 (CEST)
- ISO 3166 code: FR-62
- Department number: 62
- Arrondissements: 7
- Cantons: 39
- Communes: 887
- ^1 French Land Register data, which exclude estuaries, and lakes, ponds, and glaciers larger than 1 km^{2}

The Pas-de-Calais (French: [pɑ d(ə) kalɛ]) is a department in northern France named after the French designation of the Strait of Dover, which it borders. It has the most communes of all the departments of France, with 887, and is the 8th most populous. It had a population of 1,457,905 in 2023. The Calais Passage connects to the Port of Calais on the English Channel. The Pas-de-Calais borders the departments of Nord and Somme and is connected to the English county of Kent via the Channel Tunnel.

== History ==
Inhabited since prehistoric times, the Pas-de-Calais region was populated in turn by the Celtic Belgae, the Romans, the Germanic Franks and the Alemanni. During the fourth and fifth centuries, the Roman practice of co-opting Germanic tribes to provide military and defence services along the route from Boulogne-sur-Mer to Cologne created a Germanic-Romance linguistic border in the region that persisted until the eighth century.

Saxon colonization into the region from the fifth to the eighth centuries likely extended the linguistic border somewhat south and west so that by the ninth century most inhabitants north of the line between Béthune and Berck spoke a dialect of Middle Dutch, while the inhabitants to the south spoke Picard, a variety of Romance dialects.

This linguistic border is still evident today in the toponyms and patronyms of the region. Beginning in the ninth century, the linguistic border began a steady move to north and the east.

Pas-de-Calais is one of the original 83 departments created during the French Revolution on 4 March 1790. It was created from parts of the former provinces of Calaisis, formerly English, Boulonnais, Ponthieu and Artois, this last formerly part of the Spanish Netherlands.

Some of the costliest battles of World War I were fought in the region. The Canadian National Vimy Memorial, eight kilometres (five miles) from Arras, commemorates the Battle of Vimy Ridge assault during the Battle of Arras (1917) and is Canada's most important memorial in Europe to its fallen soldiers.

Pas-de-Calais was also the target of Operation Fortitude during World War II, which was an Allied plan to deceive the Germans that the invasion of Europe at D-Day was to occur here, rather than in Normandy.

== Geography ==
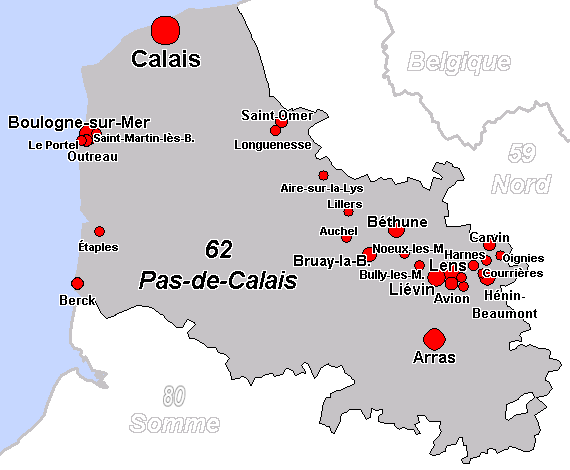
Cities > 10,000 inhabitants

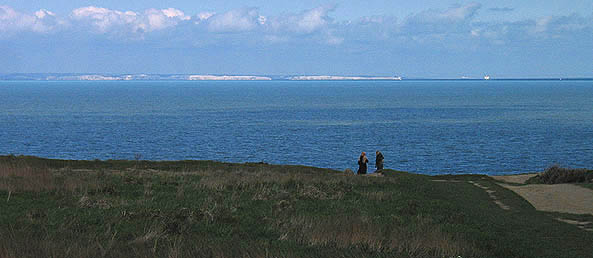
View of the English coast, from Pas-de-Calais

Pas-de-Calais is in the current region of Hauts-de-France and is surrounded by the departments of Nord and Somme, the English Channel, and the North Sea. It shares a maritime border with the English county of Kent in the United Kingdom halfway through the Channel Tunnel.

The principal rivers are the following:

- Authie
- Canche
- Ternoise
- Liane
- Sensée
- Scarpe
- Deûle
- Lys
- Aa

=== Principal towns ===
Its principal towns are, on the coast, Calais and Boulogne-sur-Mer, and in Artois, Arras, Lens, Liévin, and Béthune. The most populous commune is Calais; the prefecture Arras is the second-most populous. As of 2023, there are 10 communes with more than 15,000 inhabitants:

Commune	Population (2023)
Calais	67,571
Arras	42,875
Boulogne-sur-Mer	40,539
Lens	32,920
Liévin	30,063
Hénin-Beaumont	25,688
Béthune	25,224
Bruay-la-Buissière	21,424
Carvin	17,909
Avion	17,435

== Economy ==
The economy of the department was long dependent on mining, primarily the coal mines near the town of Lens, Pas-de-Calais where coal was discovered in 1849. However, since World War II, the economy has become more diversified.

== Demographics ==
The inhabitants of the department are called Pas-de-Calaisiens.

Pas-de-Calais is one of the most densely populated departments of France, but has no cities with over 100,000 residents: Calais has about 68,000 inhabitants. The remaining population is primarily concentrated along the border with the department of Nord in the mining district, where a string of small towns constitutes an urban area with a population of about 1.2 million. The centre and south of the department are more rural, but still quite heavily populated, with many villages and small towns.

Although the department saw some of the heaviest fighting of World War I, its population rebounded quickly after both world wars. However, many of the mining towns have seen dramatic decreases in population, some up to half of their population.

Population development since 1801:

Historical population

Year	Pop.	±% p.a.
1801	534,416	—
1821	626,571	+0.80%
1831	655,215	+0.45%
1841	685,021	+0.45%
1851	692,994	+0.12%
1861	724,338	+0.44%
1872	761,158	+0.45%
1881	819,022	+0.82%
1891	874,364	+0.66%
1901	955,391	+0.89%
1911	1,068,155	+1.12%
1921	989,967	−0.76%
1931	1,205,191	+1.99%

Year	Pop.	±% p.a.
1936	1,179,467	−0.43%
1946	1,168,545	−0.09%
1954	1,276,833	+1.11%
1962	1,366,282	+0.85%
1968	1,397,099	+0.37%
1975	1,402,295	+0.05%
1982	1,412,413	+0.10%
1990	1,433,203	+0.18%
1999	1,441,568	+0.06%
2007	1,456,726	+0.13%
2012	1,463,628	+0.09%
2017	1,468,018	+0.06%
2023	1,457,905	−0.12%

== Politics ==
=== Local elections ===
The president of the Departmental Council is Jean-Claude Leroy, elected in 2017.

=== National politics ===
In the second round of the French presidential elections of 2017 Pas-de-Calais was one of only two departments in which the candidate of the Front National, Marine Le Pen, received a majority of the votes cast: 52.06%.

=== Presidential elections 2nd round ===
Election	Winning candidate	Party	%	2nd place candidate	Party	%
2022	Marine Le Pen	FN	57.49	Emmanuel Macron	LREM	42.51
2017	Marine Le Pen	FN	52.06	Emmanuel Macron	LREM	47.94
2012	François Hollande	PS	56.18	Nicolas Sarkozy	UMP	43.82
2007	Ségolène Royal	PS	52.04	Nicolas Sarkozy	UMP	47.96
2002	Jacques Chirac	RPR	77.83	Jean-Marie Le Pen	FN	22.17
1995	Lionel Jospin	PS	57.28	Jacques Chirac	RPR	42.72

=== Current National Assembly Representatives ===
Constituency	Member	Party
Pas-de-Calais's 1st constituency	Emmanuel Blairy	National Rally
Pas-de-Calais's 2nd constituency	Agnès Pannier-Runacher	Renaissance
Pas-de-Calais's 3rd constituency	Bruno Clavet	National Rally
Pas-de-Calais's 4th constituency	Philippe Fait	Renaissance
Pas-de-Calais's 5th constituency	Antoine Golliot	National Rally
Pas-de-Calais's 6th constituency	Christine Engrand	National Rally
Pas-de-Calais's 7th constituency	Marc de Fleurian	National Rally
Pas-de-Calais's 8th constituency	Auguste Evrard	National Rally
Pas-de-Calais's 9th constituency	Caroline Parmentier	National Rally
Pas-de-Calais's 10th constituency	Thierry Frappé	National Rally
Pas-de-Calais's 11th constituency	Marine Le Pen	National Rally
Pas-de-Calais's 12th constituency	Bruno Bilde	National Rally

=== National Assembly Representatives (2017 to 2022) ===
Constituency	Member	Party
Pas-de-Calais's 1st constituency	Bruno Duvergé	MoDem
Pas-de-Calais's 2nd constituency	Jacqueline Maquet	La République En Marche!
Pas-de-Calais's 3rd constituency	Emmanuel Blairy	National Rally
Pas-de-Calais's 4th constituency	Daniel Fasquelle	The Republicans
Pas-de-Calais's 5th constituency	Jean-Pierre Pont	La République En Marche!
Pas-de-Calais's 6th constituency	Brigitte Bourguignon	La République En Marche!
Pas-de-Calais's 7th constituency	Pierre-Henri Dumont	The Republicans
Pas-de-Calais's 8th constituency	Benoît Potterie	La République En Marche!
Pas-de-Calais's 9th constituency	Marguerite Deprez-Audebert	MoDem
Pas-de-Calais's 10th constituency	Myriane Houplain	National Rally
Pas-de-Calais's 11th constituency	Marine Le Pen	National Rally
Pas-de-Calais's 12th constituency	Bruno Bilde	National Rally

== Education ==
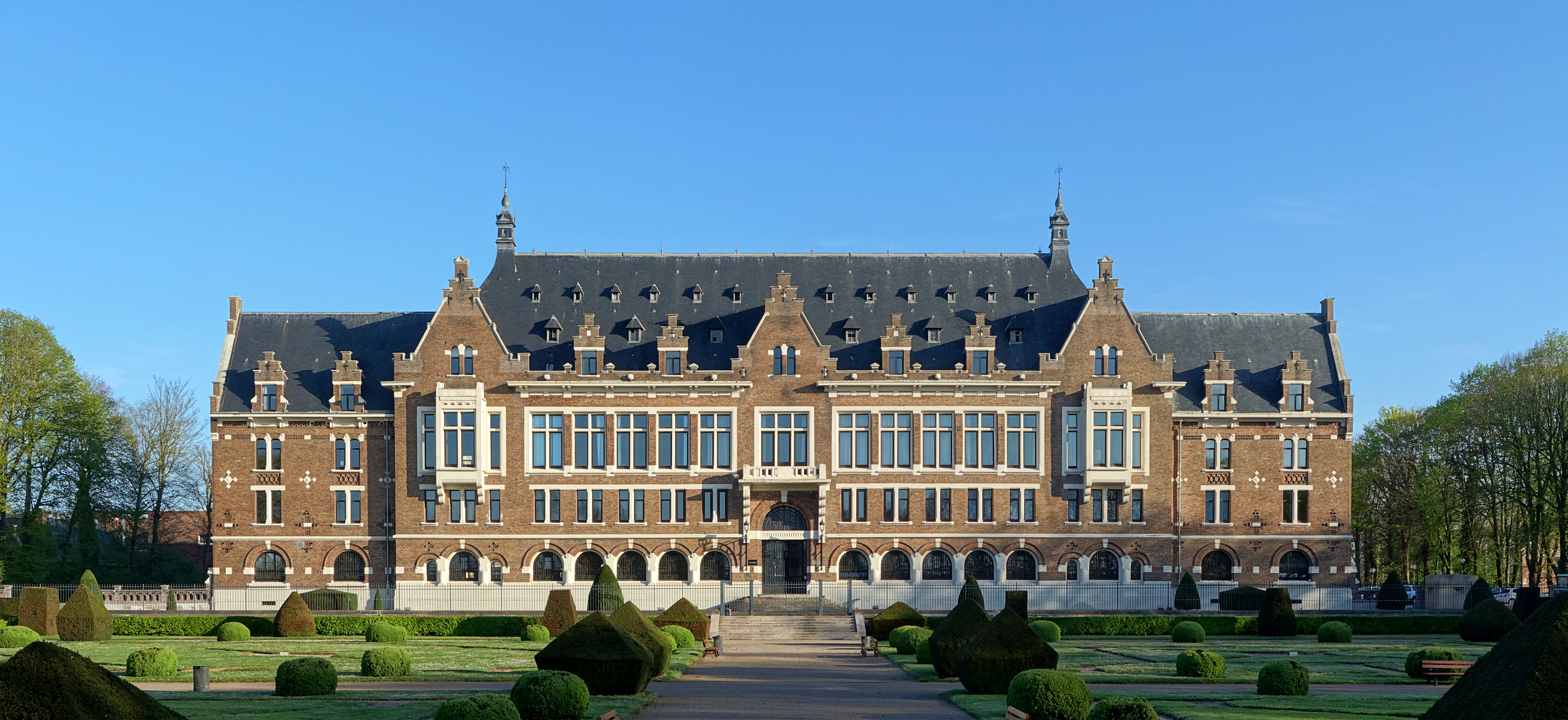
The Université d'Artois' campus in Lens sits in the ancient headquarters of Compagnie des mines.

There are currently two public universities in the department. Although it is one of the most populous departments of France, Pas-de-Calais did not contain a university until 1991 when the French government created two universities: ULCO (Université du Littoral Côte d'Opale) on the western part of the department, and Université d'Artois on the eastern part.

== Tourism ==
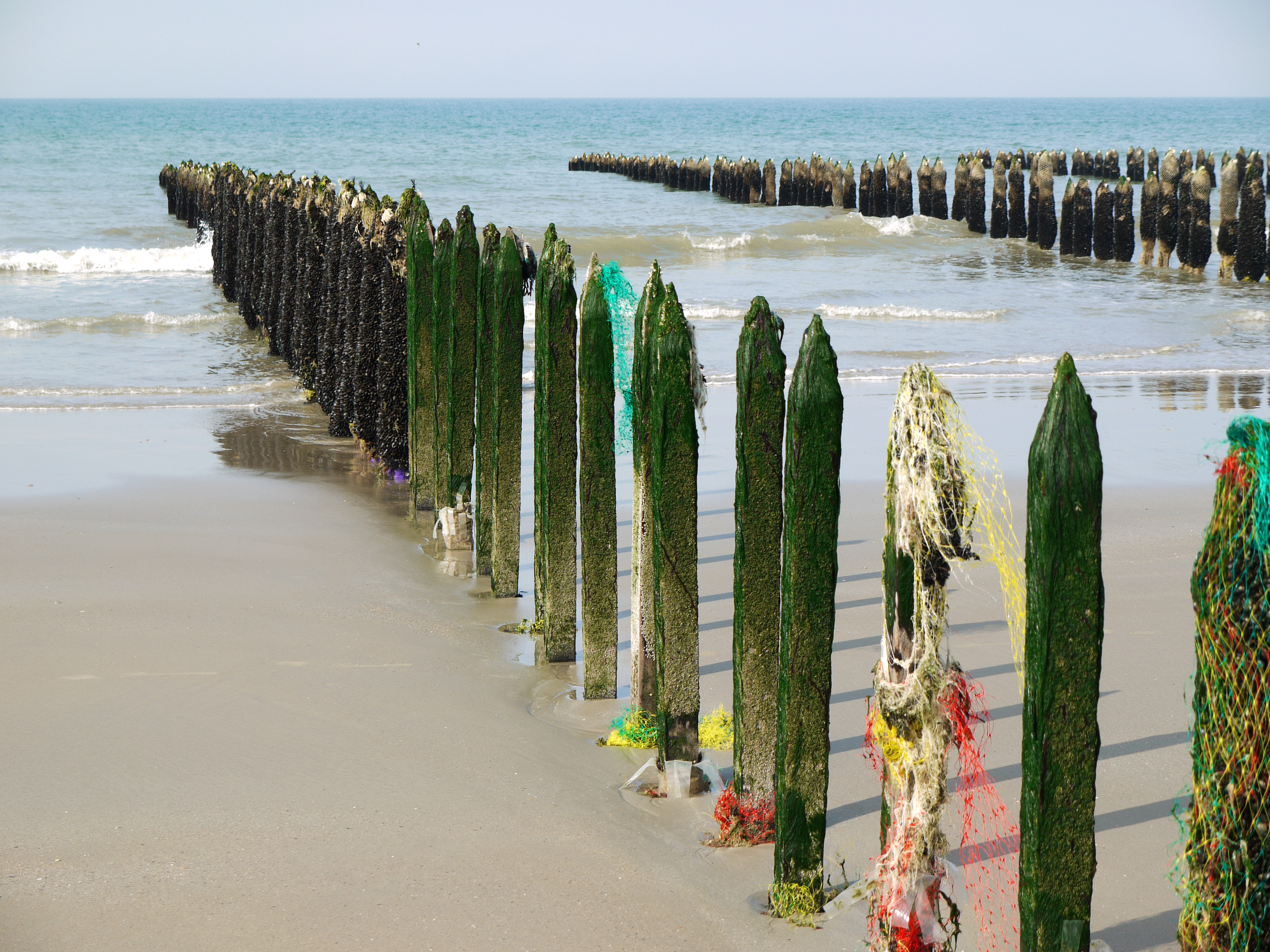
Mussel aquaculture in Wissant

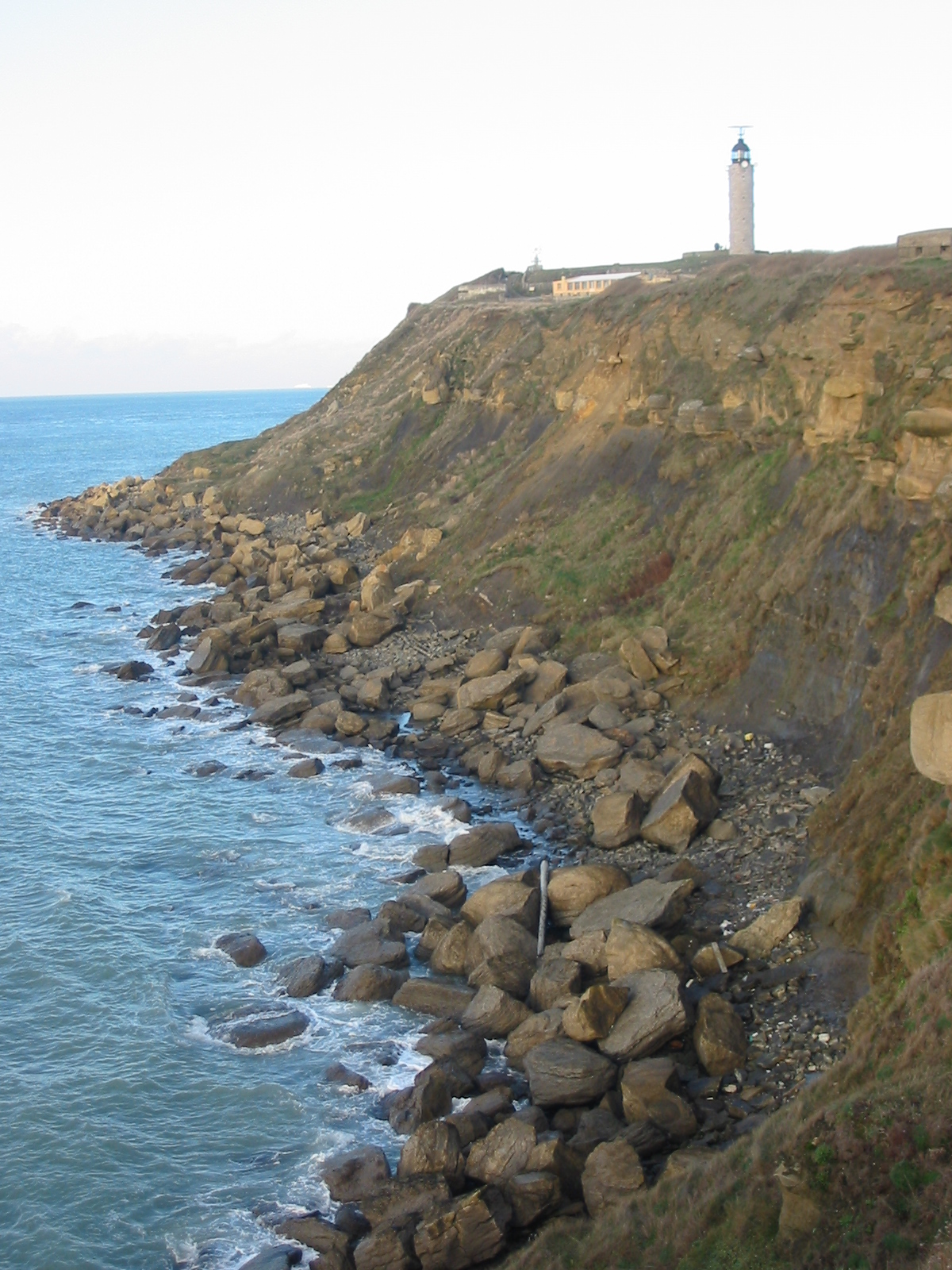
Cap Gris Nez

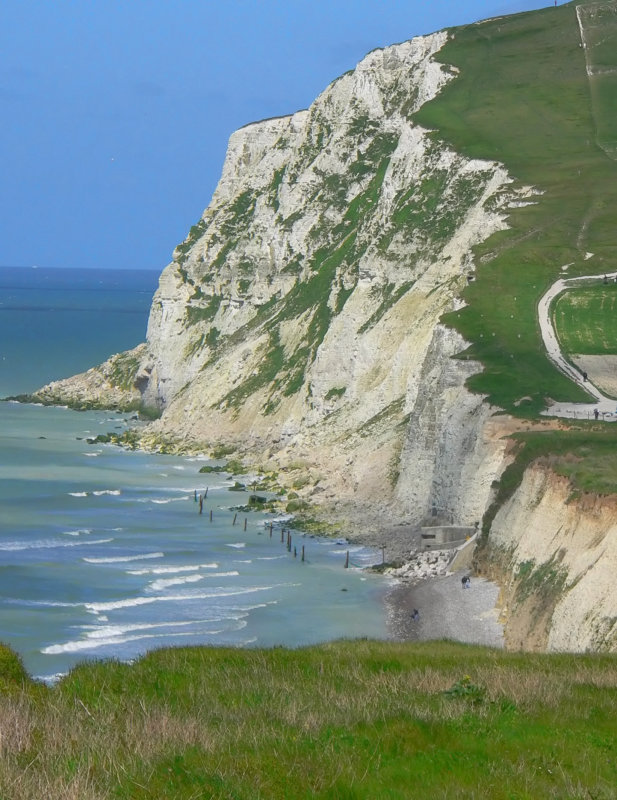
Cap Blanc Nez

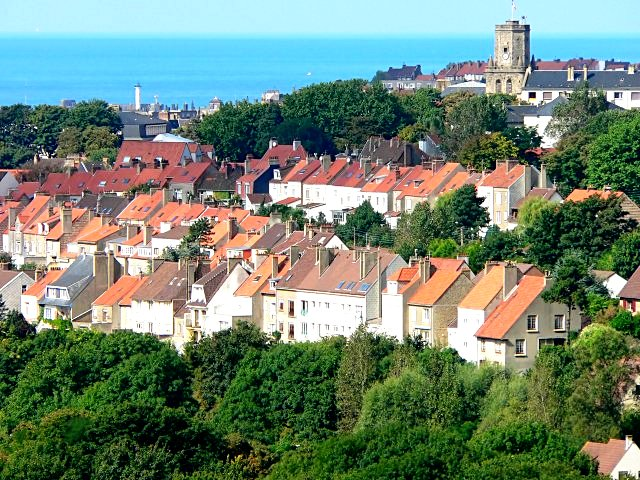
Boulogne-sur-Mer

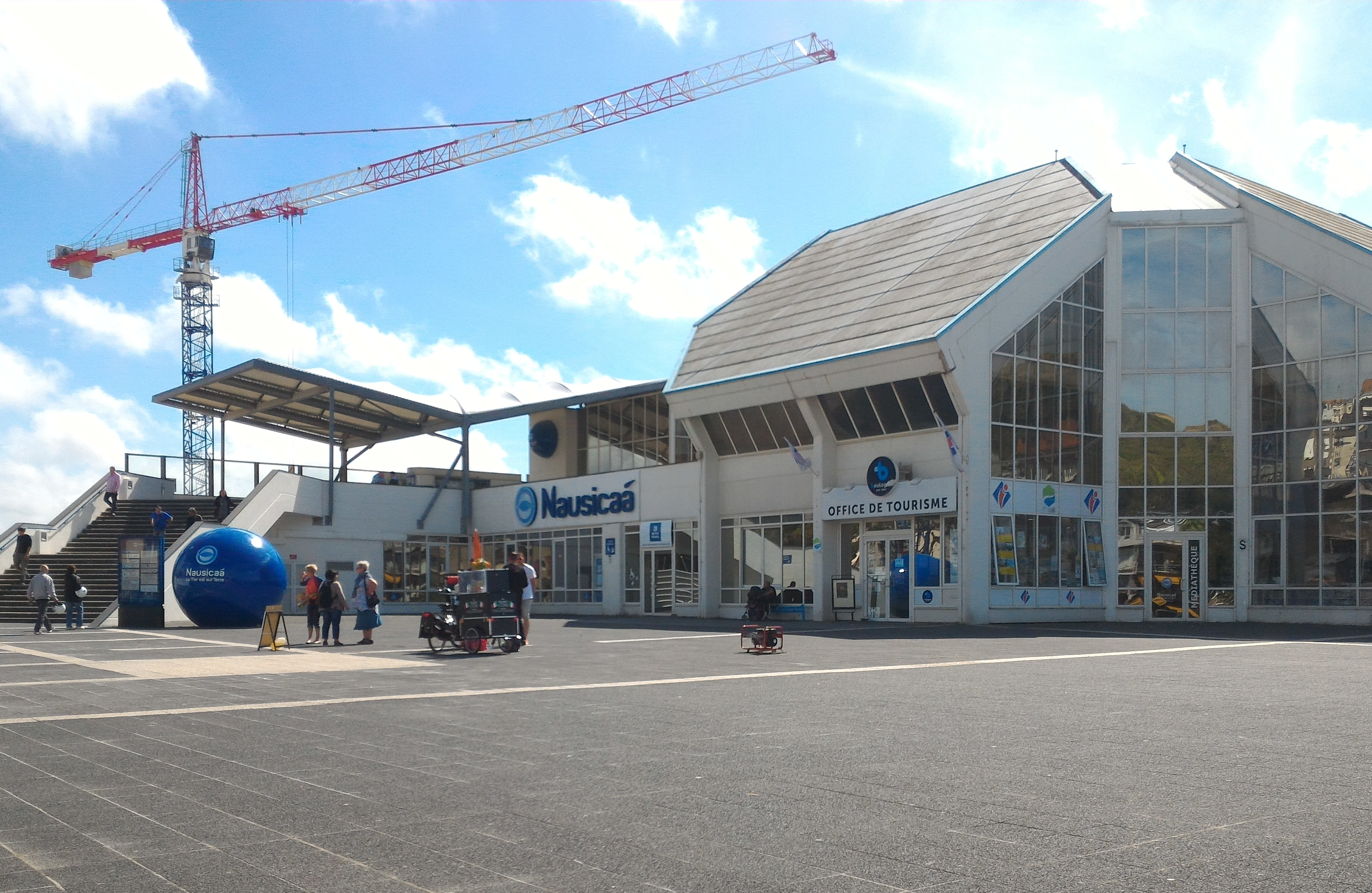
Nausicaä

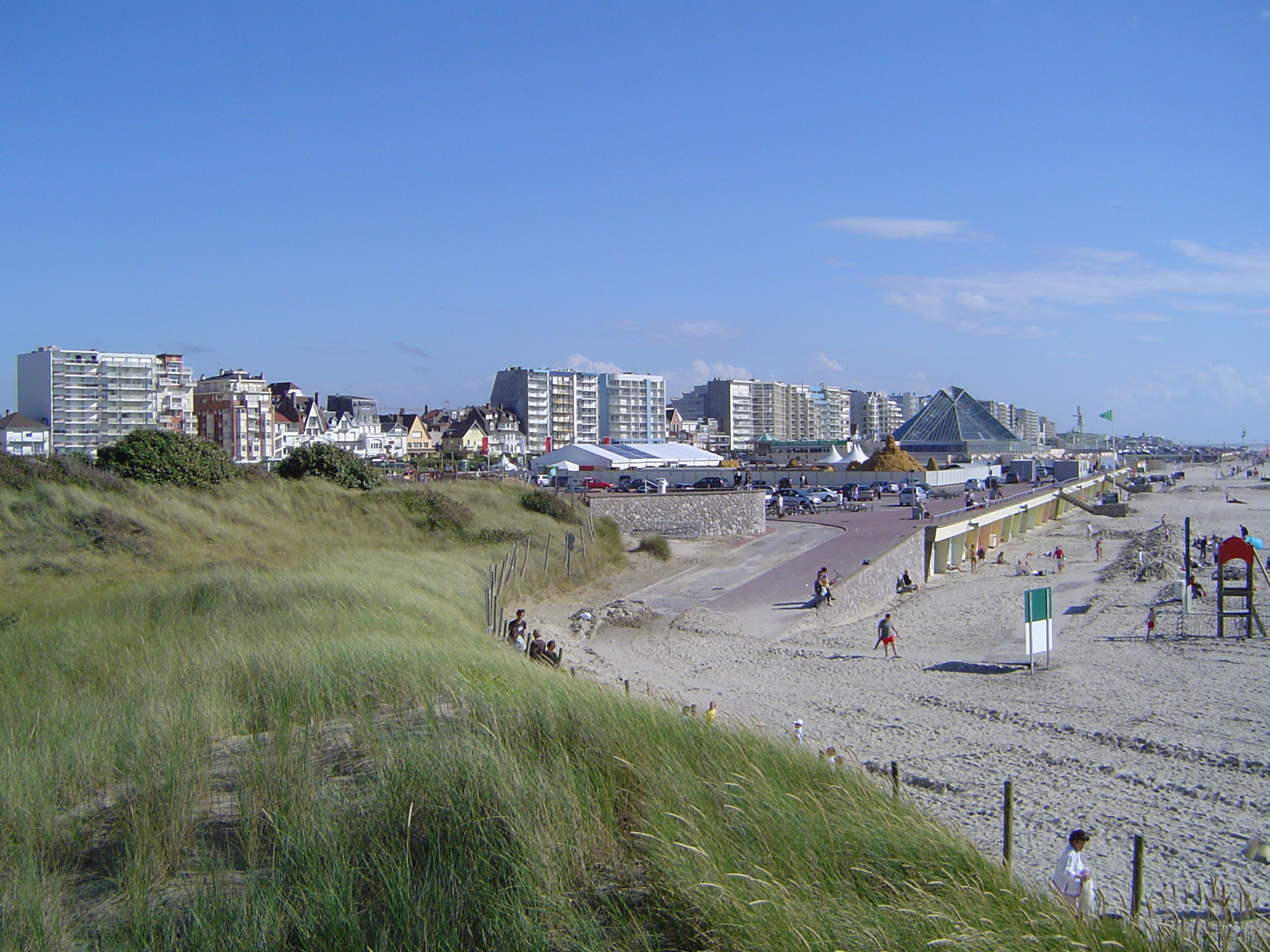
Le Touquet

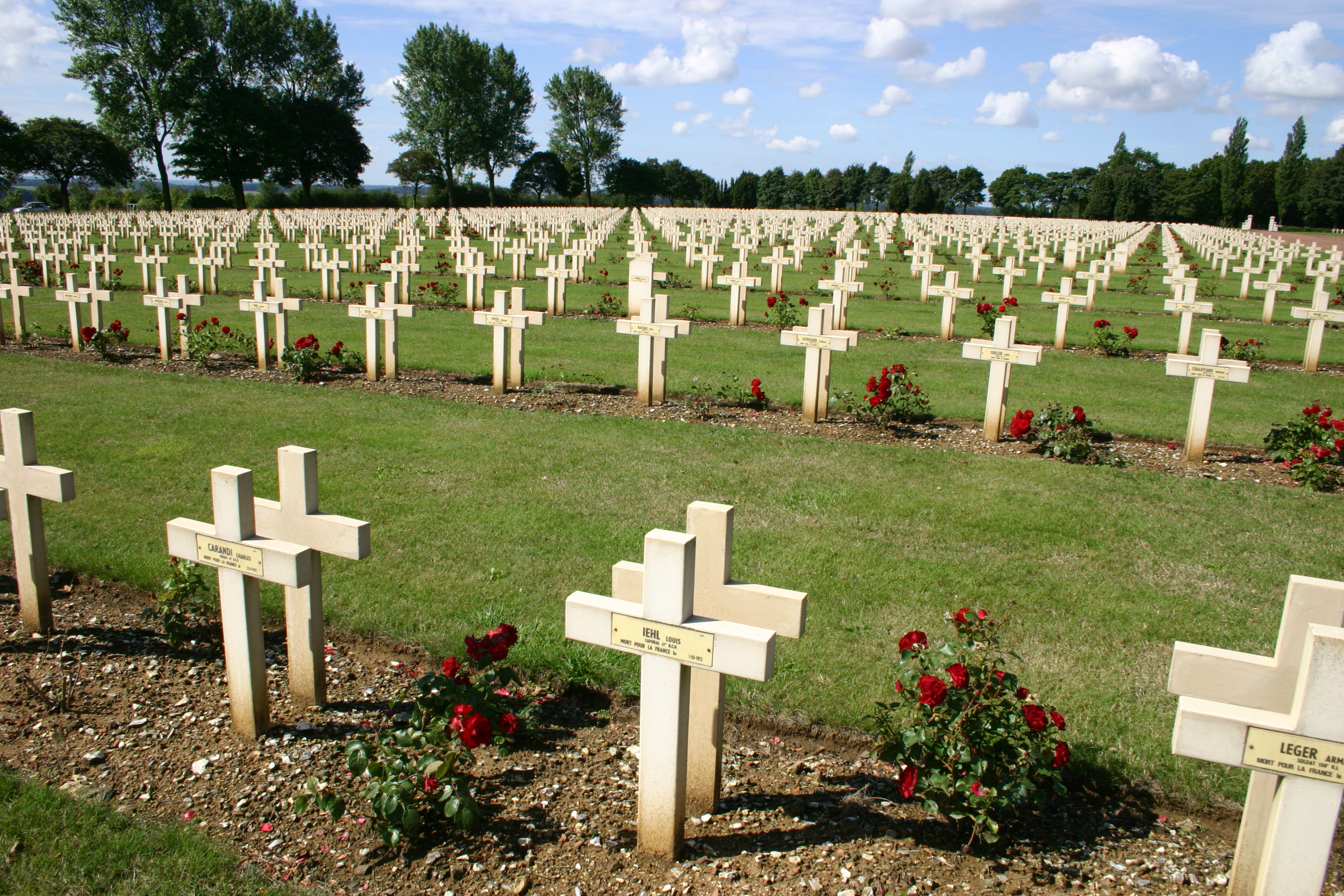
Notre Dame de Lorette

Canadian National Vimy Memorial, 11 kilometres (6.8 mi) from Arras

Liberty Leading the People on permanent display in Louvre-Lens since 2012

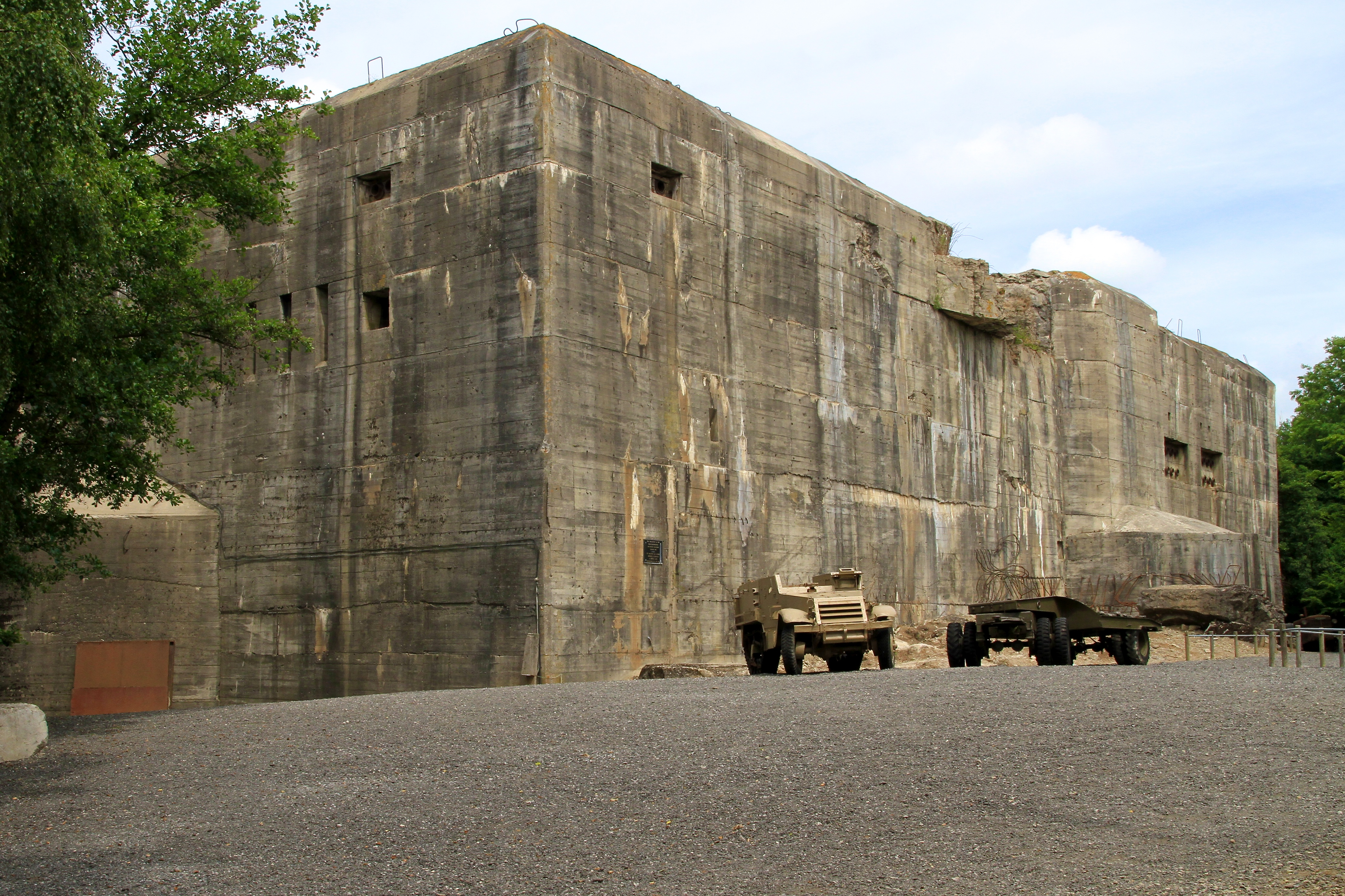
Blockhaus d'Éperlecques

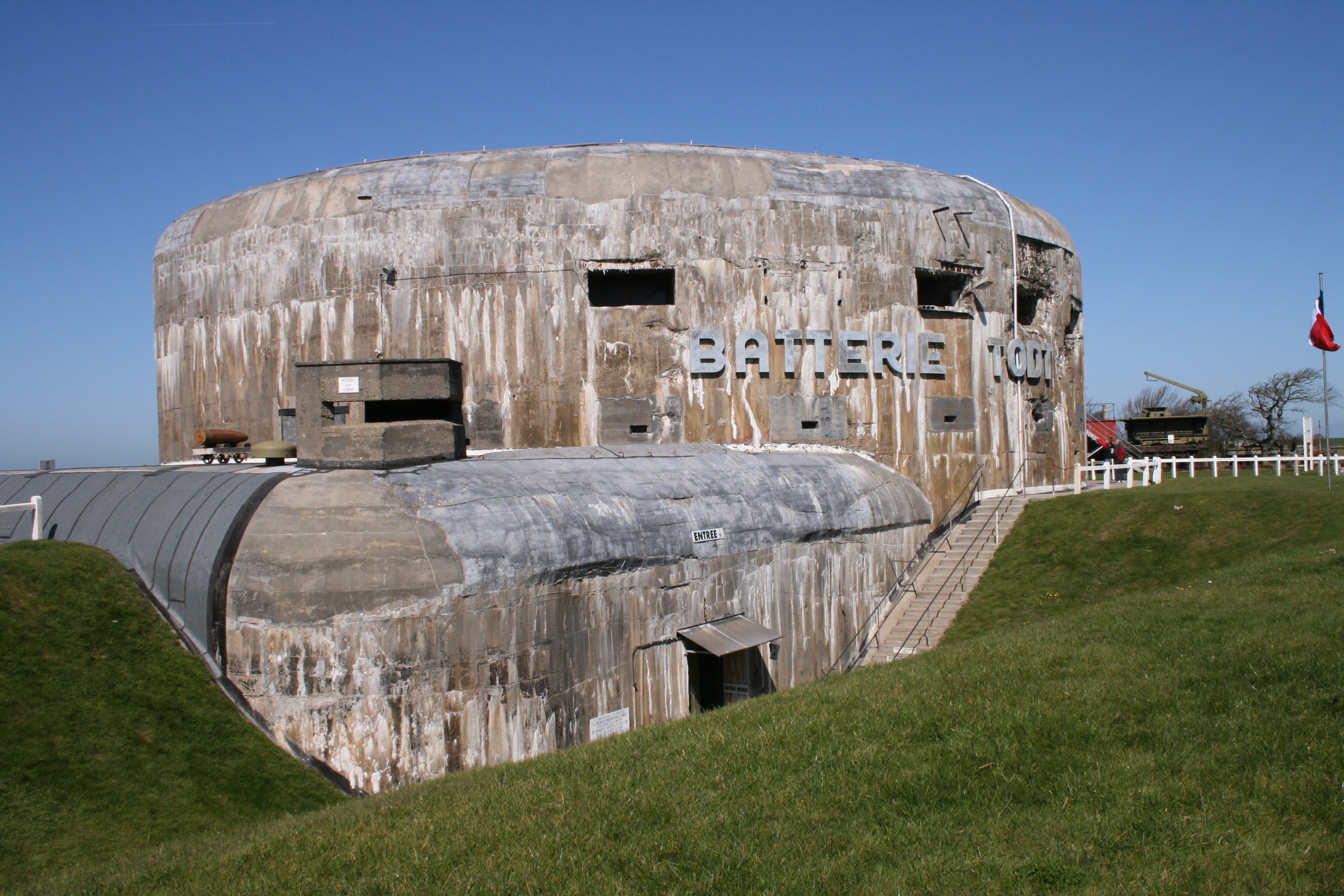
Todt Battery, Audinghen

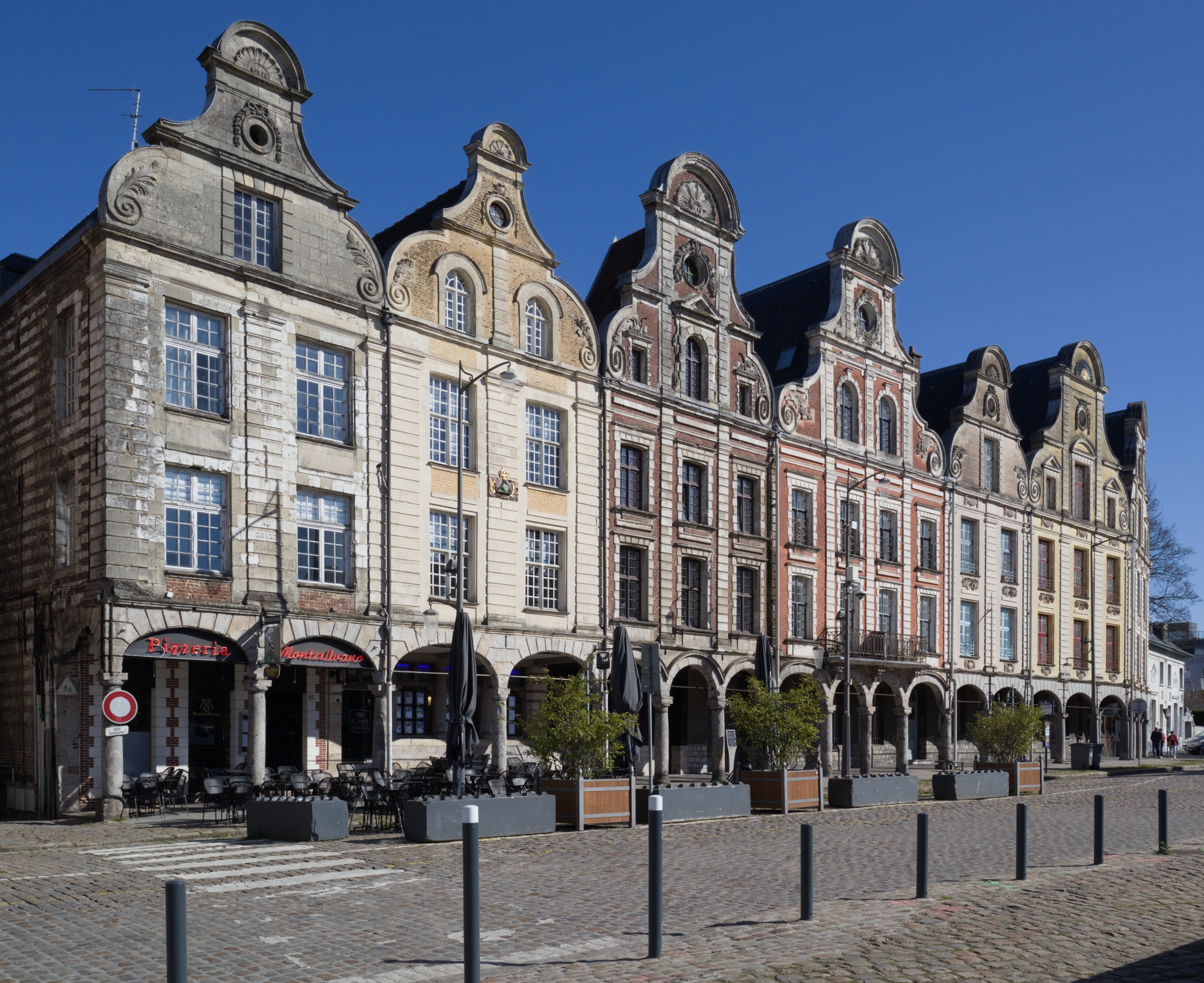
Grand-Place of Arras

== See also ==
- Cantons of the Pas-de-Calais department
- Communes of the Pas-de-Calais department
- Arrondissements of the Pas-de-Calais department
- Battle of Vimy Ridge
- 7 Valleys Pas-de-Calais
- Achicourt station
