= 2024 French legislative election in Eure-et-Loir =

Following the first round of the 2024 French legislative election on 30 June 2024, runoff elections in each constituency where no candidate received a vote share greater than 50 percent were scheduled for 7 July. Candidates permitted to stand in the runoff elections needed to either come in first or second place in the first round or achieve more than 12.5 percent of the votes of the entire electorate (as opposed to 12.5 percent of the vote share due to low turnout).

== Eure-et-Loir ==
=== 1st constituency ===
Candidate	Party or alliance		First round		Second round	
Candidate	Party or alliance		Votes	%	Votes	%
Emma Minot	National Rally		20,576	33.66	23,315	39.41
Guillaume Kasbarian	Ensemble	Renaissance	20,105	32.89	35,842	60.59
Jean-François Bridet	New Popular Front	The Ecologists	14,705	24.05		
Ladislas Vergne	The Republicans		4,388	7.18		
Pierre-Louis Delauney	Reconquête		698	1.14		
Marie-José Aubert	Far-left	Lutte Ouvrière	659	1.08		
Total			61,131	100.00	59,157	100.00
Valid votes			61,131	97.78	59,157	95.09
Invalid votes			350	0.56	696	1.12
Blank votes			1,035	1.66	2,358	3.79
Total votes			62,516	100.00	62,211	100.00
Registered voters/turnout			91,565	68.27	91,587	67.93

=== 2nd constituency ===
Candidate	Party or alliance		First round		Second round	
Candidate	Party or alliance		Votes	%	Votes	%
Olivier Dubois	National Rally		17,908	38.33	19,727	42.75
Olivier Marleix	The Republicans		12,109	25.92	26,422	57.25
Nadia Faveris	New Popular Front	Socialist Party	11,956	25.59		
Florent Mazy	Ensemble	Horizons	3,381	7.24		
Béatrice Jaffrenou	Far-left	Independent	535	1.15		
Florence Rogé	Reconquête		477	1.02		
Adrien Denis	Far-left	Lutte Ouvrière	357	0.76		
Total			46,723	100.00	46,149	100.00
Valid votes			46,723	97.95	46,149	96.12
Invalid votes			257	0.54	451	0.94
Blank votes			723	1.52	1,410	2.94
Total votes			47,703	100.00	48,010	100.00
Registered voters/turnout			75,563	63.13	75,580	63.52

=== 3rd constituency ===
Candidate	Party or alliance		First round		Second round	
Candidate	Party or alliance		Votes	%	Votes	%
Christophe Bay	National Rally		19,178	42.41	21,478	47.42
Harold Huwart	Ensemble	Radical Party of the Left	16,439	36.35	23,815	52.58
Rémi Martial	The Republicans		5,748	12.71		
Vincent Chevrollier	Far-left	Lutte Ouvrière	3,107	6.87		
Eric Laqua	Reconquête		751	1.66		
Total			45,223	100.00	45,293	100.00
Valid votes			45,223	96.80	45,293	95.69
Invalid votes			376	0.80	493	1.04
Blank votes			1,120	2.40	1,545	3.26
Total votes			46,719	100.00	47,331	100.00
Registered voters/turnout			71,148	65.66	71,161	66.51

=== 4th constituency ===
Candidate	Party or alliance		First round		Second round	
Candidate	Party or alliance		Votes	%	Votes	%
Roger Pecout	Union of the far right	The Republicans	18,854	43.15	21,025	48.26
Philippe Vigier	Ensemble	Democratic Movement	17,236	39.44	22,542	51.74
Sylviane Boëns	New Popular Front	Socialist Party	6,243	14.29		
Vincent Lhopiteau	Reconquête		817	1.87		
Anne-Laure Assayag	Far-left	Lutte Ouvrière	548	1.25		
Total			43,698	100.00	43,567	100.00
Valid votes			43,698	97.55	43,567	96.50
Invalid votes			275	0.61	449	0.99
Blank votes			823	1.84	1,130	2.50
Total votes			44,796	100.00	45,146	100.00
Registered voters/turnout			67,351	66.51	67,367	67.02
