= Christelle Minard =

French politician

Member of the National Assembly for Eure-et-Loir's 2nd constituency
- Incumbent
- Assumed office 8 July 2025
- Preceded by: Olivier Marleix

Departmental Councillor of Eure-et-Loir
- Incumbent
- Assumed office 2 April 2015
- Constituency: Canton of Saint-Lubin-des-Joncherets

Mayor of Tremblay-les-Villages
- Incumbent
- Assumed office 30 March 2014
- Preceded by: Francis Cousin

Personal details
- Born: Christelle Raimbert; 4 October 1970 (age 55)
- Party: The Republicans
- Occupation: Farmer

Christelle Minard (née Raimbert; born 4 October 1970) is a French farmer and politician. She has been the Member of the National Assembly for Eure-et-Loir's 2nd constituency since 8 July 2025.

== Biography ==
Minard has served as a departmental councillor since 2015 and is a vice-president of the Departmental Council of Eure-et-Loir.

She has been the mayor of Tremblay-les-Villages since 2014 and serves as a vice-president of the Communauté d'agglomération du Pays de Dreux intercommunal structure.

Minard was the substitute for Olivier Marleix, the deputy for Eure-et-Loir's 2nd constituency, during the 2024 French legislative election. Following Marleix's death on 7 July 2025, she assumed the role of deputy.

== See also ==
- Olivier Marleix
- Eure-et-Loir's 2nd constituency
- The Republicans
