= Eure-et-Loir's 3rd constituency =

Constituency of the National Assembly of France

3rd constituency of Eure-et-Loir
- inline Constituency of the National Assembly of France

- Constituency in department

- Eure-et-Loir in France
- Deputy: Harold Huwart; PRV
- Department: Eure-et-Loir
- Cantons: Authon-du-Perche, Courville-sur-Eure, Illiers-Combray, La Loupe, Lucé, Mainvilliers, Nogent-le-Rotrou, Thiron

The 3rd constituency of Eure-et-Loir is a French legislative constituency in the Eure-et-Loir département.

== Assembly Members ==
Election	Member	Party
1988	Bertrand Gallet	PS
1993	Gérard Hamel	UDF
1997	François Huwart	PRG
2007	Laure de La Raudière	UMP
2012	Laure de La Raudière	UMP
2015	Laure de La Raudière	LR
2017	Laure de La Raudière	LR
2017	Laure de La Raudière	Agir
2021	Luc Lamirault	Agir
2022	Luc Lamirault	H
2024	Harold Huwart	PRV

== Election results ==
=== 2024 ===
Candidate	Party	Alliance	First round			Second round		
Candidate	Party	Alliance	Votes	%	+/–	Votes	%	+/–
Christophe Bay	RN		19,178	42.41	+	21,478	47.42	+1.38
Harold Huwart	PRV	Ensemble	16,439	36.35		23,815	52.58	new
Rémi Martial	LR	UDC	5,748	12.71	+3.80			
Vincent Chevrollier	LO		3,107	6.87	+5.88			
Eric Laqua	REC		751	1.66	-1.78			
Votes			45,223	100.00		45,293	100.00	
Valid votes			45,223	96.80	-0.99	45,293	95.69	+4.11
Blank votes			1,120	2.40	+0.85	1,545	3.26	-3.08
Null votes			376	0.80	+0.14	493	1.04	-1.05
Turnout			46,719	65.66	+18.46	47,331	66.51	+20.97
Abstentions			24,429	34.34	-18.46	23,830	33.49	-20.97
Registered voters			71,148			71,161		
Result			PRV GAIN FROM H					

=== 2022 ===
Legislative Election 2022: Eure-et-Loir's 3rd constituency
Party	Candidate	Votes	%	±%
HOR (Ensemble)	Luc Lamirault	9,505	28.87	N/A
RN	Régine Flaunet	8,086	24.56	+6.60
LFI (NUPÉS)	Valéria Orfila	6,283	19.08	+6.08
LR (UDC)	Rémi Martial	2,934	8.91	−21.91
DVD	Carole Geraci	1,705	5.18	N/A
REC	Éric Laqua	1,134	3.44	N/A
DVE	Vivette Joly	904	2.75	N/A
Others	N/A	2,376	-	−
Turnout		32,927	47.20	−2.92
2nd round result
HOR (Ensemble)	Luc Lamirault	16,055	53.96	N/A
RN	Régine Flaunet	13,701	46.04	N/A
Turnout		29,756	45.54	+0.50
HOR gain from LR				

=== 2017 ===
Candidate	Label	First round		Second round	
Candidate	Label	Votes	%	Votes	%
Harold Huwart	PRG	10,780	31.16	12,729	43.90
Laure de La Raudière	LR	10,662	30.82	16,268	56.10
Guylaine Bercher	FN	6,211	17.96		
Pascale Certain	FI	3,498	10.11		
Françoise Réparat	ECO	1,000	2.89		
Aziz Bouslimani	DVG	526	1.52		
Roger Tran	DLF	520	1.50		
Florent Gauthier	DVD	378	1.09		
Vincent Chevrollier	EXG	347	1.00		
Vivette Joly	ECO	286	0.83		
Élisabeth Bacle	EXG	201	0.58		
Émilie Fabre	DIV	183	0.53		
Votes		34,592	100.00	28,997	100.00
Valid votes		34,592	97.60	28,997	91.01
Blank votes		593	1.67	2,000	6.28
Null votes		258	0.73	863	2.71
Turnout		35,443	50.12	31,860	45.04
Abstentions		35,280	49.88	38,883	54.96
Registered voters		70,723		70,743	
Source: Ministry of the Interior

=== 2012 ===
2012 legislative election in Eure-Et-Loir's 3rd constituency
Candidate	Party	First round		Second round	
Candidate	Party	Votes	%	Votes	%
Laure de La Raudière	UMP	15,906	38.41%	21,556	52.58%
Harold Huwart	PRG	14,837	35.83%	19,443	47.42%
Philippe Loiseau	FN	6,304	15.22%		
Mylène Chartrain	FG	1,730	4.18%		
Marie-Hélène Avenet-Chevee	MoDem	638	1.54%		
Roland Hélie	UDN	371	0.90%		
Vivette Joly	??	331	0.80%		
Eric Marchand	DLR	248	0.60%		
Anne Bitterlin	MEI	240	0.58%		
Vincent Chevrollier	LO	226	0.55%		
Nicole Mas	POI	193	0.47%		
Sygrid Dumoncay	NPA	156	0.38%		
Amandine Dalmasso	AEI	132	0.32%		
Pierre Sabattier	DVD (UPF)	94	0.23%		
Valid votes		41,406	98.52%	40,999	97.16%
Spoilt and null votes		622	1.48%	1,197	2.84%
Votes cast / turnout		42,028	58.97%	42,196	59.21%
Abstentions		29,241	41.03%	29,067	40.79%
Registered voters		71,269	100.00%	71,263	100.00%

=== 2007 ===
Legislative Election 2007: Eure-et-Loir's 3rd constituency
Party	Candidate	Votes	%	±%
UMP	Laure de La Raudière	14,579	34.97	+0.13
PRG	François Huwart	12,470	29.91	−1.97
DVD	Patrick Hoguet	4,797	11.51	N/A
FN	Philippe Loiseau	3,000	7.20	−8.82
MoDem	Isabelle Diveki	2,309	5.54	N/A
LV	Karim Laanaya	1,125	2.70	N/A
Others	N/A	3,410	-	−
Turnout		42,545	59.69	−3.63
2nd round result
UMP	Laure de La Raudière	21,648	53.32	+0.24
PRG	François Huwart	18,950	46.68	−0.24
Turnout		41,896	58.78	−1.20
UMP hold				

=== 2002 ===
Legislative Election 2002: Eure-et-Loir's 3rd constituency
Party	Candidate	Votes	%	±%
UMP	Patrick Hoguet	14,945	34.84	N/A
PRG	François Huwart	13,676	31.88	+5.36
FN	Philippe Loiseau	6,837	16.02	−3.83
DL	Jacques Morland	2,184	5.09	N/A
CPNT	François Picard	1,053	2.45	N/A
PCF	Michel Quechon	1,042	2.43	−3.61
LO	Anne-Catherine Godde	893	2.08	−1.12
MPF	Hugues Deballon	759	1.77	−1.95
PT	Stéphane Formery	582	1.36	N/A
PR	Sylvie Sabatier	504	1.17	−0.21
MNR	Luc Poitvin	385	0.90	N/A
Turnout		43,903	63.32	−4.70
2nd round result
UMP	Patrick Hoguet	21,181	53.08	N/A
PRG	François Huwart	18,725	46.92	+4.25
Turnout		41,589	59.98	−13.72
UMP gain from PRG				

=== 1997 ===
Legislative Election 1997: Eure-et-Loir's 3rd constituency
Party	Candidate	Votes	%	±%
PR (UDF)	Patrick Hoguet	12,886	29.56	
PRG	François Huwart	11,557	26.52	
FN	Philippe Loiseau	8,653	19.85	
PCF	Jacques Malnou	2,631	6.04	
LV	Mireille Lépine	1,922	4.41	
LDI	Hugues Deballon	1,623	3.72	
LO	Roland Jo	1,393	3.20	
GE	Alexis Patronoff	1,344	3.08	
DVD	Thierry Rey	686	1.57	
MDC	Erik Lambert	600	1.38	
DIV	Gaetan Thoumieux	291	0.67	
Turnout		46,136	68.02	
2nd round result
PRG	François Huwart	20,502	42.67	
PR (UDF)	Patrick Hoguet	19,745	41.09	
FN	Philippe Loiseau	7,806	16.24	
Turnout		49,964	73.70	
PRG gain from UDF				

== Sources ==
- Official results of French elections from 1998: "Résultats électoraux officiels en France" (in French). Archived from the original on 20 December 2011.
