= Marie-France Stirbois =

French politician (1944–2006)

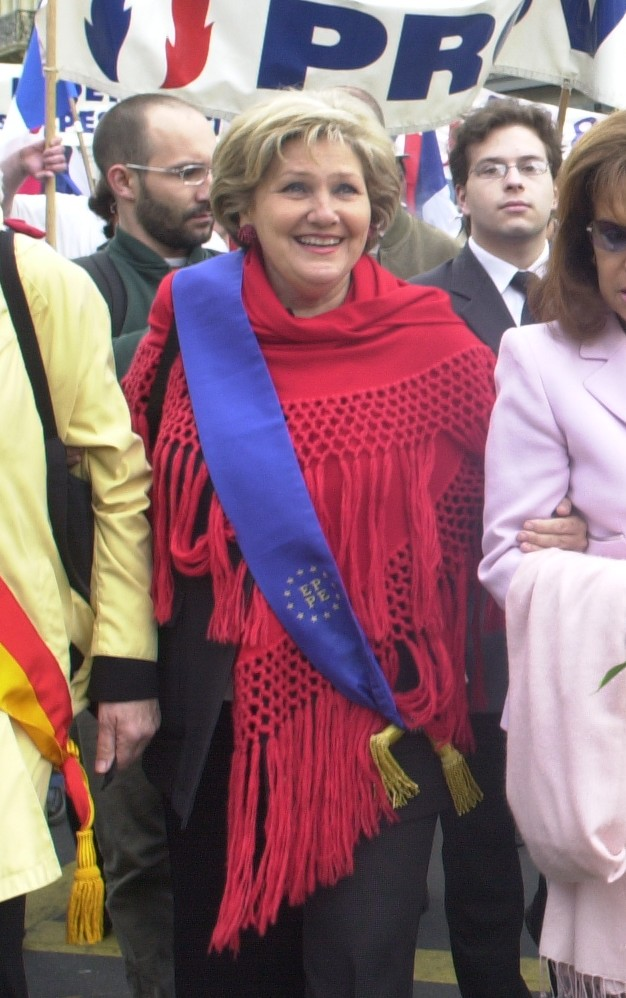
- Marie-France Stirbois in 2004

Member of the European Parliament
- In office 1994–1999

Member of the National Assembly for Eure-et-Loir's 2nd constituency
- In office 1989–1993
- Preceded by: Martial Taugourdeau
- Succeeded by: Gérard Hamel

Personal details
- Born: 11 November 1944 Paris, France
- Died: 16 April 2006 (aged 61) Villeneuve-Loubet, France
- Party: National Front
- Spouse: Jean-Pierre Stirbois

Marie-France Stirbois (born Marie-France Charles on 11 November 1944 in Paris, died 17 April 2006 in Nice of cancer) was a French National Front politician, representing Dreux from 1989 to 1993, and a Member of the European Parliament from 1994 to 1999 and from 2003 to 2004.

An old militant of the National Front, Marie-France Stirbois marked French political life by achieving (with her husband Jean-Pierre Stirbois) the first electoral success of the French National Front in 1983 in Dreux. Between 1989 and 1993, she was the only National Front member to sit on the National Assembly, after the Yann Piat camp had defected.

She is buried in Montparnasse Cemetery in Paris.

== Early years ==
Youngest of four daughters in the Charles family, Marie-France's father was manager of a refrigeration warehouse and canning factory. Her mother was a housewife. Both were ardent Gaullists until 1962. Her mother received the Croix de Guerre with palms, having been imprisoned by the Germans, and her two sisters were pillars of the resistance until the end of the war. In the 1950s, the Charles family moved to Dreux in Eure-et-Loir.

The young Marie-France's first political commitment was during the Algerian War; she opposed independence for Algeria. In 1964 she was active in the Jean-Louis Tixier-Vignancour campaign, an extreme right candidate in the 1965 French presidential election. It was at this time that she met her future husband, Jean-Pierre Stirbois. She moved closer to the Occident movement.

During the events of May 1968, she was a student at Nanterre, where, in the French National Federation of Students, she spoke out against the strikers.

As a qualified English teacher, she married the next year and taught English for seven years at Colombes. She then stopped working to raise her two children.

== A political couple ==
Like her husband, she argued in the first "Solidarity" movement of the extreme right for the Mouvement jeune révolution ((in French) "Young Revolutionary Movement"), which rejected totalitarian Marxism and international capitalism. When the Stirbois couple joined the National Front in 1977, five years after its establishment, each embraced militant political activism. She became co-director of the printing press that her husband created to support their political activities in Dreux.

Unlike her husband, Marie-France made her debut in the 1978 legislative elections in Paris. Her first electoral success was in the cantonales of 1982, with 10% of the vote, and then she stood for Nanterre in hauts de Seine in 1985. Her first national bid for Dreux was in 1986, while three years earlier, her husband became National Front Deputy Mayor thanks to an electoral alliance.

== The success of "Widow Stirbois" ==
Jean-Pierre died in a road accident in autumn 1988. Marie-France focused on local politics and represented the National Front in Dreux, first as a city councillor, then at elections in March 1989. She became a member at Eure-et-Loir in December that year after an election with 60% voter turnout, losing the mandate in March 1993. For four years she was the only National Front representative in the National Assembly.

In March 1992 she was elected conseillère générale ((in French) "General Counsel") and then in June 1994, Member of the European Parliament and regional advisor. She remained in the European Parliament until 1999.

After several failed attempts to become Mayor of Dreux, she moved to Nice, where she was elected City Councillor in 2001.

In 2003, she took Jean-Marie Le Pen's seat after his revocation of mandate as an MEP. In 2004 she was elected Regional Councillor of Provence-Alpes-Côte d'Azur, and she died in 2006.

== Dissent in the National Front ==
Marie-France was twice sanctioned by National Front institutions and suspended from her duties in the party's political bureau.

== Political career ==
- Presidential Campaign 1965
- 1966 - 1977 Active participation in solidarity
- Member of the French National Front from 1977 to her death.
- National delegate to the National Front from 1999 to her death.
- Member of the Political Bureau of the National Front from 1990 to her death (she was temporarily suspended in October 2005).
- General Counsel of Eure-et-Loir from 1994 to 2001.
- Regional advisor of the centre (translator's note: meaning "central geographic region", not "centre" on the left wing-right wing axis) from 1986 to 2004.
- Member of Eure-et-Loir from 1989 to 1993.
- MEP 1994 to 1999 and 2003 to 2004.
- City Council of Dreux 1989 to 2001.
- Nice City Council from 2001 to her death.
- Regional Councilor of Provence-Alpes-Côte d'Azur from 2004 to her death.

== Sources ==
This article was translated from its equivalent in the French Wikipedia on 19 July 2009.
