= Laure de La Raudière =

French politician (born 1965)

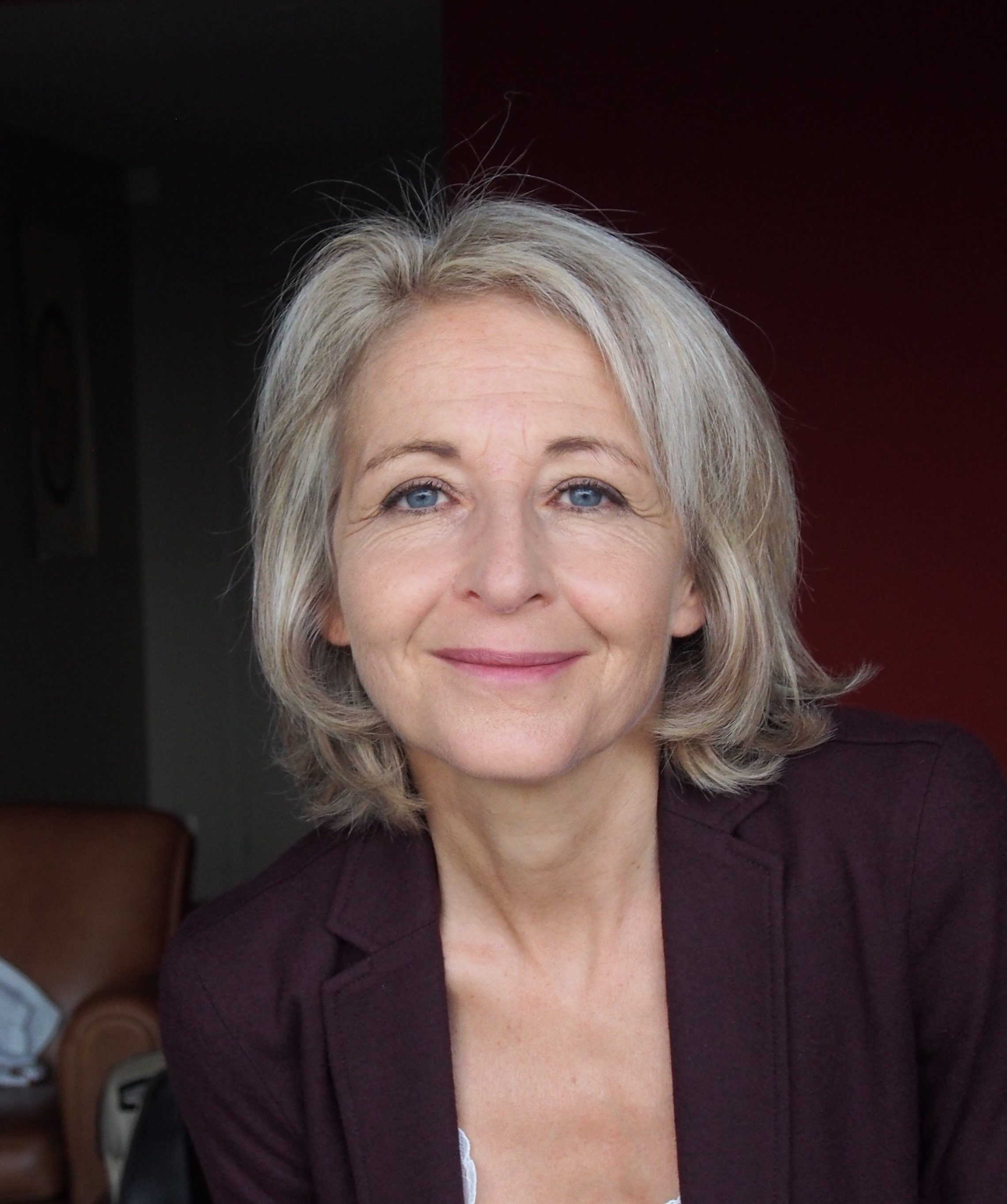

Member of the National Assembly for Eure-et-Loir's 3rd constituency
- In office 20 June 2007 – 21 January 2021
- Preceded by: François Huwart
- Succeeded by: Luc Lamirault

Personal details
- Born: Laure du Tillet; 12 February 1965 (age 61) Neuilly-sur-Seine, France
- Party: Agir; The Republicans
- Education: École normale supérieure Télécom ParisTech

Laure de La Raudière (born 12 February 1965) is a French politician of Agir who has been serving chair of the Regulatory Authority for Electronic Communications, Postal and Print Media Distribution (ARCEP) since 2021. From 2007 until 2021, she was a member of the National Assembly of France, representing the Eure-et-Loir department.

== Political career ==
From 2015 until 2017, De La Raudière was a member of The Republicans. Following the 2017 legislative election, she stood as a candidate for the National Assembly's presidency; in the vote, she lost against François de Rugy.

In parliament, De La Raudière served on the Committee on Economic Affairs. In addition to her committee assignments, she was a member of the French-Estonian Parliamentary Friendship Group and the French-Irish Parliamentary Friendship Group.

In November 2017, De La Raudière co-founded Agir. Under the leadership of party chairman Franck Riester, she has since been serving as deputy chair alongside Frédéric Lefebvre, Fabienne Keller and Claude Malhuret.

== Chair of ARCEP ==
In January 2021, De la Raudière was nominated by President Emmanuel Macron as chairwoman of the Regulatory Authority for Electronic Communications, Postal and Print Media Distribution (ARCEP).

== Political positions ==
In the Republicans’ 2016 presidential primaries, De La Raudière endorsed Bruno Le Maire as the party's candidate for the office of President of France.

In 2018, De La Raudière voted for the use of Glyphosate in cultural process in France.
