= Marleix =

Marleix may refer to:

- Alain Marleix (born 1946), French politician
- Olivier Marleix (1971–2025), French politician, son of Alain
