= Var's 3rd constituency =

Constituency of the National Assembly of France

3rd constituency of Var
- inline Constituency of the National Assembly of France

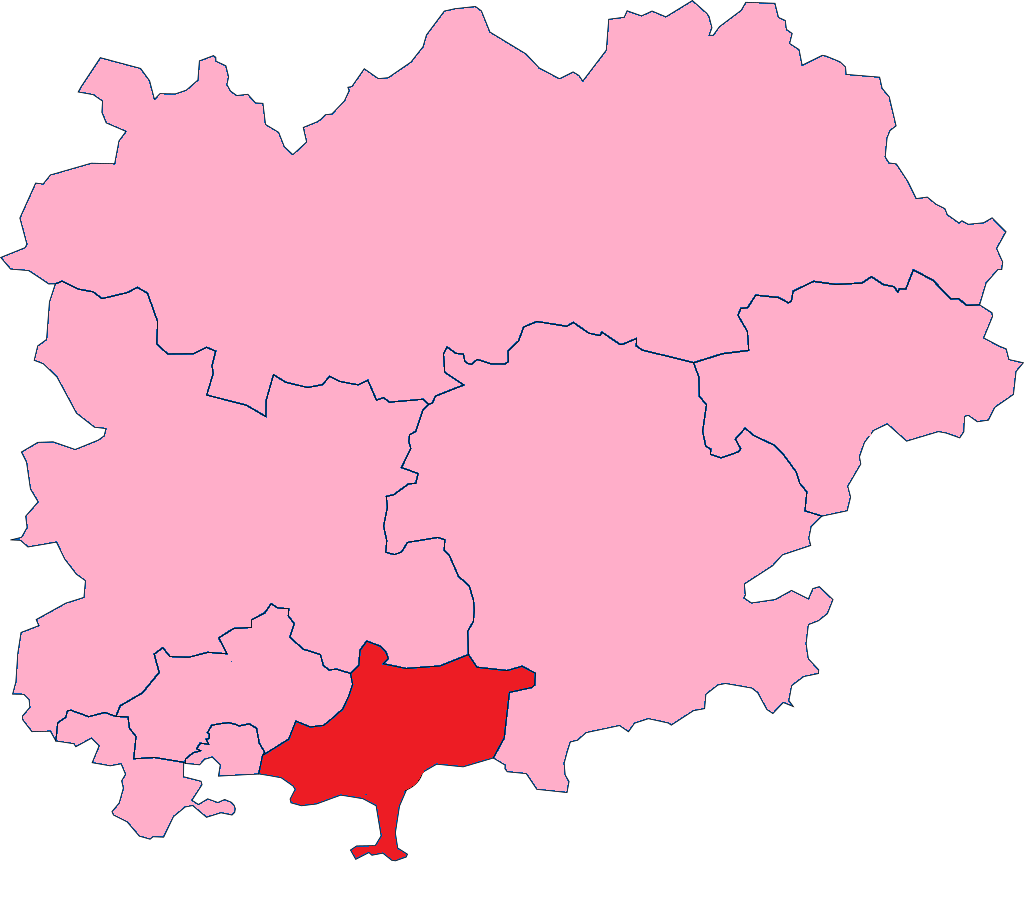
- Var's 3rd Constituency shown within the Var
- Deputy: Stéphane Rambaud; RN
- Department: Var
- Cantons: La Crau, La Garde, Hyères Est, Hyères Ouest
- Registered voters: 100,775

The 3rd constituency of the Var (French: Troisième circonscription du Var) is a French legislative constituency in the Var département. Like the other 576 French constituencies, it elects one MP using the two-round system, with a run-off if no candidate receives over 50% of the vote in the first round.

== Description ==
The 3rd constituency of the Var is centred on Hyères to the east of Toulon.

It has been a strongly right leaning constituency for all of its recent history, including the election of the only National Front deputy in 1988. That winner Yann Piat subsequently joined the Union for French Democracy before being assassinated in 1994.

== Assembly Members ==
Election	Member	Party
1988	Yann Piat	FN
1988	Yann Piat	UDF
1993	Yann Piat	UDF
1994	Philippe de La Lombardière de Canson	RPR
1997	Jean-Pierre Giran	RPR
2002	Jean-Pierre Giran	UMP
2007	Jean-Pierre Giran	UMP
2012	Jean-Pierre Giran	UMP
2017	Jean-Louis Masson	LR
2020	Edith Audibert	LR
2022	Stéphane Rambaud	RN

== Election results ==
=== 2024 ===
Legislative Election 2024: Var's 3rd constituency
Party	Candidate	Votes	%	±%
ÉAC	Charles Malot	1,574	2.26	n/a
RN	Stéphane Rambaud	32,343	46.51	+19.48
DIV	Alexis Dominiak	455	0.65	n/a
DIV	Delphine Rolland	531	0.76	n/a
REC	Odile Judice	1,369	1.97	−6.20
PS	Julia Peironet-Bremond	12,839	18.46	+2.19
LR	Julien Savelli	6,117	8.80	−2.22
LO	Pierre Deidon	259	0.37	n/a
HOR (Ensemble)	Isabelle Monfort	14,057	20.21	n/a
Turnout		69,544	67.34	+19.01
Registered electors		103,272		
2nd round result
RN	Stéphane Rambaud	35,730	53.11	+2.69
HOR	Isabelle Monfort	31,543	46.89	n/a
Turnout		67,273	65.13	+27.33
Registered electors		103,283		
RN hold				

=== 2022 ===
Legislative Election 2022: Var's 3rd constituency
Party	Candidate	Votes	%	±%
LREM (Ensemble)	Isabelle Monfort	13,877	27.78	-6.13
RN	Stéphane Rambaud	13,503	27.03	+5.51
PS (NUPÉS)	Julia Peironet Bremond	8,127	16.27	+2.46
LR (UDC)	Valérie Rialland	5,503	11.02	−12.18
REC	Salomé Benyamin	4,080	8.17	N/A
Others	N/A	4,865	9.73	
Turnout		49,955	48.92	+0.59
2nd round result
RN	Stéphane Rambaud	23,307	50.42	N/A
LREM (Ensemble)	Isabelle Monfort	22,921	49.58	+0.96
Turnout		46,228	47.47	+9.67
RN gain from LR				

=== 2017 ===
Legislative Election 2017: Var's 3rd constituency
Party	Candidate	Votes	%	±%
LREM	Alexandre Zapolsky	16,523	33.91	
LR	Jean-Louis Masson	11,302	23.20	
FN	Aline Renck-Guigue	10,486	21.52	
LFI	Danielle Lapierre	4,267	8.76	
EELV	Chantal Mouttet	1,648	3.38	
DLF	Marie Martin	987	2.03	
Others	N/A	3,508		
Turnout		48,721	48.33	
2nd round result
LR	Jean-Louis Masson	19,570	51.38	
LREM	Alexandre Zapolsky	18,521	48.62	
Turnout		38,091	37.80	
LR hold				

=== 2012 ===
Legislative Election 2012: Var's 3rd constituency
Party	Candidate	Votes	%	±%
UMP	Jean-Pierre Giran	21,278	37.89	
PRG	Joël Canapa	16,154	28.76	
FN	Bruno Gollinisch	13,550	24.13	
FG	Gilberte Mandon	2,395	4.26	
Others	N/A	2,786		
Turnout		56,163		
2nd round result
UMP	Jean-Pierre Giran	24,356	43.41	
PRG	Joël Canapa	19,588	34.91	
FN	Bruno Gollinisch	12,159	21.67	
Turnout		56,103	57.40	
UMP hold				

=== 2007 ===
Legislative Election 2007: Var's 3rd constituency
Party	Candidate	Votes	%	±%
UMP	Jean-Pierre Giran	33,320	51.40	
PS	Mireille Chabot	10,222	15.77	
MoDem	Josy Chambon	4,813	7.42	
PCF	Joël Canapa	4,500	6.94	
FN	Cécile Antoine	4,293	6.62	
DVD	Marie-Christine Hamel	1,924	2.97	
LV	Chantal Mouttet	1,736	2.68	
Others	N/A	4,016		
Turnout		65,861	58.94	
UMP hold				

=== 2002 ===
Legislative Election 2002: Var's 3rd constituency
Party	Candidate	Votes	%	±%
UMP	Jean-Pierre Giran	19,128	30.35	
FN	Philippe de David-Bauregard	13,021	20.66	
UDF	Jean-Louis Masson	10,434	16.56	
PRG	Roland Joffre	7,198	11.42	
LV	Jean-Claude Alberigo	4,451	7.06	
PCF	Joel Canapa	4,103	6.51	
Others	N/A	4,680		
Turnout		64,281	62.14	
2nd round result
UMP	Jean-Pierre Giran	33,453	67.90	
FN	Philippe de David-Bauregard	15,817	32.10	
Turnout		55,400	53.56	
UMP hold				

=== 1997 ===
Legislative Election 1997: Var's 3rd constituency
Party	Candidate	Votes	%	±%
FN	Philippe de David-Bauregard	15,593	26.37	
RPR	Jean-Pierre Giran	13,066	22.09	
PRG	Jacques de Lustrac	7,626	12.89	
PCF	Joel Canapa	6,071	10.27	
DVD	Léopold Ritondale	5,669	9.59	
PS	Roland Joffre*	4,128	6.98	
DVD	Claude Rollandin	2,007	3.39	
GE	Jean-René Cavanna	1,391	2.35	
Others	N/A	3,590		
Turnout		61,505	65.52	
2nd round result
RPR	Jean-Pierre Giran	35,560	64.19	
FN	Philippe de David-Bauregard	19,834	35.81	
Turnout		62,847	66.95	
RPR hold				

* PS dissident
