= Gérard Hamel =

French politician

Mayor of Dreux
- In office 19 June 1995 – 3 July 2020
- Preceded by: Jean Hieaux
- Succeeded by: Pierre-Frédéric Billet

Member of the National Assembly for Eure-et-Loir's 2nd constituency
- In office 2 April 1993 – 20 June 2012
- Preceded by: Marie-France Stirbois
- Succeeded by: Olivier Marleix

Personal details
- Born: 21 February 1945 (age 80) Sourdun, Seine-et-Marne, France
- Party: UMP; The Republicans

Gérard Hamel (born 21 February 1945) was a member of the National Assembly of France. He represented Eure-et-Loir's 2nd constituency from 1993 to 2012 as a member of the Union for a Popular Movement.

== Biography ==
After completing his military service in Melun in 1965 alongside Johnny Hallyday, Gérard Hamel and his wife arrived in Dreux in 1968 from Provins to work in construction. He was responsible for the technical and commercial side of the business and was a partner in the company “Jeunet Bâtiments,” which specialized in heating, plumbing, roofing, electricity, and kitchen and bathroom furniture. The early days were difficult: “In fact, in terms of food, our first six months in Dreux were mainly focused on the art of cooking pasta, because starting the business required a lot of hard work, with my wife providing for our needs.”

Wanting to advance his career, Gérard Hamel took correspondence courses to become a climate control technician. Pierre Jeunet sold him his business. In the early 1970s, he joined the Jeune Chambre économique de Dreux, an association for people under the age of 40 whose goal was to improve economic and social conditions for everyone. Alongside its president, Claude Sallabert, he was part of the association's executive committee.

In 1976, he was elected president of the Syndicate for the district of Dreux, then became departmental vice-president of this trade union chamber, which enabled him to meet local elected officials from the region.

In 1983, he was elected president of the Junior Chamber of Commerce in Dreux, succeeding Dominique Maisons. In September of the same year, he was elected for a four-year term as president of the Eure-et-Loir Building Trade Union Chamber, of which he was vice president, and was also elected president of the Dreux district of the said trade union chamber. At the time, he was apolitical: “For me, a good elected representative had to be worthy of the trust placed in them, and the concepts of right or left were unknown to me.”

Living at the time in Tremblay-les-Villages, near Dreux, Martial Taugourdeau, mayor of the town, asked him in 1983 to stand on his list to become a municipal councilor, which he accepted. Then Martial Taugourdeau, whom he considered his political mentor, asked him to stand in the regional elections on Maurice Dousset's list. He finished sixth, but only the top five were elected.

On April 2, 1993, he was elected representative of the second Eure-et-Loir's 2nd constituency. He was re-elected in 1997, 2002, and 2007. He is a member of the Union for a Popular Movement group.

He is president of the Association of Mayors of Eure-et-Loir (AMF 28) and of the OPH Habitat Drouais. He chaired the board of directors of the National Agency for Urban Renewal (ANRU) from 2006 to 2013.

At the end of 2010, he announced to the press that he was ending his national political career, which he confirmed on December 8, 2011, by announcing his intention not to run in the June 2012 legislative elections. He supported Olivier Marleix, general councilor and mayor of Anet, who was nominated by the UMP and won in June 2012.

However, on November 6, 2013, he announced via his Twitter account that he would be running for re-election in the March 2014 municipal elections.
