= Jean-Louis Masson =

Jean-Louis Masson may refer to:

- Jean-Louis Masson (politician, 1947)
- Jean-Louis Masson (politician, 1954)
