= Stéphane Rambaud =

French politician (born 1960)

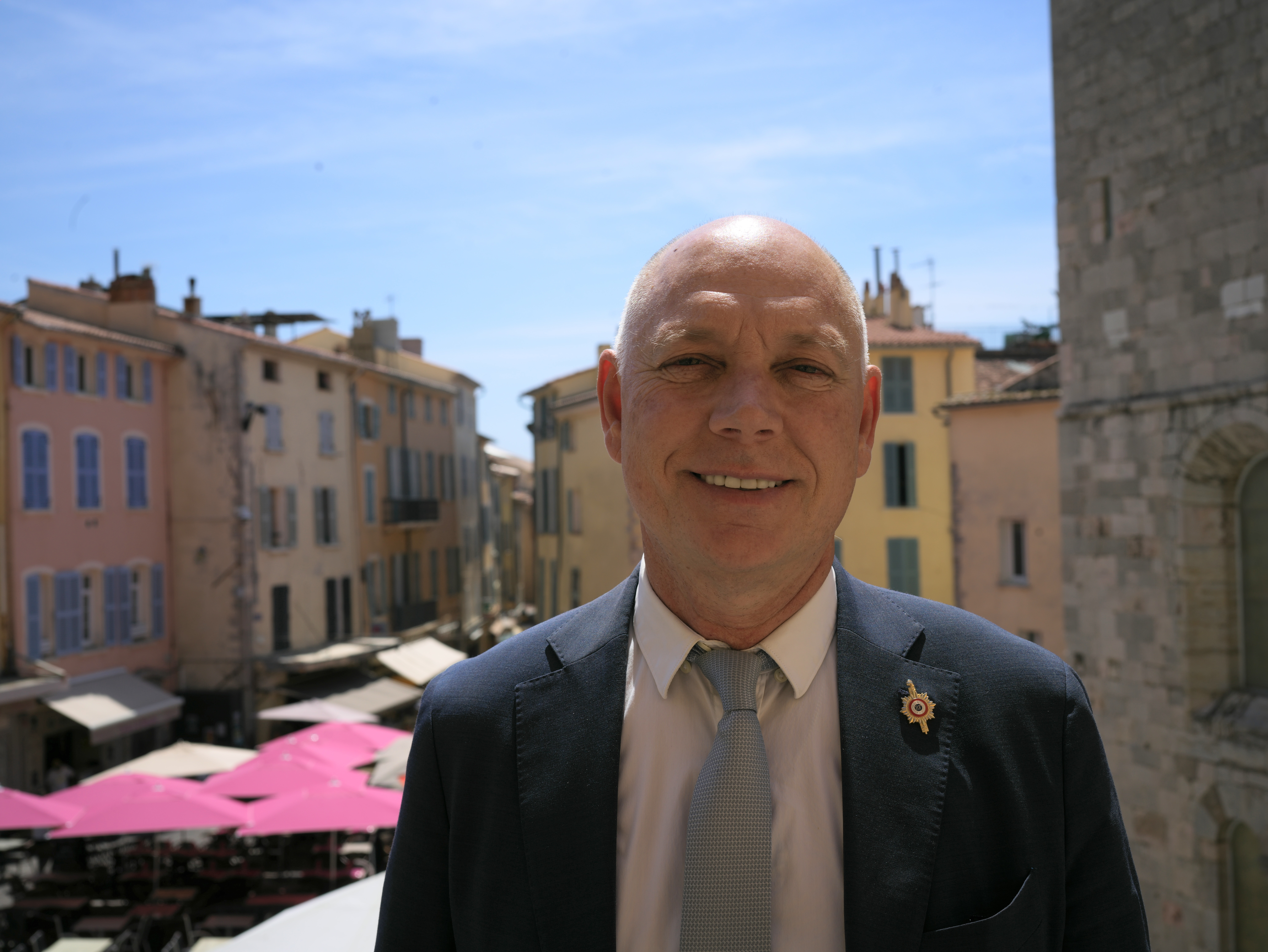
- Rambaud in 2024

Member of the National Assembly for Var's 3rd constituency
- Incumbent
- Assumed office 22 June 2022
- Preceded by: Edith Audibert

Personal details
- Born: 5 April 1960 (age 66) Algiers, French Algeria
- Party: National Rally
- Occupation: Policeman, politician

Stéphane Rambaud (French pronunciation: [stefan ʁɑ̃bo]; born 5 April 1960) is a French politician and former police officer of the National Rally (RN) who has represented the 3rd constituency of Var in the National Assembly since 2022.

== Biography ==
Rambaud was born in Algiers, then in French Algeria in 1960 to pied-noir parents. He continues to identify himself as a pied-noir. He moved to metropolitan France and served as an officer in the National Police for over thirty years.

He was nominated by the National Rally to stand in the third constituency of the Var for the legislative elections of 2022. He came second in the first round with 27.03% behind the LREM Isabelle Montfort against whom he won in the second round with 50.42% of the votes cast.

Outside of politics, Rambaud holds a black belt in judo and is a father to seven children.

== See also ==
- List of deputies of the 16th National Assembly of France
