= Jean-Louis Masson (politician, 1954) =

French politician

Colonel Jean-Louis Masson
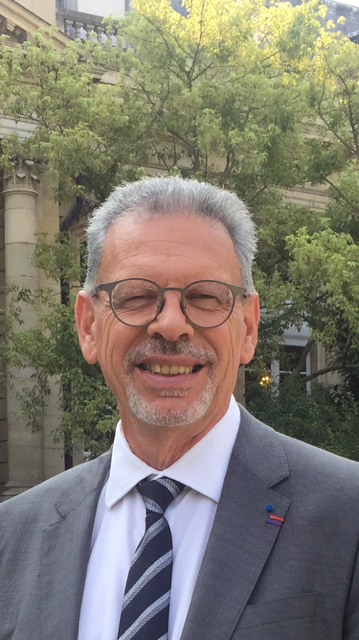

President of the Departmental Council of Var
- Incumbent
- Assumed office 26 October 2022
- Preceded by: Marc Giraud

Member of the National Assembly for Var's 3rd constituency
- In office 21 June 2017 – 2 August 2020
- Preceded by: Jean-Pierre Giran
- Succeeded by: Édith Audibert

Mayor of La Garde
- Incumbent
- Assumed office 3 July 2020
- Preceded by: Jean-Claude Charlois
- In office 25 March 2001 – 31 July 2017
- Preceded by: Yvon Robert
- Succeeded by: Jean-Claude Charlois

Personal details
- Born: 5 February 1954 (age 72) La Garde, France
- Party: Union for a Popular Movement (until 2015); The Republicans (since 2015)
- Other political affiliations: Union for French Democracy (formerly)
- Education: Institut d'études politiques de Toulouse

Jean-Louis Masson (born 5 February 1954) is a French politician and retired Gendarmerie officer who represented the 3rd constituency of the Var department in the National Assembly from 2017 until his resignation in 2020. A member of The Republicans (LR), he has served as Mayor of La Garde since 2020, previously holding the office from 2001 to 2017. Masson has also presided over the Departmental Council of Var since 2022.

== Career ==
Masson was elected to the mayorship of La Garde, Var in the 2001 municipal election as a member of the Union for French Democracy. He was reelected in 2008 and 2014 before resigning the office to take his seat in Parliament in 2017.

In the 2020 municipal election, he returned as Mayor of La Garde, a position his father Louis Masson previously held from 1959 to 1962. Masson was succeeded in the National Assembly by his substitute Édith Audibert.

Masson has also served as a departmental councillor for the canton of La Garde since 2021, previously holding a seat from 2004 (elected under the Union for a Popular Movement banner, later The Republicans) until his resignation in 2017 following his election to Parliament. In 2022, he was elected President of the Departmental Council of Var. He had held the council's first vice presidency from 2015 until 2017 and again from 2021 until 2022.

== Honours ==
Masson was made a Knight of the National Order of Merit in 1992 and of the Legion of Honour in 1998. He was made a colonel in the National Gendarmerie in 1999, retiring from active service in 2000.

== See also ==
- 2017 French legislative election
