= Luc Lamirault =

French politician

Member of the National Assembly for Eure-et-Loir's 3rd constituency
- Incumbent
- Assumed office 22 January 2021
- Preceded by: Laure de La Raudière

Personal details
- Born: 12 May 1962 (age 63) Chartres, Eure-et-Loir, France
- Party: Agir ensemble
- Other political affiliations: Republican (formerly)

Luc Lamirault (born 12 May 1962) is a French politician who has been Member of Parliament for Eure-et-Loir's 3rd constituency since 2021.
