= Cosmetic Valley =

French business cluster

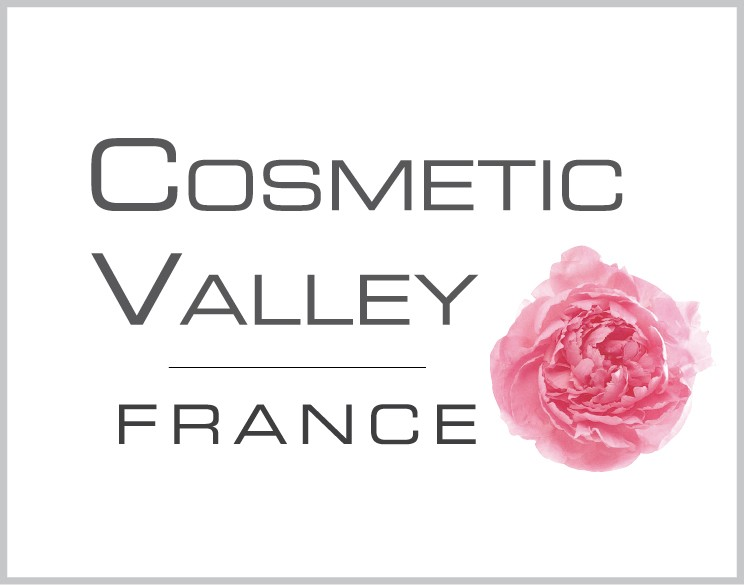

The Cosmetic Valley or pôle cosmétique sciences de la beauté et du bien-être (in English, cosmetic science of beauty and well-being business cluster) is a technopole, the most important French business cluster specialized in the production of consumer goods in the industry of perfumes and cosmetics in France.

== Geography ==
The Cosmetic Valley stretches across three regions and seven departments: Centre-Val de Loire (Eure-et-Loir, Indre-et-Loire, Loiret and Loir-et-Cher), Île-de-France (Yvelines and Val-d'Oise) and Normandy (Eure). The headquarters of the cluster are located on the site of the Chartres Cathedral.

== Main Locations by department ==
=== Eure-et-Loir ===
Eure-et-Loir has nearly 70% of companies in the sector. To department officials, the Cosmetic Valley is an essential element of the attractiveness of the territory, which would particularly illustrated by the introduction of foreign groups such as Reckitt Benckiser, but also small and medium enterprises (SMEs/SMBs) who joined the sector. Cosmetic Valley boasts the creation of over 1,500 jobs in the department in ten years.

=== Loiret ===
- University research : University of Orléans (Orléans-la-Source);
- Companies : Shiseido (Ormes), the center of R&D dedicated to perfumes and cosmetics of LVMH Recherche which includes Parfums Christian Dior, Givenchy, Guerlain and Fresh.

=== Yvelines ===
- Companies: Guerlain at Orphin, L'Oréal in Rambouillet;
- University : Versailles Saint-Quentin-en-Yvelines University.

== History ==
Cosmetic Valley has been founded in 1994 on the initiative of Jean-Paul Guerlain in the region of Chartres. This is the first industrial sector emerged in Eure-et-Loir.

In 2005, the industries of Eure-et-Loir come together with those of the Loiret to be labeled "national competitiveness cluster" under the supervision of the government of Jean-Pierre Raffarin.

The 25th of August 2006, a decree defines the area of research and development of the cluster. Municipalities of the department of Eure, Eure-et-Loir, Indre-et-Loire, Loiret and Yvelines are concerned.

In 2007, stands at Orleans the first edition of Cosm'innov, a convention describing the progress of scientific disciplines in the field of cosmetology.

The second edition of Cosm'innov takes place in March 2010 at Orléans.

== Presentation ==
In the early 2013, the cluster has 800 companies for approximately 70,000 jobs and €11 billion in revenue, seven universities, 136 colleges, 200 public research laboratories for 8,600 researcher, 100 research projects with a budget of approximately 200 million.

Among the major companies represented include L'Oréal (via its subsidiaries Maybelline and Yves Saint Laurent Opium), Shiseido (via Jean-Paul Gaultier, Issey Miyake, Serge Lutens), LVMH (via Christian Dior and Guerlain), Caudalie.
