= Cantons of the Eure-et-Loir department =

The following is a list of the 15 cantons of the Eure-et-Loir department, in France, following the French canton reorganisation which came into effect in March 2015:

- Anet
- Auneau
- Brou
- Chartres-1
- Chartres-2
- Chartres-3
- Châteaudun
- Dreux-1
- Dreux-2
- Épernon
- Illiers-Combray
- Lucé
- Nogent-le-Rotrou
- Saint-Lubin-des-Joncherets
- Les Villages Vovéens
