= Édith Audibert =

French politician

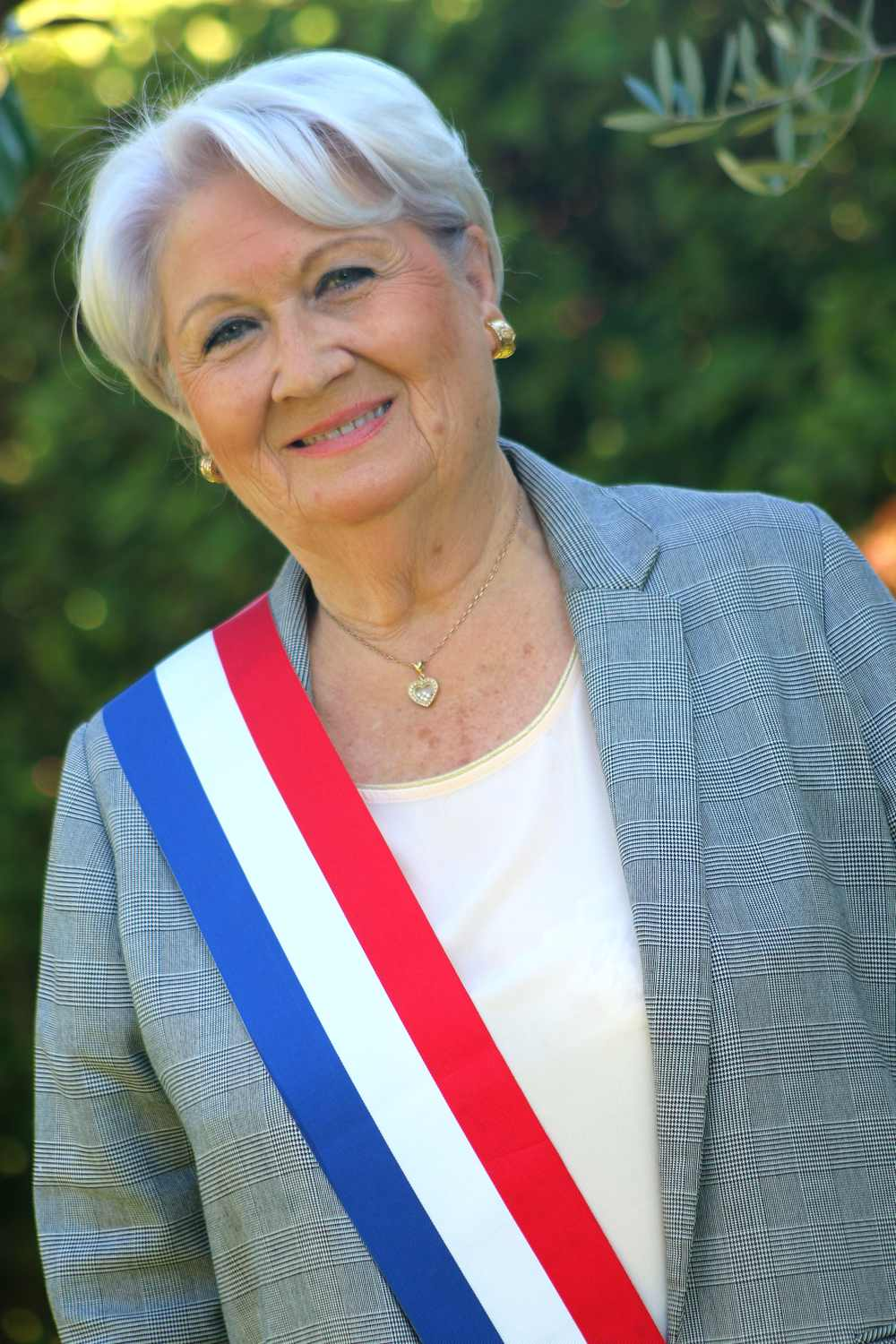

Member of the National Assembly for Var's 3rd constituency
- In office 3 August 2020 – 21 June 2022
- Preceded by: Jean-Louis Masson
- Succeeded by: Stéphane Rambaud
- Constituency: Var

Personal details
- Born: 7 March 1948 (age 78) Hyères, Var, France
- Party: Republican (since 2015)
- Other political affiliations: Union for a Popular Movement (until 2015)

Édith Audibert (born 7 March 1948) is a French Republican politician who became a Member of the National Assembly in 2020, representing Var's 3rd constituency.

On 26 April 2022, she announced that she wouldn't seek re-election in the 2022 election.
