= Departmental Council of Eure-et-Loir =

Departmental legislature in France

Departmental Council of Eure-et-Loir Conseil départemental d'Eure-et-Loir

Leadership
- President: Christophe Le Dorven, LR since 1 July 2021

Structure
- Seats: 30
- Political groups: Government (30): LR (23); DVD (4); LC (2); Agir (1); eurelien.fr

The Departmental Council of Eure-et-Loir (French: Conseil départemental d'Eure-et-Loir) is the deliberative assembly of the Eure-et-Loir department in the region of Centre-Val de Loire. It consists of 30 members (departmental councilors) from 15 cantons.

The President of the Departmental Council is Christophe Le Dorven.

== Vice-Presidents ==
The President of the Departmental Council is assisted by 7 vice-presidents chosen among the departmental councilors. Each of them has a delegation of authority.

List of vice-presidents of the Eure-et-Loir Departmental Council (as of 2021)
Order	Name	Party	Canton
1st	Stéphane Lemoine	LR	Auneau
2nd	Christelle Minard	LR	Saint-Lubin-des-Joncherets
3rd	Eric Gérard	DVD	Nogent-le-Rotrou
4th	Anne Bracco	DVD	Épernon
5th	Bertrand Massot	UC	Lucé
6th	Evelyne Lefebvre	LR	Anet
7th	Herve Buisson	DVD	Illiers-Combray

== See also ==
- Eure-et-Loir
- Departmental council (France)
- Departmental Council of Eure-et-Loir (official website)
