= Patrick Hoguet =

French politician (1940–2021)

Deputy for Eure-et-Loir's 3rd constituency
- In office 19 June 2002 – 3 February 2003
- Preceded by: Jacky Jaulneau
- Succeeded by: François Huwart
- In office 2 April 1993 – 21 April 1997
- Preceded by: Bertrand Gallet
- Succeeded by: Jacky Jaulneau

Personal details
- Born: 23 May 1940 Montmirail, France
- Died: 27 February 2021 (aged 80) Nogent-le-Rotrou, France
- Party: UDF; UMP

Patrick Hoguet (23 May 1940 – 27 February 2021) was a French politician.

== Biography ==
Patrick was the son of politician Michel Hoguet. He was a member of the Union for French Democracy and was elected to the French National Assembly to represent Eure-et-Loir's 3rd constituency, serving from 1993 to 1997 and again from 2002 to 2003. He was also General Councillor for the Canton of Nogent-le-Rotrou.

Patrick Hoguet died in Nogent-le-Rotrou on 27 February 2021 at the age of 80.

== Works ==
- Paul Deschanel. Au-delà de la chute du train. Vrai-faux entretien avec le président héraut de la République (2013)
- 1914-1918 - Les relations complexes entre l'autorité politique et les militaires, Actes du colloque du 3 octobre 2015 à Nogent-le-Rotrou (2017)
