= Arrondissements of the Eure-et-Loir department =

List of arrondissements

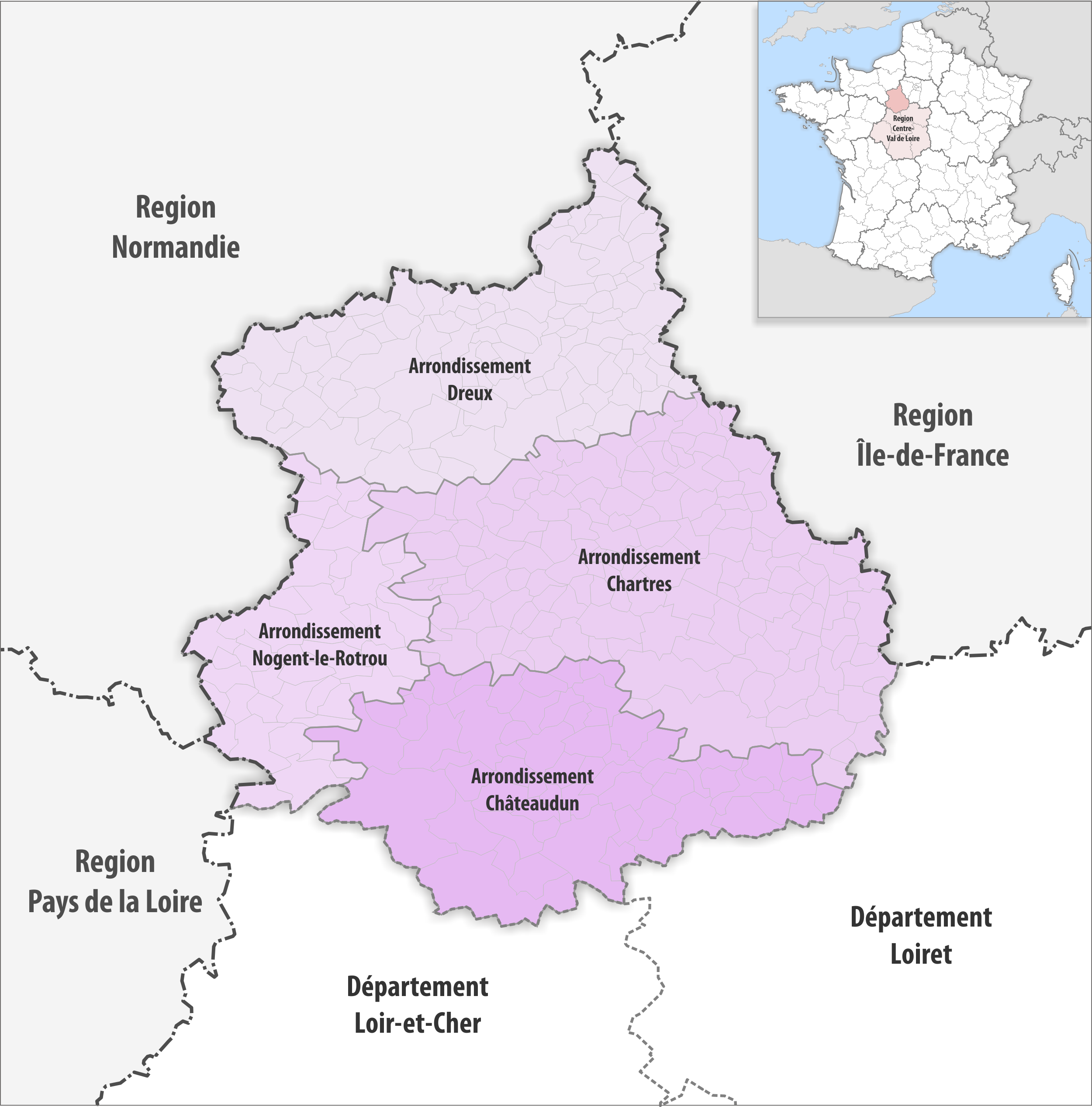
Map of arrondissements of the Eure-et-Loir department.

The 4 arrondissements of the Eure-et-Loir department are:

1. Arrondissement of Chartres, (prefecture of the Eure-et-Loir department: Chartres) with 148 communes. The population of the arrondissement was 209,632 in 2021.
2. Arrondissement of Châteaudun, (subprefecture: Châteaudun) with 61 communes. The population of the arrondissement was 57,387 in 2021.
3. Arrondissement of Dreux, (subprefecture: Dreux) with 108 communes. The population of the arrondissement was 129,336 in 2021.
4. Arrondissement of Nogent-le-Rotrou, (subprefecture: Nogent-le-Rotrou) with 48 communes. The population of the arrondissement was 34,922 in 2021.

== History ==
In 1800 the arrondissements of Chartres, Châteaudun, Dreux and Nogent-le-Rotrou were established. The arrondissement of Nogent-le-Rotrou was disbanded in 1926, and restored in 1943.
