= Eure-et-Loir's 2nd constituency =

Constituency of the National Assembly of France

2nd constituency of Eure-et-Loir
- inline Constituency of the National Assembly of France

- constituency in department

- Eure-et-Loir in France
- Deputy: Christelle Minard; LR
- Department: Eure-et-Loir
- Cantons: Anet, Brézolles, Châteauneuf-en-Thymerais, Dreux Est, Dreux Ouest, Dreux Sud, La Ferté-Vidame, Senonches

The 2nd constituency of Eure-et-Loir is a French legislative constituency in the Eure-et-Loir département.

== Assembly Members ==
Election	Member	Party
1988	Martial Taugourdeau	RPR
1989	Marie-France Stirbois	NF
1993	Gérard Hamel	RPR
1997	Gérard Hamel	RPR
2002	Gérard Hamel	UMP
2007	Gérard Hamel	UMP
2012	Olivier Marleix	UMP
2017	Olivier Marleix	LR
2022	Olivier Marleix	LR
2024	Olivier Marleix	LR
2025	Christelle Minard	LR

== Election results ==
=== 2024 ===
Candidate	Party	Alliance	First round			Second round		
Candidate	Party	Alliance	Votes	%	+/–	Votes	%	+/–
Olivier Dubois	RN		17,908	38.33	+13.83	19,727	42.75	+5.08
Olivier Marleix	LR	UDC	12,109	25.92	-2.45	26,422	57.25	-5.08
Nadia Faveris	PS	NFP	11,956	25.59	+6.94	withdrew		
Florent Mazy	HOR	Ensemble	3,381	7.24	-9.15			
Béatrice Jaffrenou	EXG		535	1.15	+0.08			
Florence Rogé	REC		477	1.02	-1.98			
Adrien Denis	LO		357	0.76	+0.09			
Votes			46,723	100.00		46,149	100.00	
Valid votes			46,723	97.95	-0.35	46,149	96.12	+2.70
Blank votes			723	1.52	+0.29	1,410	2.94	-2.16
Null votes			257	0.54	+0.07	451	0.94	-0.54
Turnout			47,703	63.13	+19.53	48,010	63.52	+22.42
Abstentions			27,860	36.87	-19.53	27,570	36.48	-22.42
Registered voters			75,563			75,580		
Result			LR HOLD					

=== 2022 ===
Legislative Election 2022: Eure-et-Loir's 2nd constituency
Party	Candidate	Votes	%	±%
LR (UDC)	Olivier Marleix	9,124	28.37	-0.75
RN	Aleksandar Nikolic	7,880	24.50	+7.35
LFI (NUPÉS)	Kévin Boëté	5,998	18.65	+1.77
LREM (Ensemble)	Maxime David	5,271	16.39	−12.85
REC	Agnès d'Amilly	966	3.00	N/A
DVE	Sylvie Castro	833	2.59	N/A
Others	N/A	2,093	-	−
Turnout		32,165	43.60	−0.96
2nd round result
LR (UDC)	Olivier Marleix	17,957	62.33	+2.95
RN	Aleksandar Nikolic	10,854	37.67	N/A
Turnout		28,811	41.10	+1.04
LR hold				

=== 2017 ===
Candidate	Label	First round		Second round	
Candidate	Label	Votes	%	Votes	%
Claire Tassadit Houd	REM	9,486	29.24	11,152	40.62
Olivier Marleix	LR	9,447	29.12	16,303	59.38
Aleksandar Nikolic	FN	5,566	17.15		
Jean-Michel Dejenne	FI	3,222	9.93		
Nadia Faveris	PS	1,206	3.72		
Youssef Lamrini	ECO	1,049	3.23		
Marie-France Ceccaldi	DLF	747	2.30		
Vincent Texier	EXD	307	0.95		
Luc Viry	EXG	294	0.91		
Dominique Maillot	EXG	288	0.89		
Hüseyin Karaoglan	DIV	261	0.80		
Jean-Marie Pillet	DVD	233	0.72		
Catherine Valarcher	DIV	208	0.64		
Ludovic Loudière	ECO	133	0.41		
Votes		32,447	100.00	27,455	100.00
Valid votes		32,447	97.99	27,455	92.22
Blank votes		475	1.43	1,726	5.80
Null votes		189	0.57	591	1.99
Turnout		33,111	44.56	29,772	40.06
Abstentions		41,198	55.44	44,548	59.94
Registered voters		74,309		74,320	
Source: Ministry of the Interior

=== 2012 ===
2012 legislative election in Eure-Et-Loir's 2nd constituency
Candidate	Party	First round		Second round	
Candidate	Party	Votes	%	Votes	%
Olivier Marleix	UMP	14,101	36.76%	20,403	53.65%
Gisèle Boullais	PS	12,538	32.68%	17,630	46.36%
Jérôme Van De Putte	FN	6,419	16.73%		
Gisèle Querité	FG	1,578	4.11%		
Jacques Dautrême	UDN	803	2.09%		
Rondro Tsizaza	MoDem	481	1.25%		
Dieudonné M'bala M'bala	PAS	436	1.14%		
Christine Chassaing	AEI	419	1.09%		
Fatima Mention-Karboubi	PR	312	0.81%		
Dominique Maillot	POI	299	0.78%		
Mourad Souni	LGM	287	0.75%		
Mireille Dambrun	DLR	209	0.54%		
Luc Viry	LO	166	0.43%		
Typhaine Rahault	NPA	157	0.41%		
Alain Aripa	MPF	156	0.41%		
Valid votes		38,361	98.41%	38,032	97.04%
Spoilt and null votes		618	1.59%	1,162	2.96%
Votes cast / turnout		38,979	54.17%	39,194	54.46%
Abstentions		32,983	45.83%	32,768	45.54%
Registered voters		71,962	100.00%	71,962	100.00%

=== 2007 ===
Legislative Election 2007: Eure-et-Loir's 2nd constituency
Party	Candidate	Votes	%	±%
UMP	Gérard Hamel	18,662	47.37	+2.28
PS	Birgitta Hessel	8,472	21.50	−2.71
MoDem	Jean-Pierre Gaboriau	4,118	10.45	N/A
FN	Jacques Dautreme	3,061	7.77	−10.76
LV	Françoise Duthu	1,277	3.24	N/A
LCR	Martine Galvin	827	2.10	N/A
MPF	Jocelyne Rigourd	797	2.02	N/A
PCF	Gisèle Querite	788	2.00	−0.29
CPNT	Véronique Genet	637	1.62	−1.37
LO	Vincent Chevrollier	404	1.03	−0.68
PT	Béatrice Jaffrenou	356	0.90	−0.53
Turnout		40,043	57.10	−4.14
2nd round result
UMP	Gérard Hamel	22,120	60.41	−2.13
PS	Birgitta Hessel	14,496	39.59	+2.13
Turnout		38,121	54.36	−1.14
UMP hold				

=== 2002 ===
Legislative Election 2002: Eure-et-Loir's 2nd constituency
Party	Candidate	Votes	%	±%
UMP	Gérard Hamel	17,505	45.09	+17.90
PS	Birgitta Hessel	9,398	24.21	+0.40
FN	François Avon	7,196	18.53	−12.88
CPNT	Marie Dulac	1,159	2.99	N/A
PCF	Gisèle Querite	891	2.29	+2.20
LO	Vincent Chevrollier	662	1.71	N/A
PR	Danielle Bourdier-Aubert	615	1.58	N/A
PT	Béatrice Jeffrenou	556	1.43	−0.66
MNR	Colette Mégret	493	1.27	N/A
DVD	Jean-Manuel Neves	349	0.90	N/A
Turnout		39,657	61.24	−4.90
2nd round result
UMP	Gérard Hamel	21,347	62.54	+6.37
PS	Birgitta Hessel	12,788	37.46	N/A
Turnout		35,930	55.50	−13.75
UMP hold				

=== 1997 ===
Legislative Election 1997: Eure-et-Loir's 2nd constituency
Party	Candidate	Votes	%	±%
FN	Marie-France Stirbois	12,755	31.41	
RPR	Gérard Hamel	11,041	27.19	
PS	Birgita Hessel*	9,671	23.81	
DIV	Dieudonné M'Bala M'Bala	3,145	7.74	
LDI	Michel Barré	1,716	4.23	
GE	Sylvain Sourdain	1,399	3.44	
PT	Béatrice Jaffrenou	849	2.09	
PCF	Gisèle Quérité**	35	0.09	
Turnout		42,069	66.14	
2nd round result
RPR	Gérard Hamel	21,789	56.17	
FN	Marie-France Stirbois	17,000	43.83	
Turnout		44,057	69.25	
RPR hold				

* Withdrew before the 2nd round
** PCF dissident

== Sources ==
- Official results of French elections from 1998: "Résultats électoraux officiels en France" (in French). Archived from the original on 20 December 2011.
