= Yann Piat =

French politician (1949–1994)

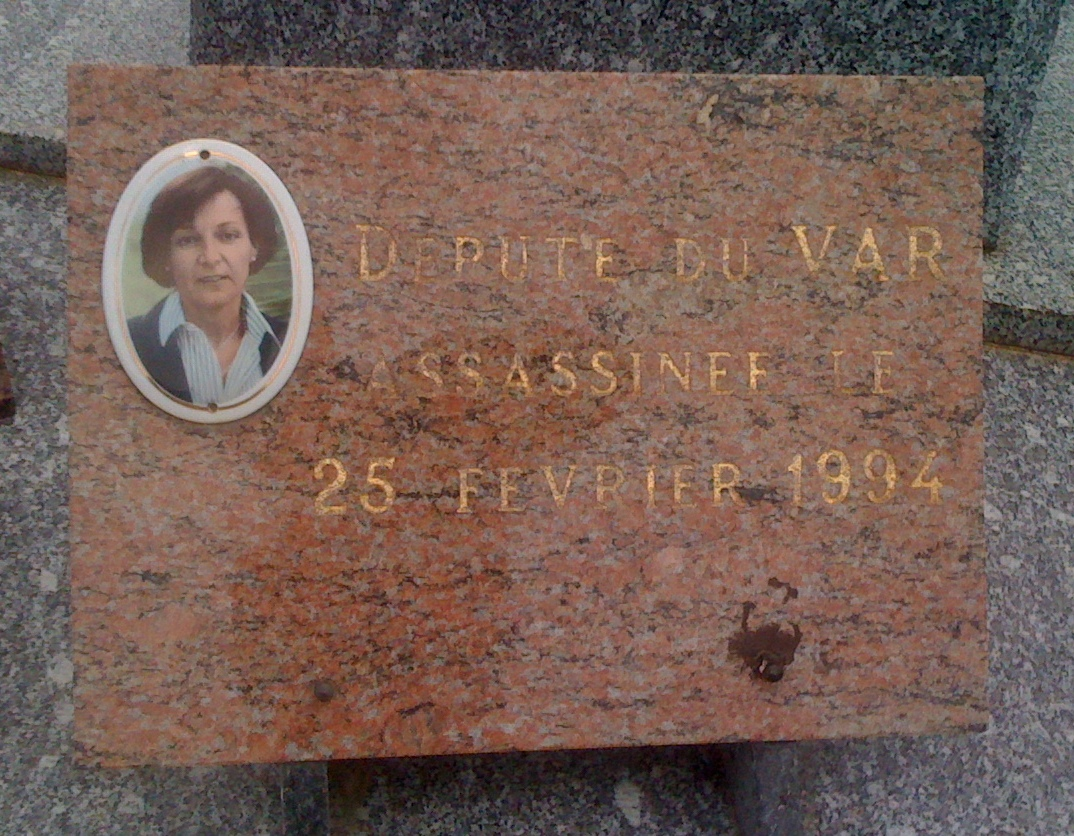

Member of the National Assembly for Var's 3rd constituency
- In office 1986–1993

Personal details
- Born: 12 June 1949 Saigon, French Cochinchina
- Died: 25 February 1994 (aged 44) Hyères, France
- Cause of death: Assassination
- Party: National Front
- Spouse: Philippe Piat

Yann Annabelle Piat (née Marie; 12 June 1949 – 25 February 1994) was a French politician. She served in the National Assembly from 1986 to 1994, first with the far right party National Front, then with the centrist party Union for French Democracy. She was assassinated on 25 February 1994.

== Early life ==
Yann Piat was born on June 12, 1949, in Saigon, French Cochinchina.

== Career ==
Piat started her career as an activist for the National Front.

She served two years as a Deputy (an MP) for Var, one of seven for Var the unique 1986-1988 PR, list-system parliament, and two years later joined the Union for French Democracy by a defection in same year of her next win, after winning Var's 3rd constituency, having been the only member of the assembly for her former party since the 1988 election. She held this seat in the National Assembly at the 1993 polls, under her new party affiliation until her death. She was opposed to the expansion of the Toulon–Hyères Airport.

== Assassination ==
Pair was gunned down by Lucien Ferri, while driving home in Hyères on February 25, 1994.

== Legacy ==
In 2008, the Rue Yann-Piat in Hyères was named in her honour.

In 2012, a TV film directed by Antoine de Caunes and starring Karin Viard as Piat, entitled Yann Piat, chronique d'un assassinat was released on Canal +.
