= Tremblay-les-Villages =

- Commune
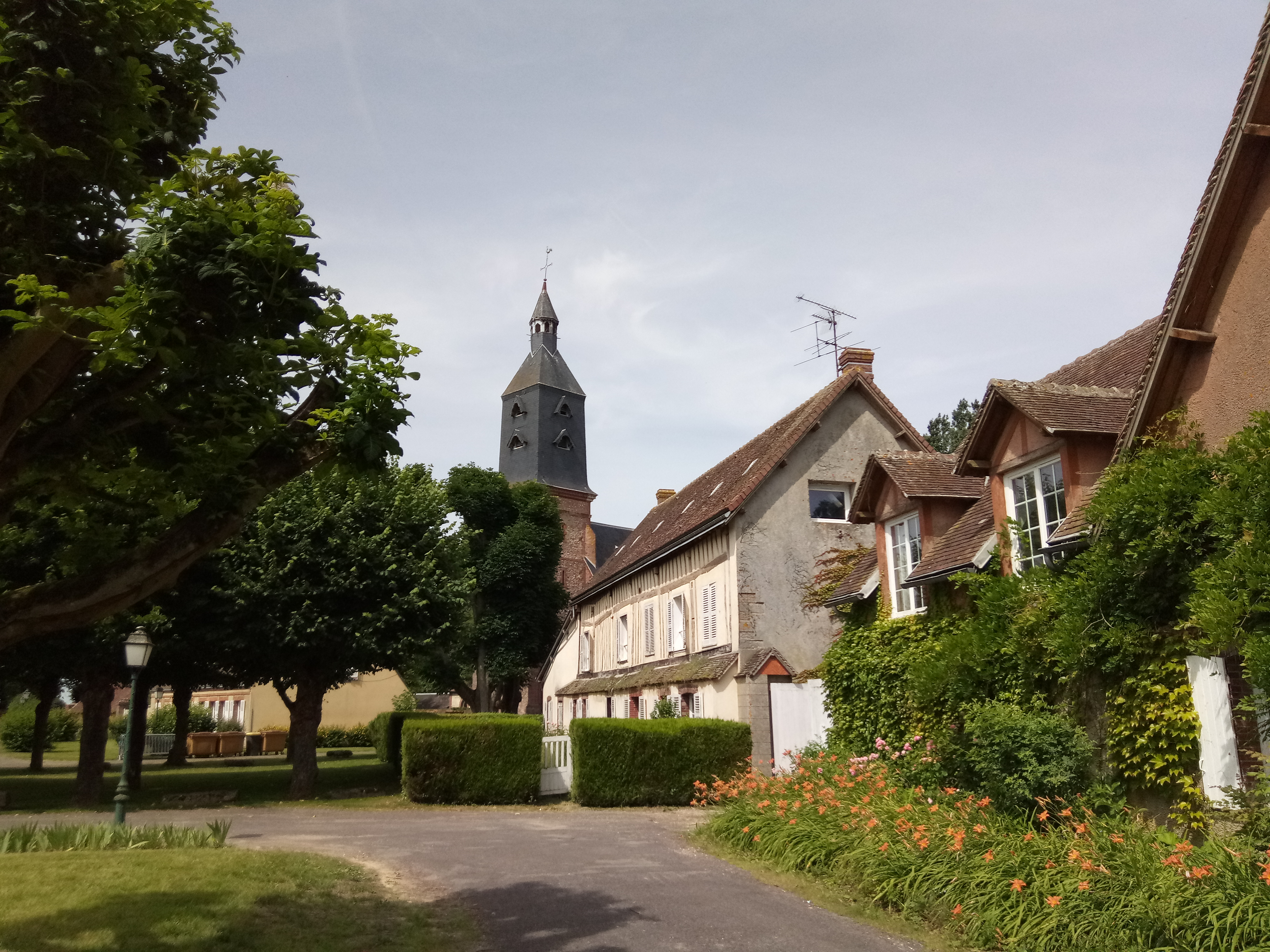
- The church in Tremblay-les-Villages

- Coat of arms
- Location of Tremblay-les-Villages
- Location within France Location within Centre-Val de Loire
- Coordinates: 48°36′06″N 1°22′56″E
- Country: France
- Region: Centre-Val de Loire
- Department: Eure-et-Loir
- Arrondissement: Dreux
- Canton: Saint-Lubin-des-Joncherets
- Intercommunality: CA Pays de Dreux

Government
  - Mayor (2020–2026): Christelle Minard
- Area^{1}: 63.31 km^{2} (24.44 sq mi)
- Elevation: 198 m (650 ft)
- Highest elevation: 227 m (745 ft)
- Lowest elevation: 130 m (430 ft)
- Population (2023): 2,206
  - Density: 34.84/km^{2} (90.25/sq mi)
- Time zone: UTC+01:00 (CET)
  - Summer (DST): UTC+02:00 (CEST)
- INSEE/Postal code: 28393 /28170
- ^{1} French Land Register data, which excludes lakes, ponds, glaciers > 1 km^{2} (0.386 sq mi or 247 acres) and river estuaries.

Tremblay-les-Villages (French pronunciation: [tʁɑ̃blɛ le vilaʒ]) is a commune in the Eure-et-Loir department in northern France.

== Population ==
Historical population
Year	Pop.	±% p.a.
1968	1,212	—
1975	1,036	−2.22%
1982	1,290	+3.18%
1990	1,451	+1.48%
1999	1,816	+2.52%
2007	2,124	+1.98%
2012	2,270	+1.34%
2017	2,271	+0.01%
2023	2,206	−0.48%
Source: INSEE

== See also ==
- Communes of the Eure-et-Loir department
