= Harold Huwart =

French politician (born 1982)

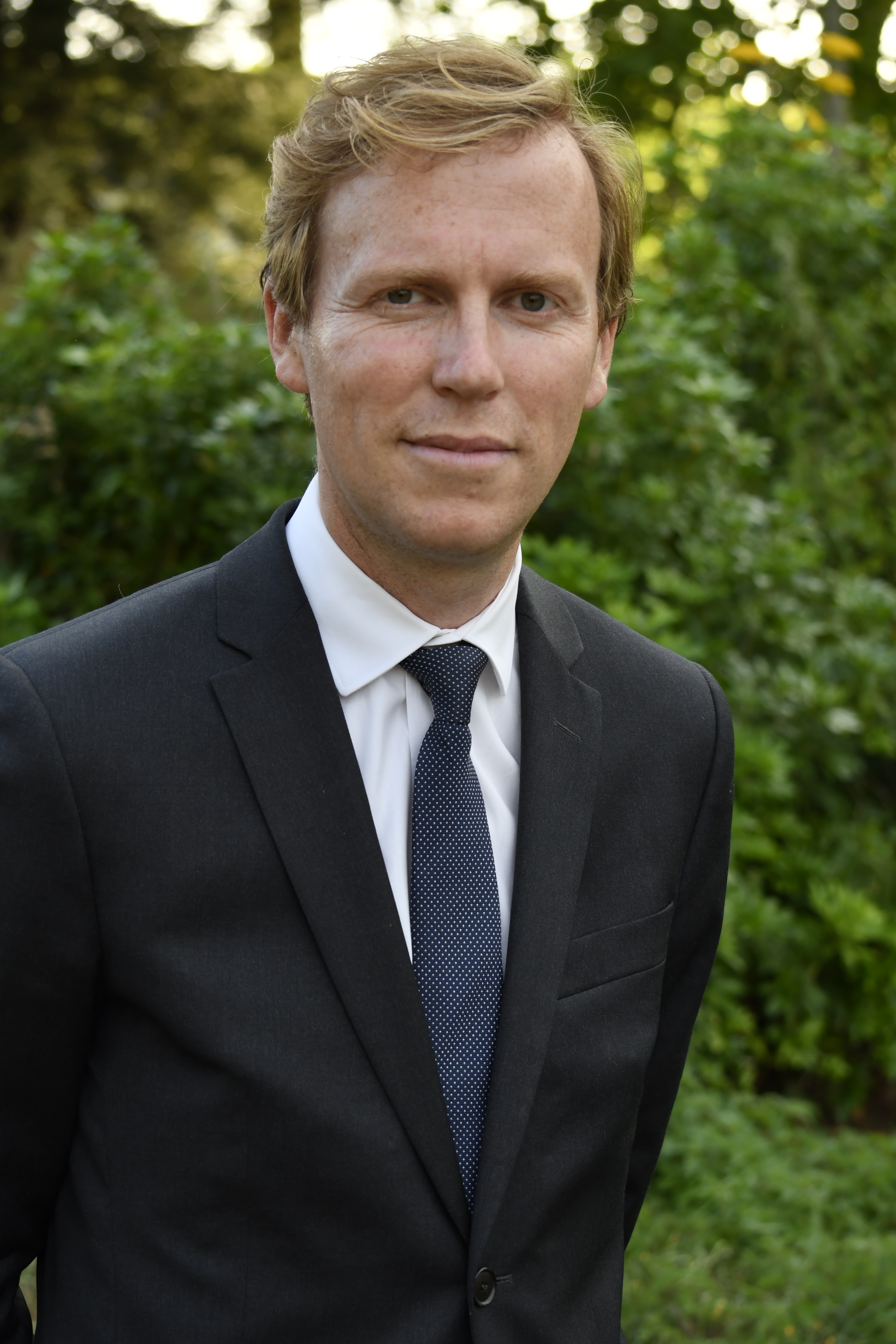
- Huwart in 2020

Member of the French National Assembly for Eure-et-Loir's 3rd constituency
- Incumbent
- Assumed office 18 July 2024
- Preceded by: Luc Lamirault

Mayor of Nogent-le-Rotrou
- In office 3 July 2020 – 24 July 2024
- Preceded by: François Huwart
- Succeeded by: Jérémie Crabbe

Personal details
- Born: 3 January 1982 (age 44)
- Party: Radical Party
- Other political affiliations: Ensemble
- Parent: François Huwart (father)

Harold Huwart (born 3 January 1982) is a French politician of the Radical Party. In the 2024 legislative election, he was elected member of the National Assembly for Eure-et-Loir's 3rd constituency. He was previously a candidate for the constituency in the 2012 and 2017 legislative elections. From 2020 to 2024, he served as mayor of Nogent-le-Rotrou. He is a member of the Regional Council of Centre-Val de Loire, and served as a vice president of the council until his election to the National Assembly.

== Biography ==
Harold Huwart, born in 1982, is the son of François Huwart, deputy mayor of Nogent-le-Rotrou, who also served as Secretary of State for Foreign Trade in Lionel Jospin government.

After graduating from the École normale supérieure (Paris) (2002 L), he went on to study at the École nationale d'administration as part of the Émile Zola class from 2008 to 2010. He also holds a master’s degree and an agrégation in history, as well as a master’s degree in public administration from the Paris Institute of Political Studies.
