= Christophe Le Dorven =

French politician (born 1978)

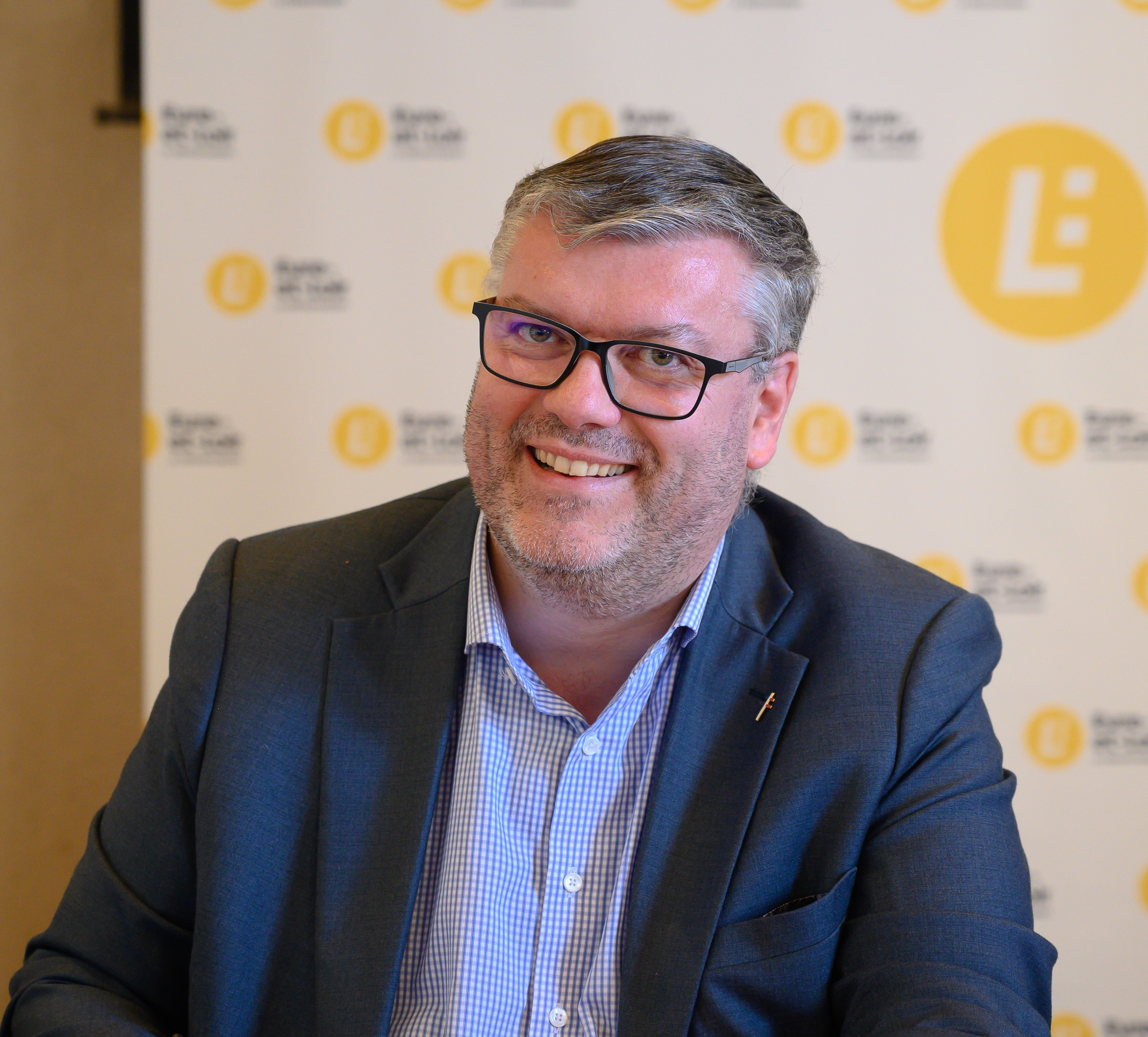
- Le Dorven in 2023

President of the Departmental Council of Eure-et-Loir
- Incumbent
- Assumed office 1 July 2021
- Preceded by: Claude Térouinard

Personal details
- Born: 12 January 1978 (age 48)
- Party: The Republicans

Christophe Le Dorven (born 12 January 1978) is a French politician serving a member of the Departmental Council of Eure-et-Loir since 2015. He has served as president of the council since 2021.
