= Olivier Dubois =

French contemporary dance choreographer

- Born: 1972 (age 53–54); Colmar, France
- Known for: Contemporary dance

Olivier Dubois (born in 1972) is a French contemporary dance choreographer.

== Early life ==
Dubois was born in 1972 in Colmar. After studying foreign languages at the National Institute of Eastern Languages and Civilizations, law and economics, Dubois decided to become a dancer at age 23.

== Career ==
Olivier Dubois has performed for Angelin Preljocaj, Cirque du Soleil, Jan Fabre, Dominique Boivin, Sasha Waltz and many others. In 2006, he was invited by the French Authors’ Society SACD and the Festival d’Avignon to create a piece as part of its ‘Les Sujets à vif’ series. His work Pour tout l’or du monde (For All the Gold in the World) subsequently received the jury prize from the Professional Critics’ Association. At the 2008 Festival d’Avignon, he created Faune(s), based on the famous piece by Nijinski, and won the Prix Jardin d’Europe, the European prize for emerging choreography. His exhibition L’interprète dévisagé (The Faceless Interpreter) at the Centre National de la Danse in Paris and Lyon in 2009 was well received.

In 2010, he presented Spectre, a commission by the Ballets de Monte-Carlo, and created L’homme de l’Atlantique, a duet based on the music of Frank Sinatra, for the Lyon Dance Biennale. In 2009, he started the trilogy Étude critique pour un trompe-l’œil (Critical Study for a Trompe L’Oeil) with the creation of Révolution (Revolution) at the Ménagerie de Verre in Paris, followed by the solo Rouge (Red) in 2011 and concluded by the provocative Tragédie (Tragedy), created at the Festival d’Avignon in 2012. As part of Marseille 2013, European Capital of Culture, Dubois created Élégie (Elegy) for the National Ballet of Marseille. The same year he was named best choreographer at the Danza & Danza Awards for Tragédie and Élégie.

In 2014, he has been nominated by the French Minister of Culture to be the new director of Ballet du Nord / National Choreographic Center in Roubaix, replacing Carolyn Carlson.

In 2015, he created two new pieces: Mon élue noire Sacre #2, a solo for Germaine Acogny, and Les Mémoires d’un seigneur, performed by a dancer from the Company and 40 male amateur dancers.

Olivier Dubois also shares his creations with amateur dancers. In 2011, Envers et face à tous (Against and Facing All) was performed by 120 dancers at Prisme d’Élancourt, followed in 2013 by Origami, which featured 1,000 lower grade and high school students from Roubaix. During the last Nuit Blanche in Paris, he staged Mille et une danses (Thousand and One Dances) with the participation of 300 amateur dancers. Dubois also collaborates with the Ballet Junior de Genève training school. In 2018, he created Audition for them.

The trilogy Étude critique pour un trompe-l’œil (Critical Study for a Trompe L’Oeil) was concluded in 2016 with Auguri, a piece for 22 dancers that premiered at the International Summer Festival Kampnagel in Hamburg and was presented for the first time in France at the Biennale de Lyon. In February 2017, Olivier Dubois produced De l’origine (Of the Origin) for the Royal Swedish Ballet and 7 x Rien (7 x Nothing), his first piece for young audiences.

In spring 2018, he performed a solo titled Pour sortir au jour (Coming Forth by Day), for which the premiere took place at the Festival de Marseille. The following year, Olivier Dubois created a new piece for 8 dancers and one musician, Tropismes, presented recently at CentQuatre-Paris.

He is currently creating his new Franco-Egyptian choreographic piece, Itmahrag, which will be presented in January 2021 at La Filature, in Mulhouse and tour internationally for the two coming seasons.

== Choreography ==
- 2006 : Pour tout l'or du monde
- 2008 : À nos Faunes
- 2008 : Faune(s)
- 2009 : Révolution
- 2010 : Spectre
- 2010 : L'Homme de l'Atlantique
- 2011 : Rouge
- 2012 : Prêt à baiser
- 2012 : "Tragédie".
- 2013 : Elegie for National Ballet of Marseille
- 2013 : Souls
- 2015 : Mon Elue Noire - Sacre#2
- 2015 : Les Mémoires d'un seigneur
- 2016 : Auguri
- 2017 : De l'origine for Swedish Royal Ballet
- 2018 : 7 x Rien (young audience)

== Awards ==
- 2006 Special Jury Award of the Critics Syndicate of France for his interpretation of Peplum by Nasser Martin-Gousset and the creation of "For all the gold of the world".
- 2008 Prix Jardin d'Europe
- 2013 Danza § Danza awards : best choreographer for Tragédie et Elégie
