= Philippe Loiseau =

French politician (born 1957)

Personal details
- Born: 24 November 1957 (age 68) Chartres, France
- Party: National Rally

Philippe Loiseau (born 24 November 1957) is a French politician and a member of the National Rally (formerly known as the National Front). He served as a Member of the European Parliament (MEP) from 2014 until 2019.

He was a FN regional councillor in the Centre region. In 2009, he was selected to be National Front's candidate in Centre region for the 2010 regional elections.
