= L'Écho Républicain =

French daily newspaper

- Type: Daily newspaper
- Format: Tabloid
- Owner: Groupe Centre France
- Founders: Paul Guillon; Adrien Bertholon
- Editor-in-chief: Sébastien Besse
- Founded: March 1929; 97 years ago
- Language: French
- Headquarters: Chartres, France
- ISSN: 0762-2910
- Website: lechorepublicain.fr

L'Écho Républicain (French pronunciation: [leko ʁepyblikɛ̃]) is a French daily newspaper based in Chartres.

== History ==
Originally a weekly newspaper, L'Écho Républicain de la Beauce et du Perche was founded by Paul Guillon and Adrien Bertholon, who sought to create a newspaper to support the deputy candidacy of Jean Deschanel, son of former President Paul Deschanel. Its first issue was published in La Loupe on 30 March 1929. On 8 June 1940, amid World War II, the newspaper ceased publication. Operations later resumed on 13 September 1944, and the newspaper was relaunched as a daily newspaper.

In June 1979, the magazine Le Point acquired a blocking minority stake in the newspaper.
