= Olivier Marleix =

French politician (1971–2025)

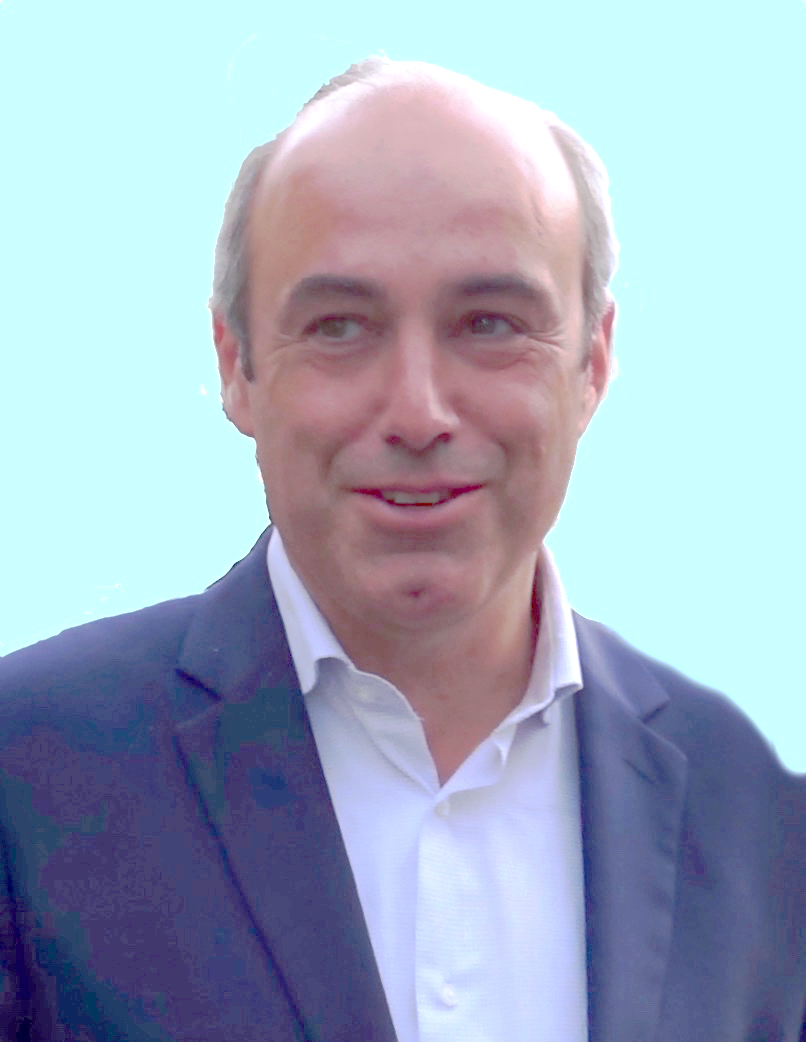

President of The Republicans group in the National Assembly
- In office 28 June 2022 – 10 July 2024
- Preceded by: Damien Abad
- Succeeded by: Laurent Wauquiez

Member of the National Assembly for Eure-et-Loir's 2nd constituency
- In office 20 June 2012 – 7 July 2025
- Preceded by: Gérard Hamel
- Succeeded by: Christelle Minard

Mayor of Anet
- In office 14 March 2008 – 23 September 2017
- Preceded by: Claude Favrat
- Succeeded by: Aliette Le Bihan

Personal details
- Born: 6 February 1971 Boulogne-Billancourt, France
- Died: 7 July 2025 (aged 54) Anet, France
- Cause of death: Suicide by hanging
- Party: Rally for the Republic (1989–2002); Union for a Popular Movement (2002–2015); The Republicans (2015–2025)
- Parent: Alain Marleix (father)
- Education: Sciences Po; University of Clermont-Ferrand

Olivier Marleix (French pronunciation: [ɔlivje maʁlɛks]; 6 February 1971 – 7 July 2025) was a French politician who represented the 2nd constituency of the Eure-et-Loir department in the National Assembly from 2012 until his death in 2025. A member of The Republicans (LR), he presided over The Republicans group in the National Assembly from 2022 to 2024.

== Early life ==
Marleix graduated from the Paris Institute of Political Studies (Sciences Po) in 1992. He also held a Diplôme d'études approfondies in public law from the University of Auvergne, which he completed in 1994.

== Political career ==
=== Career in local politics ===
Prior to his election to the National Assembly in 2012, Marleix was elected as Mayor of Anet in 2008, an office he held until his resignation in 2017 to focus on his parliamentary work. He also held a seat in the General Council of Eure-et-Loir from 2008 to 2014 for the canton of Anet. From 2008 to 2011, he held one of the general council's vice presidencies under the presidency of Albéric de Montgolfier.

=== Member of the National Assembly, 2012–2025 ===
In parliament, Marleix served on the Committee on Legal Affairs. From 2017 until 2018, he chaired a parliamentary inquiry into whether France's government should subject foreign takeovers of French firms to parliamentary scrutiny. In 2019 he indicted Emmanuel Macron, who had signed in 2014 as Minister of Economy the consummation of the Alstom merger with General Electric, to the National Financial Prosecutor's Office (Parquet national financier); only to have it declare a non-lieu.

In addition to his committee assignments, he was a member of the French-Moroccan Parliamentary Friendship Group.

In 2018, Marleix was appointed to the shadow cabinet of The Republicans leader Laurent Wauquiez and tasked with the industry portfolio.

After Christian Jacob's election in October 2019 as party leader, Marleix announced his candidacy to succeed him as leader of the party's parliamentary group in the National Assembly in November 2019; he eventually lost to Damien Abad of Ain.

==== Chair of the Republicans' Parliamentary Group, 2022–2025 ====
Following the 2022 legislative election, Marleix again put his candidacy forward for parliamentary leader. He faced Julien Dive of Aisne, whom he defeated with 40 votes against 20. Marleix took over from acting parliamentary leader Virginie Duby-Muller on 22 June 2022.

Upon his death Christelle Minard took his seat in the National Assembly, as stipulated by her position as his substitute in French electoral law.

== Political positions ==
Technical advisor to the Presidency of the Republic under the mandate of Nicolas Sarkozy between 2009 and 2011. In the Republicans' 2016 presidential primary, Marleix endorsed former President Nicolas Sarkozy as the party's candidate for the office of President of France. In the Republicans' 2017 leadership election, he endorsed Laurent Wauquiez. Ahead of the 2022 presidential election, he publicly declared his support for Michel Barnier as the Republicans' candidate. Ahead of the party's 2022 convention, he endorsed Éric Ciotti as chairman then asked for his resignation two years later, wanting an alliance with the RN.

== Personal life ==
Marleix came from a political family. His father, Alain Marleix, was a former secretary of state and a deputy of Cantal. His mother, Évelyne Marleix, served as the mayor of Molompize from 2001 to 2008.

Marleix was the father of two daughters.

== Death and funeral ==
Marleix was found dead at his home in Anet, Eure-Et-Loir, on 7 July 2025. Paris Match reported that the police had conducted a welfare check at his home after he had missed an appointment with Anet's mayor, Aliette Le Bihan; his body was found hanged in the upstairs bedroom. Marleix's death was deemed a suicide; a scrap of paper found next to him was deemed by the authorities to be irrelevant to their investigation.

His funeral was held on 11 July at Saint-Cyr Sainte-Julitte church in Anet. Many politicians attended, including the interior minister Bruno Retailleau, Prime Minister François Bayrou, and President of the National Assembly Yaël Braun-Pivet. At his friend's funeral Retailleau asked himself: "Nous ne comprenons pas, quels cris Olivier étouffait-il ? Quelle nuit traversait-il ? Pourquoi ? Qu’aurions-nous dû voir ? Quels combats intérieurs livrait-il pour qu’il se résolve à un tel geste ?"

== See also ==
- 2022 French legislative election
