= Jean-Pierre Giran =

French politician (born 1947)

Jean-Pierre Giran (French pronunciation: [ʒɑ̃ pjɛʁ ʒiʁɑ̃]; born 9 January 1947 in Marseille) is a member of the National Assembly of France. He represents the Var department, and is a member of the Union for a Popular Movement. He is the mayor of Hyères since 2014.
