= Eure-et-Loir =

Department of France

- Department of France
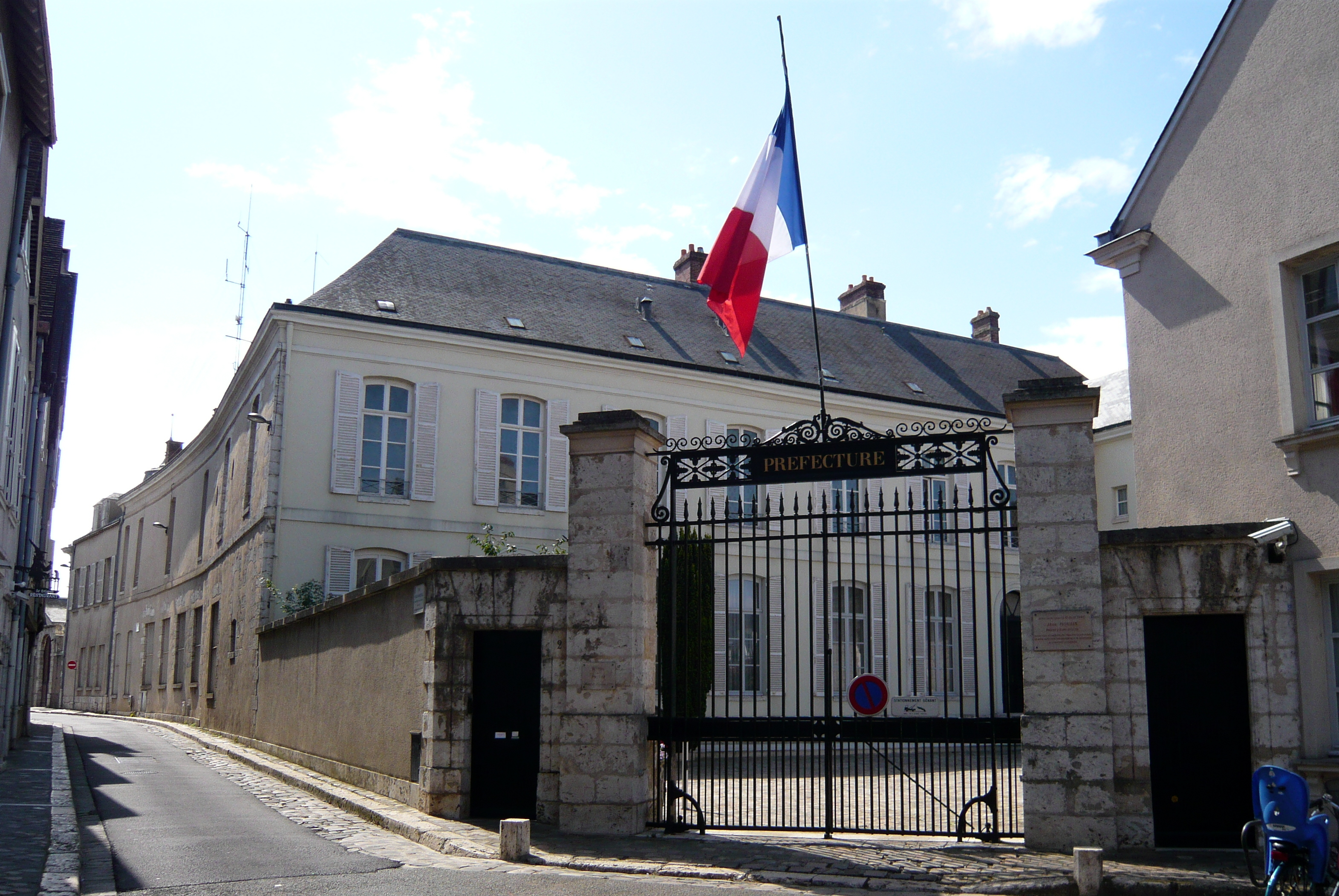
- Hôtel de Ligneris (1795), prefecture building of the Eure-et-Loir department, in Chartres

- Flag Coat of arms

- Location of Eure-et-Loir in France
- Coordinates: 48°20′N 01°25′E
- Country: France
- Region: Centre-Val de Loire
- Prefecture: Chartres
- Subprefectures: Châteaudun; Dreux; Nogent-le-Rotrou

Government
  - President of the Departmental Council: Christophe Le Dorven (LR)

Area^{1}
  - Total: 5,880 km^{2} (2,270 sq mi)

Population (2023)
  - Total: 433,129
  - Rank: 58th
  - Density: 73.7/km^{2} (191/sq mi)
- Time zone: UTC+1 (CET)
  - Summer (DST): UTC+2 (CEST)
- Department number: 28
- Arrondissements: 4
- Cantons: 15
- Communes: 363
- ^1 French Land Register data, which exclude estuaries and lakes, ponds and glaciers larger than 1 km^{2}

Eure-et-Loir (French pronunciation: [œʁ‿e lwaʁ], locally: [øʁ‿e lwaʁ]; lit. 'Eure and Loir') is a French department, named after the Eure and Loir rivers. It is located in the Centre-Val de Loire region. Its prefecture is Chartres, with subprefectures in Châteaudun, Dreux and Nogent-le-Rotrou. In 2023, Eure-et-Loir had a population of 433,129.

== History ==
Eure-et-Loir is one of the original 83 departments created during the French Revolution on 4 March 1790 pursuant to the Act of 22 December 1789. It was created mainly from parts of the former provinces of Orléanais (Beauce) and Maine (Perche), but also parts of Île-de-France (Drouais, Thymerais, Valley of the Avre, Hurepoix).

The current department corresponds to the central part of the land of the Carnutes who had their capital at Autricum (Chartres). The Carnutes are known for their commitment, real or imagined, to the ancient Druidic religion. In the north of the department another pre-Roman people, the little-known Durocasses, had their capital at Dreux.

== Geography ==
Eure-et-Loir comprises the main part of the region of Beauce, politically it belongs to the current region of Centre-Val de Loire and is surrounded by the departments of Loir-et-Cher, Loiret, Essonne, Yvelines, Eure, Orne, and Sarthe.

=== Principal towns ===
The most populous commune is Chartres, the prefecture. As of 2023, there are 6 communes with more than 10,000 inhabitants:

Commune	Population (2023)
Chartres	38,324
Dreux	31,543
Lucé	15,921
Châteaudun	12,830
Vernouillet	12,310
Mainvilliers	10,629

== Demographics ==
The inhabitants of the department are called Euréliens in French.

Historical population

Year	Pop.	±% p.a.
1791	256,636	—
1801	257,793	+0.04%
1821	264,448	+0.13%
1831	278,820	+0.53%
1841	286,368	+0.27%
1851	294,892	+0.29%
1861	290,455	−0.15%
1872	282,622	−0.25%
1881	280,097	−0.10%
1891	284,683	+0.16%
1901	275,433	−0.33%
1911	272,255	−0.12%
1921	251,255	−0.80%
1931	254,790	+0.14%

Year	Pop.	±% p.a.
1936	252,690	−0.17%
1946	258,110	+0.21%
1954	261,035	+0.14%
1962	277,546	+0.77%
1968	302,064	+1.42%
1975	335,151	+1.50%
1982	362,813	+1.14%
1990	396,073	+1.10%
1999	407,665	+0.32%
2007	422,411	+0.45%
2012	432,107	+0.45%
2017	433,233	+0.05%
2023	433,129	−0.00%

== Economy ==
The Eure-et-Loir is a department of agricultural tradition (Beauce), but also at the forefront in three economic sectors :

=== Agriculture ===
The department is a major economic player in the production of grain and oilseed in France. Its agricultural economy is still heavily dependent on the economic and regulatory environment of the markets for crops. The Eure-et-Loir region is the first grain producer of France. It is also the national leader in the production of rapeseed and peas. Wheat production is by far the most dominant in the area. Nearly 40% of all farmland is devoted to the cultivation of wheat, which has generated an average of 29% of the commercial agricultural production of the department over the last 5 years.

The "Pôle AgroDynamic also promotes agriculture in the department", a grouping of subsidiaries providing added values in different sectors: agro-energy, agribusiness, agricultural materials, Agrohealth.

=== Industries ===
- The Cosmetic Valley cluster, around Chartres, which is the most important centre of the French beauty and well-being (perfumes/cosmetics) industry, with big names such as Guerlain, Paco Rabanne, Lolita Lempicka, Jean-Charles de Castelbajac and Jean-Paul Gaultier. The Cosmetic Valley represents 2.5 billion euros of turnover, includes 200 companies, collaborates with the Universities of Orleans and Paris and employs more than 30,000 employees.
- The pharmaceutical industry, around Dreux and the Polepharma cluster. Created in 2002 under the leadership of CODEL Polepharma is a cluster of French pharmaceutical production which includes companies like Ipsen, Novo, Laboratoires Expanscience, LEO Pharma, Ethypharm Famar, Norgine, Nypro, Synerlab / Sophartex and Seratec. The cluster represents 50% of drug production in France and 30,000 jobs. The Pharma cluster is also one of the creators of the inter-regional alliance "Pharma Valley" that has partner networks: Polepharma, CBS and Grepic. This alliance represents 60% of the production sites located in France and 2.5 billion euros of turnover.
- the agri-food industry, promoted by Agrodynamic (rural center of excellence), with two major companies in the sector: Ebly at Chateaudun and an Andros at Auneau.
- woodcraft and furniture industry around the association Perchebois.
- the rubber and plastics industry, through the cluster Elastopole.
- the elevator manufacturer Octé has its head office in Châteauneuf-en-Thymerais

=== Energy ===
The department also has the lead in renewable energy. Already ranked second nationally in terms of power generation through its wind farms located in particular in the Beauce region of Eure-et-Loir in 2012 will be the largest producer of electricity with photovoltaic French original creation on the airbase NATO disused Crucey-Villages near Brezolles in the region's natural Thymerais, the largest photovoltaic park in France. Given in February 2011 by the General Council to the operator, EDF Energies Nouvelles, the park will cover 245 ha of the military base and produce the equivalent output of 160 wind turbines.

== Politics ==
The President of the Departmental council is Christophe Le Dorven of The Republicans.

Party		seats
•	The Republicans, Union of Democrats and Independents, Miscellaneous right	17
	The Republicans	11
	Miscellaneous Left	2

=== Presidential elections 2nd round ===
Election	Winning candidate	Party	%	2nd place candidate	Party	%
2022	Emmanuel Macron	LREM	53.29	Marine Le Pen	FN	46.71
2017	Emmanuel Macron	LREM	60.27	Marine Le Pen	FN	39.73
2012	Nicolas Sarkozy	UMP	53.47	François Hollande	PS	46.53
2007	Nicolas Sarkozy	UMP	58.16	Ségolène Royal	PS	41.84
2002	Jacques Chirac	RPR	79.26	Jean-Marie Le Pen	FN	20.74
1995	Jacques Chirac	RPR	54.27	Lionel Jospin	PS	46.71

=== Current National Assembly Representatives ===
Constituency	Member	Party
Eure-et-Loir's 1st constituency	Guillaume Kasbarian	Renaissance
Eure-et-Loir's 2nd constituency	Christelle Minard	The Republicans
Eure-et-Loir's 3rd constituency	Harold Huwart	Radical Party
Eure-et-Loir's 4th constituency	Philippe Vigier	MoDem

== Tourism ==
- The most important tourist attraction is the cathedral of Chartres, with its magnificent stained-glass windows.
- Church: Saint-Pierre of Dreux, Saint-Denis (Toury)
- Chapelle Royale of Dreux
- Beffroi of Dreux
- Bonneval Abbey
- Castle of Anet, of Chateaudun, of Maillebois, of Maintenon, of Montigny (Cloyes-sur-Loir), of Montigny-sur-Avre, of Charbonnières (Authon-du-Perche), Castle Saint-John (Nogent-le-Rotrou), Castle of Villepion (Orgères-en-Beauce), Castle of Reverseaux (Voves)
- Regional parc of the Perche
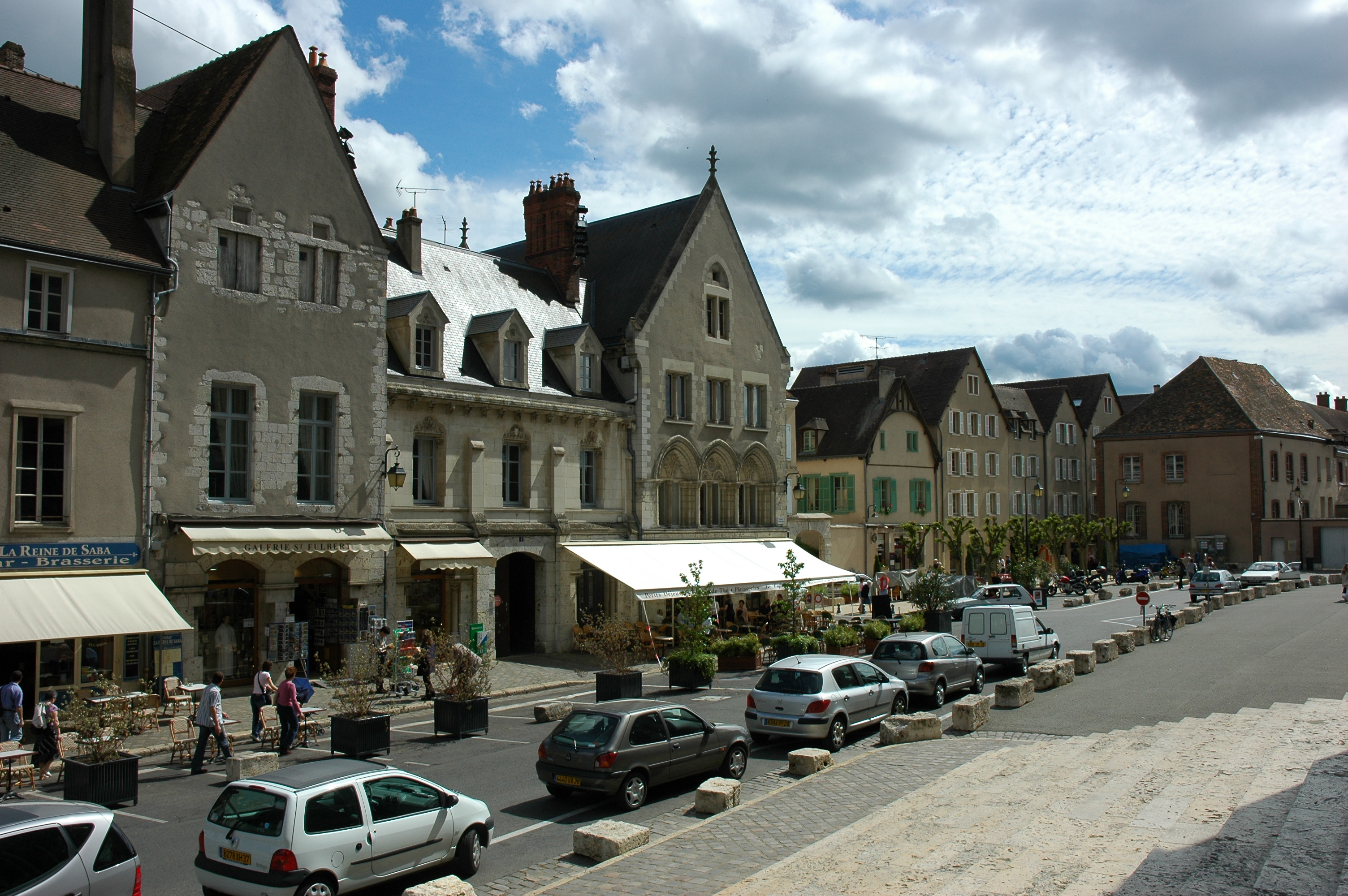
Chartres

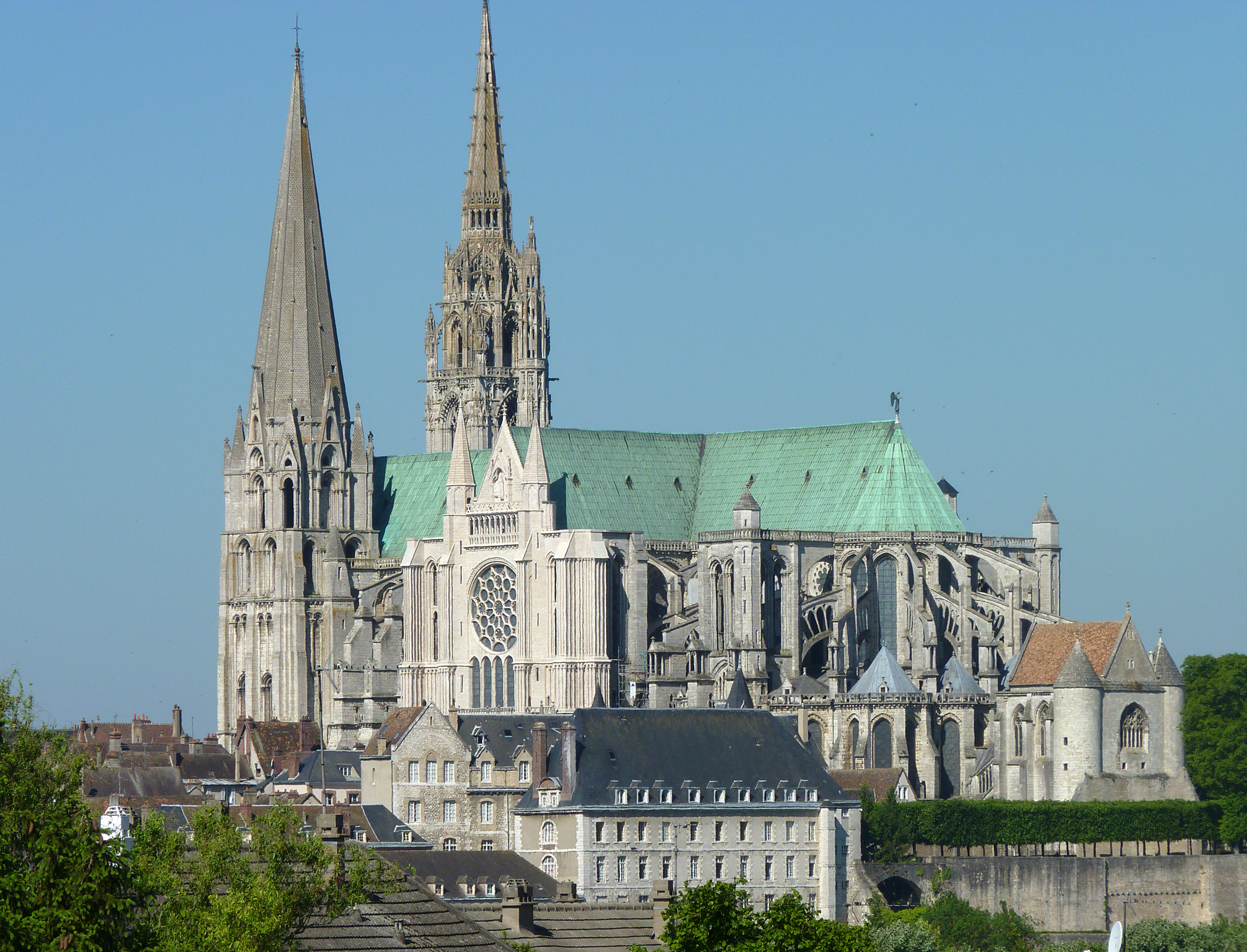
Chartres Cathedral

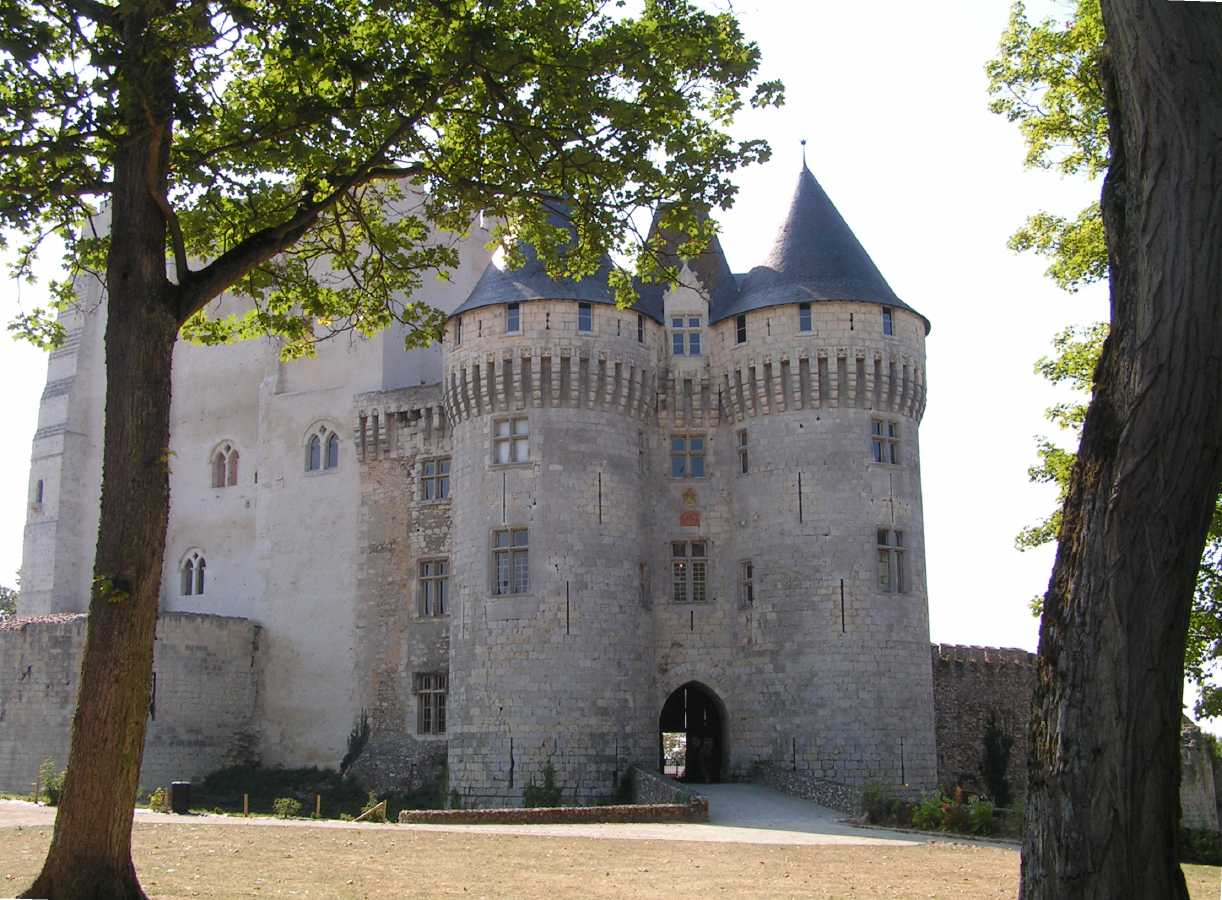
Nogent-le-Rotrou

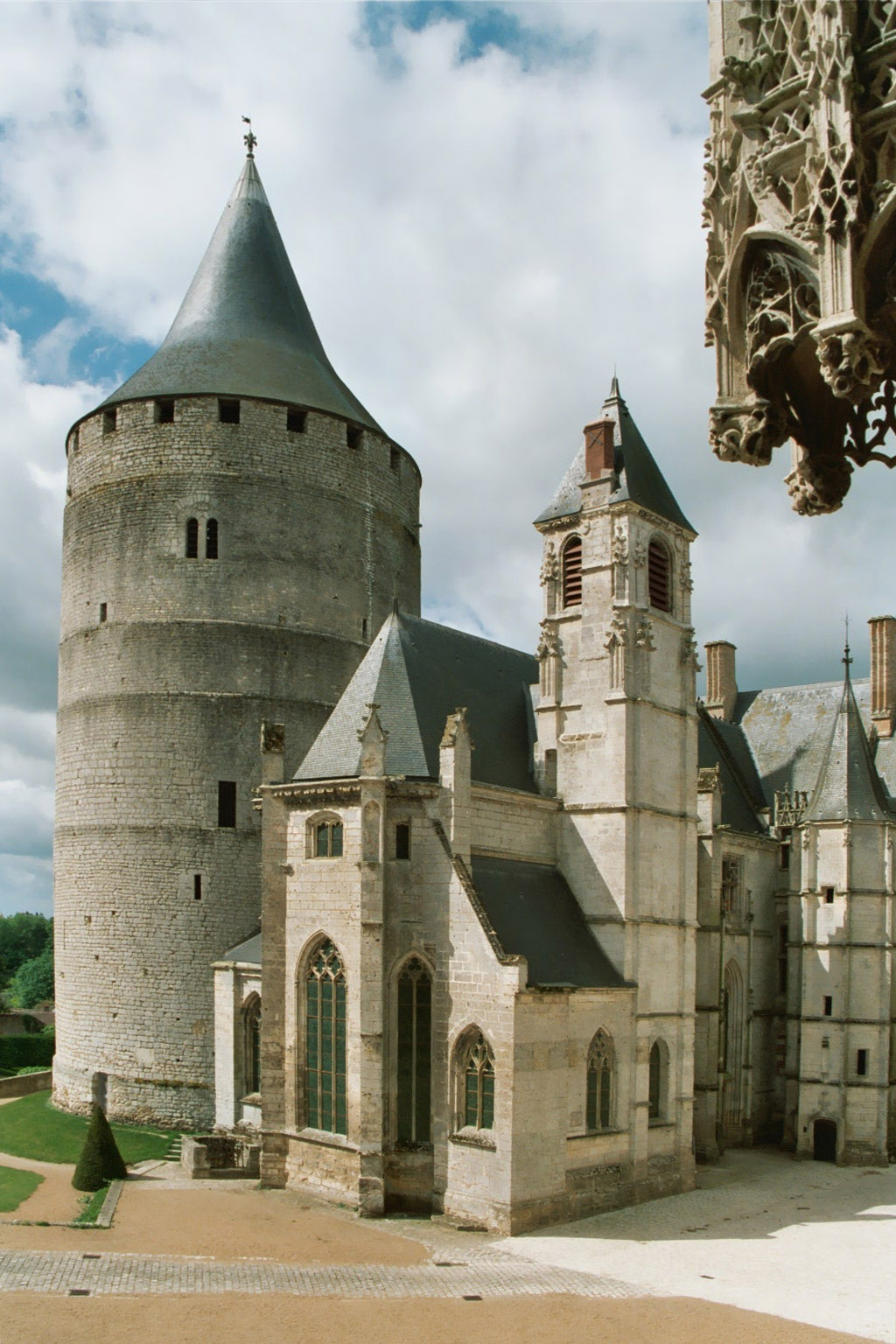
Châteaudun

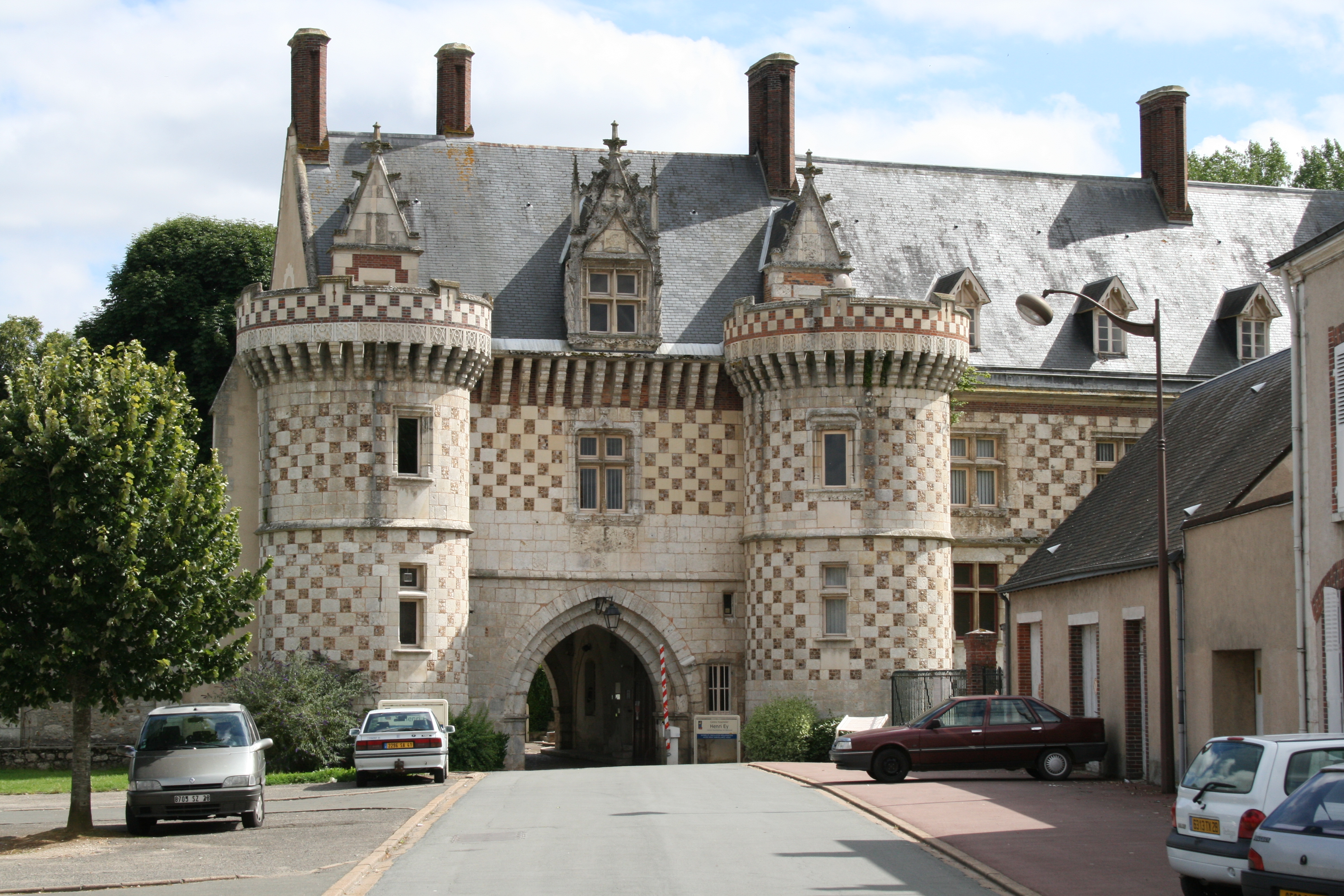
Bonneval Abbey

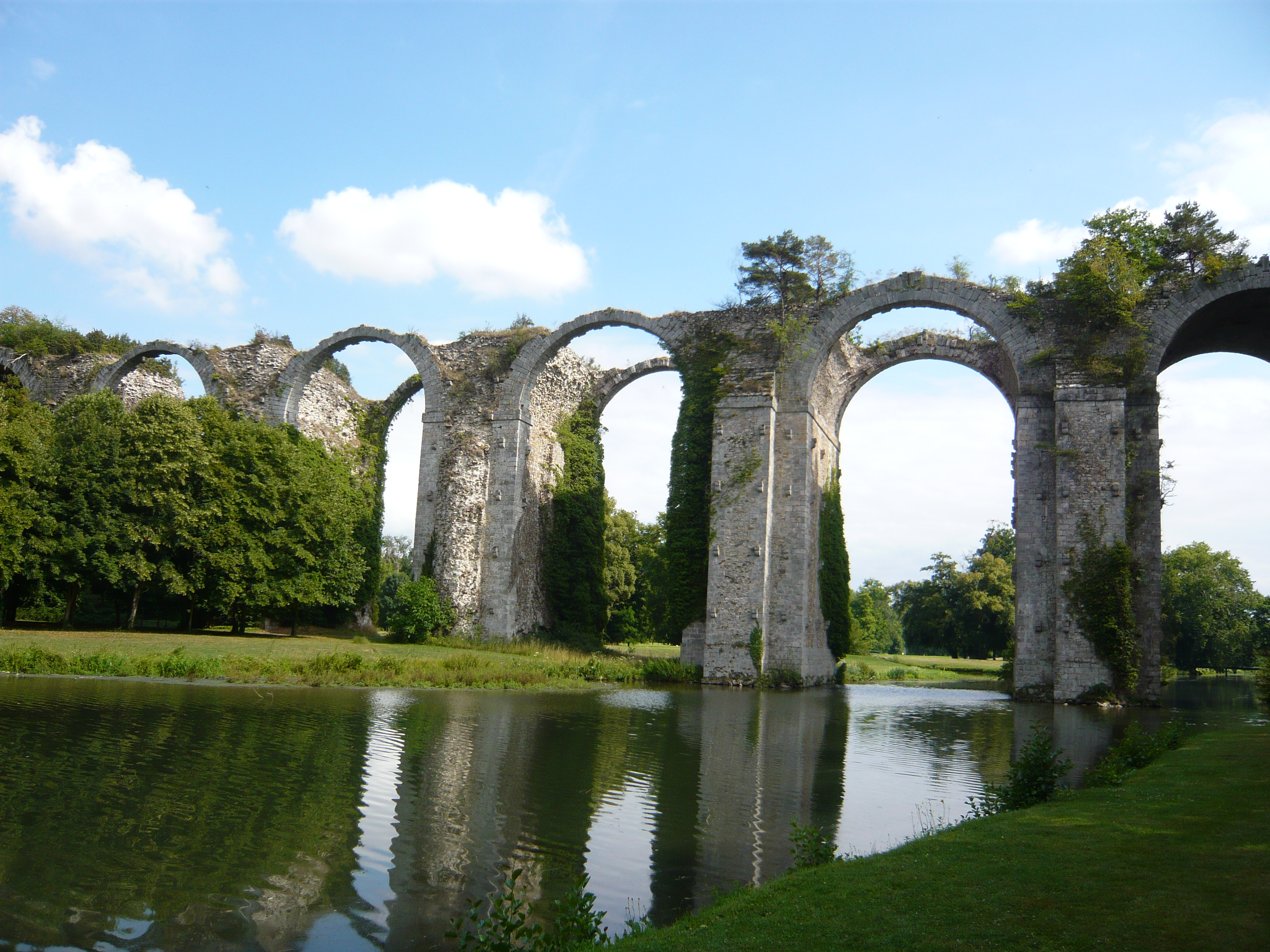
Aqueduct of the Château de Maintenon

== Notable people ==
=== Middle Ages ===
- Hugues Capet (c. 939 – 996), King of the Franks, deceased near Voves
- Fulbert de Chartres (952-970 – 1028), bishop founder of School of Chartres
- Bernard of Tiron (1046 - 1117), founder of the monastic order of Tiron and of the abbey of Thiron-Gardais
- John of Salisbury (1115 - 1180), student of Abélard and of Fulbert de Chartres. British intellectual, friend of Thomas Becket. Bishop of Chartres from 1176 to 1180.
- Philippe VI of France (1293 – 1350), died at the Abbey of Notre-Dame of Coulombs, near Nogent-le-Roi
- Jean II of France (1319 – 1364), who signed the Treaty of Brétigny during the Hundred Years War at Sours, a village near Chartres

=== Renaissance ===
- Joan of France, Duchess of Berry (1464 - 1505), born in Nogent-le-Roi, wife of Louis XII, canonised by the Pope Pius XII in 1950.
- Diane de Poitiers (1499 - 1566), favourite of Henry II of France
- Rémy Belleau (1526 - 1577), poet of the Pléiade
- Henri IV of France (1553 - 1610), crowned in Chartres Cathedral
- Jean Louis de Nogaret de La Valette (1554 – 1642), Duc d'Épernon, minion of Henri III of France.
- Maximilien de Béthune (1559 - 1641), duke of Sully-sur-Loire died at the Villebon château, buried at Nogent-le-Rotrou

=== 19th and 20th century ===
- Émile Zola (1840 – 1902), who was inspired by Romilly-sur-Aigre for his novel La Terre
- Marcel Proust (1871 – 1922) spent time during his youth in the town Illiers-Combray where his aunt lived
- Paul-Félix Armand-Delille (1874 – 1963), bacteriologist
- Chaïm Soutine (1893 – 1943), painter
- Simone Segouin (1925 - ), also known by her nom de guerre Nicole Minet, is a former French Resistance fighter who served in the Francs-Tireurs et Partisans group.
- Lolita Lempicka (1954 - ), fashion designer and perfumer who lives in Berchères-sur-Vesgre

== Media ==
The media in Eure-et-Loir include the following:

- Daily newspapers: L'Écho Républicain, La République du Centre
- Weekly newspapers: Horizon (agricultural journal), L'Action Républicaine, Le Perche, L'Écho de Brou
- Local radio and TV stations: Radio Intensité (Châteaudun), RTV (Dreux), Radio Grand Ciel

== See also ==
- Arrondissements of the Eure-et-Loir department
- Cantons of the Eure-et-Loir department
- Communes of the Eure-et-Loir department
