= List of by-elections to the 16th National Assembly of France =

By-elections to the French National Assembly are held within three months after the invalidation of the election or resignation of a deputy. No by-elections are held within the twelve months of the end of a parliamentary cycle. Eight by-elections were called during the 16th legislature of the French Fifth Republic.

== List ==
#	Dates	Constituency	Outgoing member	Party	Member (re)elected	Party	Reason
1	2 and 9 October 2022	Yvelines's 2nd constituency	Jean-Noël Barrot	MoDem	Jean-Noël Barrot	MoDem	Resignation due to ineligibility
2	22 and 29 Jan 2023	Pas-de-Calais's 8th constituency	Bertrand Petit	PS	Bertrand Petit	PS	Invalidated election
3	22 and 29 Jan 2023	Marne's 2nd constituency	Anne-Sophie Frigout	RN	Laure Miller	RE	Invalidated election
4	22 and 29 Jan 2023	Charente's 1st constituency	Thomas Mesnier	HOR	René Pilato	LFI	Invalidated election
5	26 March and 2 April 2023	Ariège's 1st constituency	Bénédicte Taurine	LFI	Martine Froger	PS	Invalidated election
6	1 and 15 April 2023	Second constituency for French residents overseas	Éléonore Caroit	RE	Éléonore Caroit	RE	Invalidated election
7	2 and 16 April 2023	Eighth constituency for French residents overseas	Meyer Habib	UDI	Meyer Habib	UDI	Invalidated election
8	2 and 16 April 2023	Ninth constituency for French residents overseas	Karim Ben Cheikh	G.s	Karim Ben Cheikh	G.s	Invalidated election

== See also ==
- List of by-elections to the National Assembly (France)
