= Results of the 2024 French legislative election in Pas-de-Calais =

Following the first round of the 2024 French legislative election on 30 June 2024, runoff elections in each constituency where no candidate received a vote share greater than 50 percent were scheduled for 7 July. Candidates permitted to stand in the runoff elections needed to either come in first or second place in the first round or achieve more than 12.5 percent of the votes of the entire electorate (as opposed to 12.5 percent of the vote share due to low turnout).

== Pas-de-Calais ==
=== 1st constituency ===
Candidate	Party or alliance		Votes	%
Emmanuel Blairy	National Rally		38,755	54.08
Philippe Bolet	Ensemble	Renaissance	9,613	13.41
Marie Bernard	The Republicans		9,026	12.59
Jean-Michel Sauvage	New Popular Front	La France Insoumise	6,957	9.71
Jean-Jacques Cottel	Miscellaneous left	Independent	6,637	9.26
Marie Berthoud	Far-left	Lutte Ouvrière	680	0.95
Total			71,668	100.00
Valid votes			71,668	97.27
Invalid votes			715	0.97
Blank votes			1,295	1.76
Total votes			73,678	100.00
Registered voters/turnout			105,247	70.00

=== 2nd constituency ===
Candidate	Party or alliance		First round		Second round	
Candidate	Party or alliance		Votes	%	Votes	%
Alban Heusèle	National Rally		22,239	37.31	25,028	44.16
Agnès Pannier-Runacher	Ensemble	Renaissance	12,838	21.54	31,642	55.84
Alexandre Cousin	New Popular Front	The Ecologists	11,991	20.12		
Nicolas Desfaschelle	Miscellaneous centre	Independent	8,303	13.93		
Mabrouka Dhifallah	The Republicans		2,180	3.66		
Bruno Ladsous	Ecologists	Independent	946	1.59		
Nathalie Leblanc	Reconquête		697	1.17		
Béatrice Bouffart	Far-left	Lutte Ouvrière	409	0.69		
Total			59,603	100.00	56,670	100.00
Valid votes			59,603	97.60	56,670	94.96
Invalid votes			484	0.79	1,045	1.75
Blank votes			981	1.61	1,960	3.28
Total votes			61,068	100.00	59,675	100.00
Registered voters/turnout			88,596	68.93	88,606	67.35

=== 3rd constituency ===
Candidate	Party or alliance		Votes	%
Bruno Clavet	National Rally		25,200	52.40
Jean-Marc Tellier	New Popular Front	Communist Party	15,530	32.29
François Queste	Ensemble	Renaissance	4,427	9.21
Jacques Duquenne	Union of Democrats and Independents (Note: Dissident who ran without the backing of the New Popular Front)		1,586	3.30
Michel Darras	Far-left	Lutte Ouvrière	800	1.66
Michèle Lejeune	Reconquête		546	1.14
Total			48,089	100.00
Valid votes			48,089	97.46
Invalid votes			427	0.87
Blank votes			824	1.67
Total votes			49,340	100.00
Registered voters/turnout			83,041	59.42

=== 4th constituency ===
Candidate	Party or alliance		First round		Second round	
Candidate	Party or alliance		Votes	%	Votes	%
Benoît Dolle	National Rally		25,286	42.34	29,228	49.15
Philippe Fait	Ensemble	Renaissance	18,309	30.66	30,237	50.85
Blandine Drain	New Popular Front	Socialist Party	8,794	14.73		
Clémence Lambert	The Republicans		5,501	9.21		
Jérémy Durand	Miscellaneous centre	Independent	935	1.57		
Dominique Hericourt	Reconquête		445	0.75		
Jérémy Durand	Far-left	Lutte Ouvrière	442	0.74		
Jean-Marc Sergent	Independent		6	0.01		
Total			59,718	100.00	59,465	100.00
Valid votes			59,718	97.41	59,465	95.81
Invalid votes			501	0.82	881	1.42
Blank votes			1,089	1.78	1,717	2.77
Total votes			61,308	100.00	62,063	100.00
Registered voters/turnout			89,963	68.15	89,959	68.99

=== 5th constituency ===
Candidate	Party or alliance		First round		Second round	
Candidate	Party or alliance		Votes	%	Votes	%
Antoine Golliot	National Rally		23,974	43.15	27,176	50.45
Olivier Barbarin	New Popular Front	Socialist Party	16,095	28.97	26,687	49.55
Jean-Pierre Pont	Ensemble	Renaissance	11,601	20.88		
Jean-Luc Viudes	The Republicans		2,596	4.67		
Pierre Langlet	Far-left	Lutte Ouvrière	1,298	2.34		
Total			55,564	100.00	53,863	100.00
Valid votes			55,564	97.85	53,863	94.49
Invalid votes			351	0.62	835	1.46
Blank votes			869	1.53	2,306	4.05
Total votes			56,784	100.00	57,004	100.00
Registered voters/turnout			90,906	62.46	90,922	62.70

=== 6th constituency ===
Candidate	Party or alliance		Votes	%
Christine Engrand	National Rally		32,553	50.70
Brigitte Bourguignon	Ensemble	Renaissance	17,052	26.56
Aurore Pageaud	New Popular Front	Socialist Party	9,065	14.12
Eric Houdayer	The Republicans		4,495	7.00
Laure Bourel	Far-left	Lutte Ouvrière	703	1.09
Giovanni Anthony Frattini	Independent		335	0.52
Total			64,203	100.00
Valid votes			64,203	97.26
Invalid votes			648	0.98
Blank votes			1,163	1.76
Total votes			66,014	100.00
Registered voters/turnout			94,643	69.75

=== 7th constituency ===
Candidate	Party or alliance		First round		Second round	
Candidate	Party or alliance		Votes	%	Votes	%
Marc de Fleurian	National Rally		26,995	47.86	29,282	51.86
Pierre-Henri Dumont	The Republicans		19,036	33.75	27,177	48.14
Jean-Pierre Moussally	New Popular Front	The Ecologists	9,184	16.28		
Olivier Carraud	Far-left	Lutte Ouvrière	701	1.24		
Jérôme Judek	Reconquête		492	0.87		
Total			56,408	100.00	56,459	100.00
Valid votes			56,408	97.91	56,459	96.98
Invalid votes			423	0.73	649	1.11
Blank votes			779	1.35	1,112	1.91
Total votes			57,610	100.00	58,220	100.00
Registered voters/turnout			94,659	60.86	94,682	61.49

=== 8th constituency ===
Candidate	Party or alliance		First round		Second round	
Candidate	Party or alliance		Votes	%	Votes	%
Auguste Evrard	National Rally		27,164	46.45	29,775	52.27
Bertrand Petit	New Popular Front	Socialist Party	18,697	31.97	27,186	47.73
Benoît Potterie	Ensemble	Horizons	9,824	16.80		
Hervé Ruffin	Far-left	Lutte Ouvrière	1,199	2.05		
Alain Atassi	Independent		984	1.68		
Jérémie Weber	Reconquête		617	1.05		
Total			58,485	100.00	56,961	100.00
Valid votes			58,485	97.40	56,961	95.34
Invalid votes			627	1.04	1,013	1.70
Blank votes			934	1.56	1,772	2.97
Total votes			60,046	100.00	59,746	100.00
Registered voters/turnout			92,388	64.99	92,392	64.67

=== 9th constituency ===
Candidate	Party or alliance		First round		Second round	
Candidate	Party or alliance		Votes	%	Votes	%
Caroline Parmentier	National Rally		25,674	48.85	27,318	54.64
Hadrien Coisne	Ensemble	Renaissance	10,394	19.78	22,674	45.36
Estelle Harremoes	New Popular Front	Socialist Party	8,881	16.90		
Hakim Elazouzi	Union of Democrats and Independents (Note: Dissident who ran without the backing of Ensemble)		6,985	13.29		
Anne-Marie Deflandre	Far-left	Lutte Ouvrière	624	1.19		
Julien Guaquier	Miscellaneous right	Independent	0	0.00		
Total			52,558	100.00	49,992	100.00
Valid votes			52,558	97.18	49,992	94.87
Invalid votes			514	0.95	938	1.78
Blank votes			1,009	1.87	1,764	3.35
Total votes			54,081	100.00	52,694	100.00
Registered voters/turnout			80,762	66.96	80,773	65.24

=== 10th constituency ===
Candidate	Party or alliance		Votes	%
Thierry Frappé	National Rally		32,530	60.61
Emmanuelle Leveugle	New Popular Front	Socialist Party	10,085	18.79
Thomas Buttin	The Republicans		5,635	10.50
Léo Luniewski	Renaissance		4,571	8.52
Eric Robaszkiewicz	Far-left	Lutte Ouvrière	851	1.59
Total			53,672	100.00
Valid votes			53,672	96.92
Invalid votes			569	1.03
Blank votes			1,136	2.05
Total votes			55,377	100.00
Registered voters/turnout			89,095	62.16

=== 11th constituency ===
Candidate	Party or alliance		Votes	%
Marine Le Pen	National Rally		32,681	58.04
Samira Laal	New Popular Front	Socialist Party	14,666	26.05
Dorian Lamy	Ensemble	Union of Democrats and Independents	4,269	7.58
Michel Lanoy	The Republicans		2,676	4.75
Dominique Gai	Reconquête		813	1.44
Dominique Gai	Far-left	Lutte Ouvrière	786	1.40
Gautier Weinmann	Miscellaneous left		417	0.74
Total			56,308	100.00
Valid votes			56,308	96.86
Invalid votes			601	1.03
Blank votes			1,225	2.11
Total votes			58,134	100.00
Registered voters/turnout			94,166	61.74

=== 12th constituency ===
Candidate	Party or alliance		Votes	%
Bruno Bilde	National Rally		33,944	59.24
Alain Bavay	New Popular Front	Socialist Party	12,059	21.04
Steve Bossart	Miscellaneous centre	Independent	10,178	17.76
Régis Scheenaerts	Far-left	Lutte Ouvrière	1,121	1.96
Total			57,302	100.00
Valid votes			57,302	96.40
Invalid votes			661	1.11
Blank votes			1,476	2.48
Total votes			59,439	100.00
Registered voters/turnout			96,789	61.41
