= 2024 French legislative election in Marne =

Following the first round of the 2024 French legislative election on 30 June 2024, runoff elections in each constituency where no candidate received a vote share greater than 50 percent were scheduled for 7 July. Candidates permitted to stand in the runoff elections needed to either come in first or second place in the first round or achieve more than 12.5 percent of the votes of the entire electorate (as opposed to 12.5 percent of the vote share due to low turnout).

== Marne ==
=== 1st constituency ===
| Candidate | Party or alliance | | First round | | Second round | |
| Candidate | Party or alliance | | Votes | % | Votes | % |
|---|---|---|---|---|---|---|
| Adrien Mexis | Union of the far right | The Republicans | 17,697 | 37.30 | 18,165 | 39.85 |
| Xavier Albertini | Ensemble | Horizons | 16,058 | 33.84 | 27,419 | 60.15 |
| Evelyne Bourgoin | New Popular Front | The Ecologists | 12,835 | 27.05 | | |
| Vincent Varlet | Far-left | Lutte Ouvrière | 856 | 1.80 | | |
| Total | | | 47,446 | 100.00 | 45,584 | 100.00 |
| Valid votes | | | 47,446 | 97.68 | 45,584 | 94.76 |
| Invalid votes | | | 340 | 0.70 | 558 | 1.16 |
| Blank votes | | | 789 | 1.62 | 1,963 | 4.08 |
| Total votes | | | 48,575 | 100.00 | 48,105 | 100.00 |
| Registered voters/turnout | | | 75,390 | 64.43 | 75,414 | 63.79 |

=== 2nd constituency ===
| Candidate | Party or alliance | | First round | | Second round | |
| Candidate | Party or alliance | | Votes | % | Votes | % |
|---|---|---|---|---|---|---|
| Anne-Sophie Frigout | National Rally | | 17,645 | 36.34 | 19,859 | 41.92 |
| Laure Miller | Ensemble | Renaissance | 14,756 | 30.39 | 27,511 | 58.08 |
| Stéphane Pirouelle | New Popular Front | La France Insoumise | 10,560 | 21.75 | | |
| Stéphane Lang | Miscellaneous right | The Republicans | 3,425 | 7.05 | | |
| Ghislain Wysocinski | Ecologists | Independent | 1,301 | 2.68 | | |
| Marie Pace | Reconquête | | 446 | 0.92 | | |
| Thomas Rose | Far-left | Lutte Ouvrière | 420 | 0.87 | | |
| Total | | | 48,553 | 100.00 | 47,370 | 100.00 |
| Valid votes | | | 48,553 | 98.20 | 47,370 | 95.67 |
| Invalid votes | | | 338 | 0.68 | 552 | 1.11 |
| Blank votes | | | 552 | 1.12 | 1,593 | 3.22 |
| Total votes | | | 49,443 | 100.00 | 49,515 | 100.00 |
| Registered voters/turnout | | | 74,527 | 66.34 | 74,637 | 66.34 |

=== 3rd constituency ===
| Candidate | Party or alliance | | First round | | Second round | |
| Candidate | Party or alliance | | Votes | % | Votes | % |
|---|---|---|---|---|---|---|
| Maxime Michelet | Union of the far right | The Republicans | 21,890 | 43.84 | 25,259 | 50.88 |
| Céline Aycard-Diteste | Ensemble | Renaissance | 15,942 | 31.92 | 24,384 | 49.12 |
| Chantal Berthélémy | New Popular Front | Communist Party | 9,397 | 18.82 | | |
| Johanna Jabbour | Sovereigntist right | Debout la France | 1,219 | 2.44 | | |
| Charlotte Cormerais | Far-left | Lutte Ouvrière | 769 | 1.54 | | |
| Julien Sene | Reconquête | | 719 | 1.44 | | |
| Total | | | 49,936 | 100.00 | 49,643 | 100.00 |
| Valid votes | | | 49,936 | 96.46 | 49,643 | 95.49 |
| Invalid votes | | | 575 | 1.11 | 498 | 0.96 |
| Blank votes | | | 1,257 | 2.43 | 1,844 | 3.55 |
| Total votes | | | 51,768 | 100.00 | 51,985 | 100.00 |
| Registered voters/turnout | | | 78,476 | 65.97 | 78,492 | 66.23 |

=== 4th constituency ===
| Candidate | Party or alliance | | First round | | Second round | |
| Candidate | Party or alliance | | Votes | % | Votes | % |
|---|---|---|---|---|---|---|
| Achille Bisiaux | National Rally | | 21,045 | 42.77 | 23,378 | 47.78 |
| Lise Magnier | Ensemble | Horizons | 15,245 | 30.98 | 25,550 | 52.22 |
| Maxence Laurent | New Popular Front | La France Insoumise | 8,845 | 17.97 | | |
| Gabriel Michel | The Republicans | | 3,249 | 6.60 | | |
| Laurent Gosseau | Far-left | Lutte Ouvrière | 690 | 1.40 | | |
| Marty Ducanda | Independent | | 134 | 0.27 | | |
| Total | | | 49,208 | 100.00 | 48,928 | 100.00 |
| Valid votes | | | 49,208 | 97.46 | 48,928 | 96.06 |
| Invalid votes | | | 442 | 0.88 | 572 | 1.12 |
| Blank votes | | | 840 | 1.66 | 1,436 | 2.82 |
| Total votes | | | 50,490 | 100.00 | 50,936 | 100.00 |
| Registered voters/turnout | | | 77,894 | 64.82 | 77,895 | 65.39 |

=== 5th constituency ===
| Candidate | Party or alliance | | First round | | Second round | |
| Candidate | Party or alliance | | Votes | % | Votes | % |
|---|---|---|---|---|---|---|
| Thierry Besson | National Rally | | 23,954 | 46.99 | 25,947 | 49.57 |
| Charles de Courson | Miscellaneous centre | The Centrists | 21,751 | 42.66 | 26,393 | 50.43 |
| Gaël Padiou | New Popular Front | Socialist Party | 4,774 | 9.36 | | |
| Joëlle Bastien | Far-left | Lutte Ouvrière | 502 | 0.98 | | |
| Total | | | 50,981 | 100.00 | 52,340 | 100.00 |
| Valid votes | | | 50,981 | 98.10 | 52,340 | 98.34 |
| Invalid votes | | | 374 | 0.72 | 254 | 0.48 |
| Blank votes | | | 616 | 1.19 | 630 | 1.18 |
| Total votes | | | 51,971 | 100.00 | 53,224 | 100.00 |
| Registered voters/turnout | | | 75,602 | 68.74 | 75,580 | 70.42 |
