= Pas-de-Calais's 5th constituency =

Constituency of the National Assembly of France

5th constituency of the Pas-de-Calais
- inline Constituency of the National Assembly of France

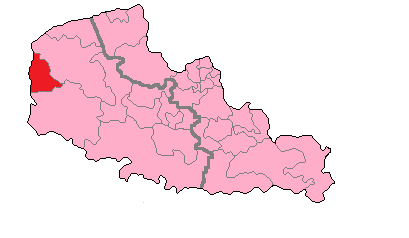
- Pas-de-Calais 5th constituency shown within Nord-Pas-de-Calais
- Deputy: Antoine Golliot; RN
- Department: Pas-de-Calais
- Cantons: Boulogne-sur-Mer-Nord-Est, Boulogne-sur-Mer-Nord-Ouest, Boulogne-sur-Mer-Sud, Outreau, Le Portel, Samer
- Registered voters: 89,827

The 5th constituency of the Pas-de-Calais is a French legislative constituency in the Pas-de-Calais département.

== Description ==
Pas-de-Calais' 5th constituency consists of the port of Boulogne-sur-Mer and its surrounding hinterland. The seat was radically altered as a result of 2010 redistricting of French legislative constituencies so that it included the whole of Boulogne-sur-Mer rather than just its southern parts as had been the case since 1988.

The seat elected Frédéric Cuvillier in the 1st round of the 2012 election suggesting that the seat was considered as safe for his party the PS. However, LREM gained the seat in 2017 as the PS vote collapsed across France.

== Historic Representation ==
Election	Member	Party
1986	Proportional representation - no election by constituency	
1988	Guy Lengagne	PS
1993	Jean-Pierre Pont	UDF
1997	Guy Lengagne	PS
2002	Guy Lengagne	PS
2007	Frédéric Cuvillier	PS
2012	Frédéric Cuvillier	PS
2012	Thérèse Guilbert	PS
2014	Frédéric Cuvillier	PS
2017	Jean-Pierre Pont	LREM
2022	Jean-Pierre Pont	RE
2024	Antoine Golliot	RN

== Election results ==
=== 2024 ===
Candidate	Party	Alliance	First round			Second round		
Candidate	Party	Alliance	Votes	%	+/–	Votes	%	+/–
Antoine Golliot	RN		23,974	43.15	+16.29	27,176	50.45	+1.48
Olivier Barbarin	PS	NFP	16,095	28.97	+10.94	26,687	49.55	new
Jean-Pierre Pont	RE	Ensemble	11,601	20.88	-4.05	withdrew		
Jean-Luc Viudes	LR	UDC	2,596	4.67	new			
Pierre Langlet	LO		1,298	2.34	+0.67			
Votes			55,564	100.00		53,863	100.00	
Valid votes			55,564	97.85	-0.16	53,863	94.49	+3.20
Blank votes			869	1.53	+0.21	2,306	4.05	-1.99
Null votes			351	0.62	-0.05	835	1.46	-1.22
Turnout			56,784	62.46	+17.62	57,004	62.70	+19.81
Abstentions			34,122	37.54	-17.62	33,918	37.30	-19.81
Registered voters			90,906			90,922		
Result			RN GAIN FROM RE					

=== 2022 ===
Legislative Election 2022: Pas-de-Calais's 5th constituency
Party	Candidate	Votes	%	±%
RN	Antoine Golliot	10,691	26.86	+5.73
LREM (Ensemble)	Jean-Pierre Pont	9,923	24.93	-6.67
PS	Mireille Hingrez-Cereda*	7,295	18.32	N/A
LFI (NUPÉS)	Nancy Bélart	7,179	18.03	−13.32
LR (UDC)	Géraldine Delbart	1,461	3.67	−6.37
PA	Christophe Blanckaert	1,426	3.67	N/A
REC	Emeline Lucien	1,172	2.94	N/A
LO	Olivier Carraud	663	1.67	N/A
Turnout		39,810	44.84	−2.54
2nd round result
LREM (Ensemble)	Jean-Pierre Pont	18,102	51.03	-10.00
RN	Antoine Golliot	17,370	48.97	+10.00
Turnout		35,472	42.89	+1.28
LREM hold				

* PS dissident

=== 2017 ===
Candidate	Label	First round		Second round	
Candidate	Label	Votes	%	Votes	%
Jean-Pierre Pont	REM	13,145	31.60	20,515	61.03
Antoine Golliot	FN	8,789	21.13	13,101	38.97
Alain Berthault	FI	5,776	13.88		
Mireille Hingrez-Céréda	PS	4,400	10.58		
Fabienne Chochois	LR	4,176	10.04		
David Gobe	PCF	1,446	3.48		
Cindy Pacques	ECO	1,418	3.41		
Jacques Lannoy	DVD	881	2.12		
Vincent Magniez	EXG	536	1.29		
Hervé Krych	DIV	398	0.96		
Philippe Morbidelli	DVG	265	0.64		
Malika Hamiani	ECO	205	0.49		
Lilia Ounas	DIV	166	0.40		
Votes		41,601	100.00	33,616	100.00
Valid votes		41,601	97.42	33,616	89.64
Blank votes		717	1.68	2,708	7.22
Null votes		385	0.90	1,176	3.14
Turnout		42,703	47.38	37,500	41.61
Abstentions		47,422	52.62	52,616	58.39
Registered voters		90,125		90,116	
Source: Ministry of the Interior

=== 2012 ===
Legislative Election 2012: Pas-de-Calais' 5th constituency 1st Round
Party	Candidate	Votes	%	±%
PS	Frédéric Cuvillier	25,202	50.66	+11.31
NM	Laurent Feutry	11,980	24.08	+9.74
FN	Antoine Golliot	7,325	8.15	+4.30
FG	Brigitte Passebosc	3,189	6.41	+0.75
LV	Fanny Puppinck	1,188	2.39	N/A
LO	Nicolas Fournier	500	1.01	N/A
AEI	Malika Hamiani	322	0.65	N/A
DIV	Malick Zeghdoudi	44	0.09	N/A
Turnout		50,634	56.37	−4.56
PS hold		Swing		

=== 2007 ===
Legislative Election 2007: Pas-de-Calais's 5th constituency
Party	Candidate	Votes	%	±%
PS	Frédéric Cuvillier	15,261	39.35	
UMP	Annick Valla	7,446	19.20	
NM	Laurent Feutry	5,562	14.34	
DVD	Jean-Pierre Pont	3,564	9.19	
PCF	Brigitte Passebosc	2,197	5.66	
FN	Monique Sgard	1,494	3.85	
Far left	Philippe Herenguel	982	2.53	
Others	N/A	2,277		
Turnout		39,524	60.93	
2nd round result
PS	Frédéric Cuvillier	23,315	62.04	
UMP	Annick Valla	14,266	37.96	
Turnout		39,199	60.43	
PS gain from DVG				

=== 2002 ===
Legislative Election 2002: Pas-de-Calais's 5th constituency
Party	Candidate	Votes	%	±%
DVG	Guy Lengagne	11,062	29.64	
UMP	Jean-Pierre Pont	7,996	21.42	
UDF	Laurent Feutry	6,750	18.08	
PCF	Jean-Claude Juda	3,495	9.36	
FN	Monique Sgard	3,476	9.31	
CPNT	Daniele Nuttens	803	2.15	
Others	N/A	4,545		
Turnout		38,265	60.72	
2nd round result
DVG	Guy Lengagne	17,723	50.81	
UMP	Jean-Pierre Pont	17,155	49.19	
Turnout		36,952	58.64	
DVG hold				

=== 1997 ===
Legislative Election 1997: Pas-de-Calais's 5th constituency
Party	Candidate	Votes	%	±%
UDF	Jean-Pierre Pont	9,823	25.03	
DVG	Guy Lengagne	8,167	20.81	
PS	Thérèse Guilbert	6,930	17.66	
PCF	Jean-Claude Juda	5,928	15.10	
FN	Guy Molliens	4,269	10.88	
LO	Marc Benard	1,352	3.44	
LV	Pierre Géneau	1,307	3.33	
DVD	Typhaine de Penfentenyo	956	2.44	
Others	N/A	516		
Turnout		42,706	67.32	
2nd round result
DVG	Guy Lengagne	22,767	57.35	
UDF	Jean-Pierre Pont	16,930	42.65	
Turnout		42,706	70.24	
DVG gain from UDF				

== Sources ==
- Official results of French elections from 1998: "Résultats électoraux officiels en France" (in French).
