= 2024 French legislative election in Charente =

Following the first round of the 2024 French legislative election on 30 June 2024, runoff elections in each constituency where no candidate received a vote share greater than 50 percent were scheduled for 7 July. Candidates permitted to stand in the runoff elections needed to either come in first or second place in the first round or achieve more than 12.5 percent of the votes of the entire electorate (as opposed to 12.5 percent of the vote share due to low turnout).

== Charente ==
=== 1st constituency ===
| Candidate | Party or alliance | | First round | | Second round | |
| Candidate | Party or alliance | | Votes | % | Votes | % |
|---|---|---|---|---|---|---|
| René Pilato | New Popular Front | La France Insoumise | 18,166 | 32.80 | 20,288 | 35.75 |
| Thomas Mesnier | Ensemble | Horizons | 16,784 | 30.30 | 18,406 | 32.43 |
| Marion Latus | National Rally | | 16,761 | 30.26 | 18,061 | 31.82 |
| Alain Boivin | The Republicans | | 2,226 | 4.02 | | |
| Olivier Nicolas | Far-left | Lutte Ouvrière | 818 | 1.48 | | |
| Doraline Bernard | Reconquête | | 633 | 1.14 | | |
| Total | | | 55,388 | 100.00 | 56,755 | 100.00 |
| Valid votes | | | 55,388 | 97.21 | 56,755 | 97.40 |
| Invalid votes | | | 510 | 0.90 | 439 | 0.75 |
| Blank votes | | | 1,079 | 1.89 | 1,074 | 1.84 |
| Total votes | | | 56,977 | 100.00 | 58,268 | 100.00 |
| Registered voters/turnout | | | 84,158 | 67.70 | 84,238 | 69.17 |

=== 2nd constituency ===
| Candidate | Party or alliance | | First round | | Second round | |
| Candidate | Party or alliance | | Votes | % | Votes | % |
|---|---|---|---|---|---|---|
| Barthélémy Martin | Union of the far right | The Republicans | 21,440 | 38.91 | 25,653 | 47.50 |
| Sandra Marsaud | Ensemble | Renaissance | 15,091 | 27.39 | 28,350 | 52.50 |
| Carole Ballu | New Popular Front | La France Insoumise | 11,208 | 20.34 | | |
| Didier Jobit | The Republicans | | 4,829 | 8.76 | | |
| Françoise Bessas | Far-left | Lutte Ouvrière | 832 | 1.51 | | |
| Alain Gérard Janot | Reconquête | | 737 | 1.34 | | |
| Aurore de Clisson | Far-right | Independent | 509 | 0.92 | | |
| Corentin Vinsonneau | Volt | | 457 | 0.83 | | |
| Total | | | 55,103 | 100.00 | 54,003 | 100.00 |
| Valid votes | | | 55,103 | 96.34 | 54,003 | 94.12 |
| Invalid votes | | | 790 | 1.38 | 1,020 | 1.78 |
| Blank votes | | | 1,304 | 2.28 | 2,353 | 4.10 |
| Total votes | | | 57,197 | 100.00 | 57,376 | 100.00 |
| Registered voters/turnout | | | 83,360 | 68.61 | 83,330 | 68.85 |

=== 3rd constituency ===
| Candidate | Party or alliance | | First round | | Second round | |
| Candidate | Party or alliance | | Votes | % | Votes | % |
|---|---|---|---|---|---|---|
| Caroline Colombier | National Rally | | 25,976 | 42.95 | 30,110 | 52.22 |
| Virginie Lebraud | New Popular Front | Socialist Party | 15,653 | 25.88 | 27,548 | 47.78 |
| Gwenhaël François | Ensemble | Renaissance | 14,829 | 24.52 | | |
| Dominique Souchaud | Ecology | Union of Democrats and Independents (Note: Dissident who ran without the backing of Ensemble) | 2,293 | 3.79 | | |
| Adrien Touzé | Reconquête | | 889 | 1.47 | | |
| Patrick Curgali | Far-left | Lutte Ouvrière | 844 | 1.40 | | |
| Total | | | 60,484 | 100.00 | 57,658 | 100.00 |
| Valid votes | | | 60,484 | 95.92 | 57,658 | 90.81 |
| Invalid votes | | | 1,109 | 1.76 | 1,883 | 2.97 |
| Blank votes | | | 1,465 | 2.32 | 3,951 | 6.22 |
| Total votes | | | 63,058 | 100.00 | 63,492 | 100.00 |
| Registered voters/turnout | | | 90,666 | 69.55 | 90,677 | 70.02 |
