= Pas-de-Calais's 8th constituency =

Constituency of the National Assembly of France

8th constituency of the Pas-de-Calais
- inline Constituency of the National Assembly of France

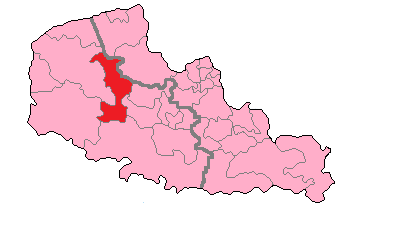
- Pas-de-Calais' 8th constituency shown within Nord-Pas-de-Calais
- Deputy: Auguste Evrard; RN
- Department: Pas-de-Calais
- Cantons: Aire-sur-la-Lys, Arques, Auchel, Norrent-Fontes, Saint-Omer-Nord, Saint-Omer-Sud
- Registered voters: 93,191

The 8th constituency of the Pas-de-Calais is a French legislative constituency in the Pas-de-Calais département.

== Description ==
Pas-de-Calais' 8th constituency is based around the town of Saint-Omer, close to the border with Nord.

Politically the seat bears a close resemblance to others in Pas-de-Calais as it strongly supported the left. This constituency elected Michel Lefait in 1997 after a brief tenure by the conservative Rally for the Republic who captured the seat in the landslide victory at the 1993 elections.

== Historic representation ==
Election	Member	Party
1986	Proportional representation – no election by constituency	
1988	Roland Huguet	PS
1993	Jean-Jacques Delvaux	RPR
1997	Michel Lefait	PS
2002	Michel Lefait	PS
2007	Michel Lefait	PS
2012	Michel Lefait	PS
2017	Benoît Potterie	LREM
2022	Bertrand Petit	PS
2023	Bertrand Petit	PS
2024	Auguste Evrard	RN

== Election results ==
=== 2024 ===
Candidate	Party	Alliance	First round			Second round		
Candidate	Party	Alliance	Votes	%	+/–	Votes	%	+/–
Auguste Evrard	RN		27,164	46.45	+18.99	29,775	52.27	+8.09
Bertrand Petit	PS		18,697	31.97	+9.43	27,186	47.73	-8.09
Benoît Potterie	HOR	Ensemble	9,824	16.80	-4.56			
Hervé Ruffin	LO		1,199	2.05	+0.78			
Alain Atassi	DIV		984	1.68	new			
Jérémie Weber	REC		617	1.05	-1.30			
Votes			58,485	100.00		56,961	100.00	
Valid votes			58,485	97.40	-0.46	56,961	95.34	+2.23
Blank votes			934	1.56	+0.24	1,772	2.97	-1.43
Null votes			627	1.04	+0.23	1,013	1.70	-0.79
Turnout			60,046	64.99	+16.00	59,746	64.67	+17.09
Abstentions			32,342	35.01	-16.00	32,646	35.33	-17.09
Registered voters			92,388			92,392		
Result			RN GAIN FROM PS					

=== 2023 by-election ===
Bertrand Petit's original election was annulled, but he won the by-election held on 30 January 2023. Unlike in the 2022 election, his candidacy was endorsed by NUPES.

2023 by-election: Pas-de-Calais's 8th constituency
Party	Candidate	Votes	%	±%
PS (NUPÉS)	Bertrand Petit	12,295	46.14	+7.85
RN	Auguste Evrard	6,388	23.97	−3.49
HOR (Ensemble)	Benoît Potterie	5,642	21.17	−0.19
LO	Étienne Zannis	1,062	3.99	+2.72
REC	Aude Mayaud	646	2.42	+0.07
LR (UDC)	Lucas Roseuw	615	2.31	−2.75
Turnout		27,401	29.62	−19.37
2nd round result
PS (NUPÉS)	Bertrand Petit	16,190	66.49	+10.67
RN	Auguste Evrard	8,158	33.51	−10.67
Turnout		25,838	27.93	−19.65
PS hold				

=== 2022 ===
Legislative Election 2022: Pas-de-Calais's 8th constituency
Party	Candidate	Votes	%	±%
RN	Auguste Evrard	12,140	27.46	+5.92
PS	Bertrand Petit*	9,961	22.54	N/A
HOR (Ensemble)	Benoît Potterie	9,440	21.36	−5.62
LFI (NUPÉS)	Simon Roussel	6,961	15.75	−22.28
UDI (UDC)	Philippe Caron	2,235	5.06	−2.77
REC	Aude Mayaud	1,037	2.35	N/A
Others	N/A	2,428		
Turnout		44,202	48.99	−2.60
2nd round result
PS	Bertrand Petit*	22,801	55.82	N/A
RN	Auguste Evrard	18,048	44.18	+0.96
Turnout		40,849	47.58	+2.37
PS gain from LREM				

* PS dissident

=== 2017 ===
Candidate	Label	First round		Second round	
Candidate	Label	Votes	%	Votes	%
Benoît Potterie	REM	12,594	26.98	21,431	56.78
Karine Haverlant	FN	10,055	21.54	16,310	43.22
Bertrand Petit	PS	10,022	21.47		
Casimir Letellier	FI	5,334	11.43		
Muriel Volle	UDI	3,657	7.83		
René Hocq	PCF	2,393	5.13		
Florian Quèze	ECO	856	1.83		
Jason Lamiaux	DVD	586	1.26		
Laure Bourel	EXG	498	1.07		
Philippe Rigaud	ECO	405	0.87		
Marie Van Lierde	DIV	277	0.59		
Votes		46,677	100.00	37,741	100.00
Valid votes		46,677	97.28	37,741	89.75
Blank votes		806	1.68	2,645	6.29
Null votes		500	1.04	1,665	3.96
Turnout		47,983	51.59	42,051	45.21
Abstentions		45,033	48.41	50,963	54.79
Registered voters		93,016		93,014	
Source: Ministry of the Interior

=== 2012 ===
Legislative Election 2012: Pas-de-Calais's 8th constituency
Party	Candidate	Votes	%	±%
PS	Michel Lefait	26,144	48.55	−3.42
NM	François Decoster	11,857	22.02	N/A
FN	Evelyne Geronnez	8,461	15.71	+11.14
FG	René Hocq	4,596	8.53	+7.50
Others	N/A	2,792		
Turnout		53,850	57.78	−7.84
2nd round result
PS	Michel Lefait	32,414	65.64	N/A
NM	François Decoster	16,964	34.36	N/A
Turnout		49,378	52.99	N/A
PS hold				

=== 2007 ===
Legislative Election 2007: Pas-de-Calais 8th
Party	Candidate	Votes	%	±%
PS	Michel Lefait	22,994	51.97	
UMP	Marie Pascale Bataille	14,935	33.75	
FN	Marie Duriez	2,023	4.57	
CPNT	Sabine Leurs	1,310	2.96	
LV	Brigitte Persson	898	2.03	
LCR	Habiba Lahbairi	645	1.46	
LO	Flore Lataste	623	1.41	
PCF	René Vandenkoornhuyse	455	1.03	
MNR	Brigitte Lagrange	364	0.83	
Turnout		45,352	65.62	
PS hold		Swing		

=== 2002 ===
Legislative Election 2002: Pas-de-Calais's 8th constituency
Party	Candidate	Votes	%	±%
PS	Michel Lefait	19,402	44.13	
UMP	Marie Pascale Bataille	12,797	29.11	
FN	Severine Leturque	4,515	10.27	
CPNT	Bruno Cottrez	1,872	4.26	
LO	Laurent Clouet	982	2.23	
RPF	Francois Dubout	887	2.02	
Others	N/A	3,513		
Turnout		45,374	67.46	
2nd round result
PS	Michel Lefait	24,634	58.26	
UMP	Marie Pascale Bataille	17,651	41.74	
Turnout		44,077	65.54	
PS hold				

=== 1997 ===
Legislative Election 1997: Pas-de-Calais's 8th constituency
Party	Candidate	Votes	%	±%
PS	Michel Lefait	18,691	39.85	
RPR	Jean-Jacques Delvaux	15,311	32.64	
FN	Frédéric Lorthiois	5,052	10.77	
LV	Jacques Cailliau	2,201	4.69	
MRC	André Bonnier	2,115	4.51	
LO	Christophe Charlon	1,881	4.01	
DVD	Christine Dhorne	1,653	3.52	
Turnout		50,860	79.36	
2nd round result
PS	Michel Lefait	27,777	57.69	
RPR	Jean-Jacques Delvaux	20,368	42.31	
Turnout		50,860	79.36	
PS gain from RPR				

== Sources ==
- Official results of French elections from 1998: "Résultats électoraux officiels en France" (in French).
