= Viollet =

Viollet is a surname. Notable people with the surname include:

- Dennis Viollet (1933–1999), English footballer and manager
- Jean-Claude Viollet (born 1951), French politician
- Paul Viollet (1840–1914), French historian
- Rachel Viollet (born 1972), British tennis player and film producer
