= Charente's 4th constituency =

French legislative constituency, 1988–2010

The 4th constituency of Charente was one of four French legislative constituencies in the Charente département between 1988 and 2010. Following constituency reviews, the constituency was abolished prior to the 2012 legislative election, leaving three constituencies in Charente.

== Description ==
The constituency was defined in the Pasqua re-distribution of 1986. It covered the following (pre-2015) cantons;

- Angoulême-Nord
- Gond-Pontouvre
- Montembœuf
- La Rochefoucauld
- Ruelle-sur-Touvre
- Soyaux

== Deputies ==
Election	Member	Party
1988	Jean-Michel Boucheron	PS
1993	Jean-Claude Beauchaud	PS
1997	Jean-Claude Beauchaud	PS
2002	Jean-Claude Beauchaud	PS
2007	Martine Pinville	DVG (PS dissident)

From 2012 to 2017, Martine Pinville represented Charente's 1st constituency.
