= Martine Froger =

French politician (born 1961)

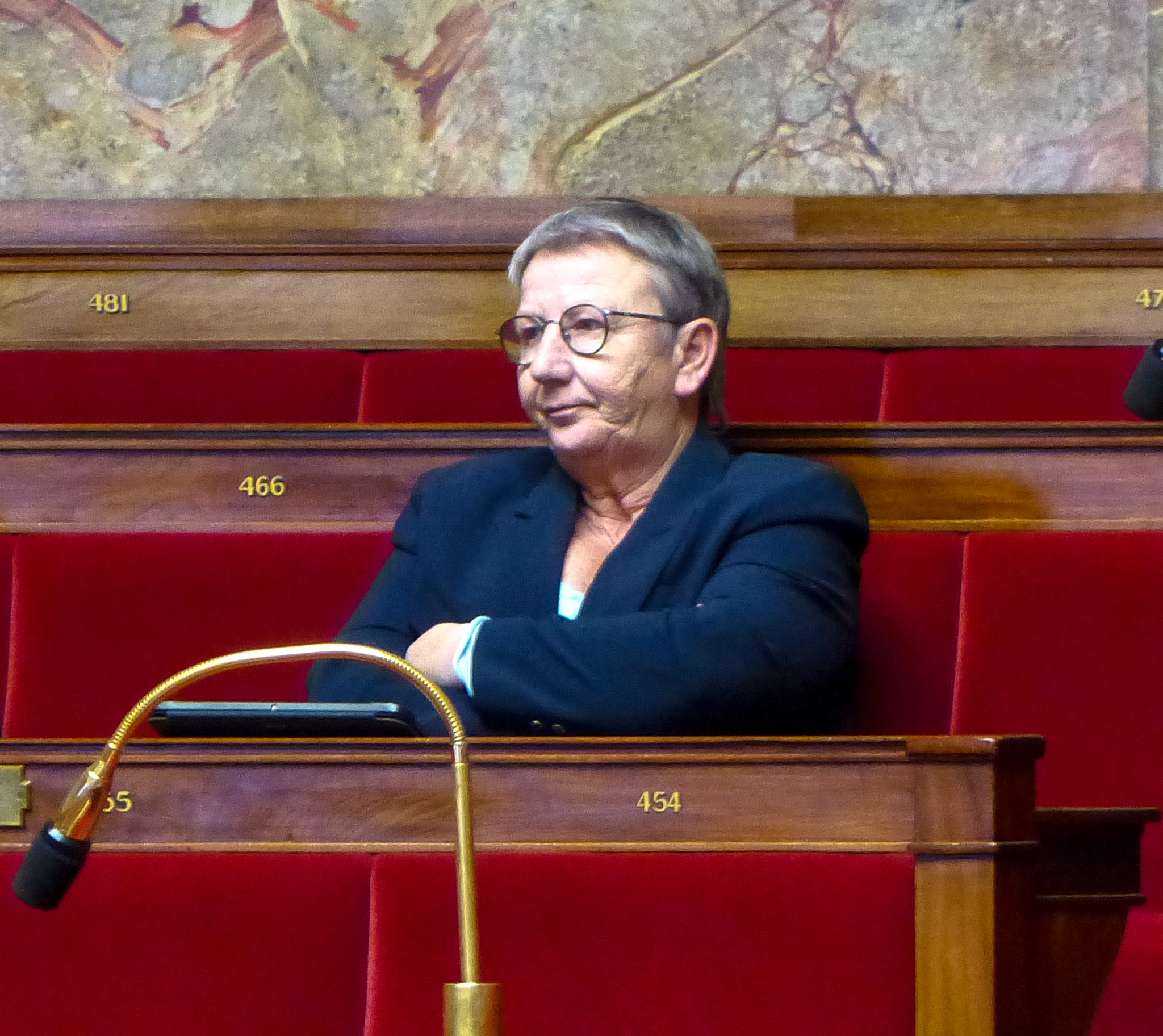
- Martine Froger in January 2025

Member of the National Assembly for Ariège's 1st constituency
- Incumbent
- Assumed office 2 April 2023
- Preceded by: Bénédicte Taurine

Personal details
- Born: 11 June 1961 (age 64) Blois, France
- Party: Socialist

Martine Froger (French pronunciation: [maʁtin fʁɔʒe]; born 11 June 1961) is a French politician from the Socialist Party. In the 2023 by-election she was elected Member of Parliament for Ariège's 1st constituency with support of the federation of the Socialist Party of Ariège but without the nomination of the national leadership of her party which, supported outgoing La France Insoumise MP and candidate of the NUPES coalition Bénédicte Taurine.

== Early life ==
Froger was born in Blois in Loir-et-Cher.

== Professional career ==
Martine Froger is the director of an integration association, the Social Support Center for Agropastoral Techniques (CASTA).

== Political career ==
A member of the Socialist Party, she was deputy mayor of Alzen and substitute for Ariège senator Jean-Jacques Michau. She was also member Couserans-Pyrénées community of municipalities, where she was responsible for education and youth sector. During the Socialist Party congress in Marseille in January 2023, she signed the Refondations motion led by Nicolas Mayer-Rossignol.

=== 2022 elections ===
During the 2022 French legislative election in Ariège's 1st constituency, the federation of the Socialist Party of Ariège nominated her as the party's candidate. However, the national leadership of the Socialist Party supported the outgoing La France Insoumise MP Bénédicte Taurine, as part of the left-wing coalition NUPES. Froger was eliminated in the first round arriving in fourth position, but the election was later annulled by the Constitutional Council.

=== 2023 by-election ===
In the 2023 by-election, the national leadership of the Socialist Party once again supported Bénédicte Taurine as part of NUPES, but the federation of the Socialist Party and the Radical Left Party of Ariège department supported Martine Froger as candidate.

During the first round, Martine Froger came in second with 26.4%, behind Bénédicte Taurine with 31.2%. For the second round, she had the support of the Renaissance candidate Anne-Sophie Tribout who was eliminated in the first round, as well as several socialist figures, such as Nicolas Mayer-Rossignol, Carole Delga, Hélène Geoffroy, Lamia El Aaraje and Michaël Delafosse. Outside the Socialist Party, Guillaume Lacroix, president of the Radical Left Party (PRG), gave her his support; the former Socialist Prime Minister Bernard Cazeneuve travelled to the constituency to support her. With the carryover of votes from Renaissance voters, she won the second round on 2 April 2023 with 60.2% of the votes on a voter turnout of 37.9%. Martine Froger asked the leadership of the Socialist Party to ask to sit in the National Assembly within the socialist group in the National Assembly.

=== 2024 elections ===
In the 2024 French legislative election, she ran as part of the New Popular Front. She was re-elected in the first round with over 50% of the vote.
