= Martine Pinville =

French politician

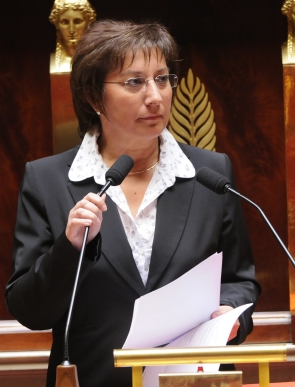
- Martine Pinville in 2011

Member of the Regional Council of Nouvelle-Aquitaine
- Incumbent
- Assumed office 4 January 2016
- President: Alain Rousset

Secretary of State for Commerce, Craft and Social economy
- In office 17 June 2015 – 10 May 2017
- President: François Hollande
- Prime Minister: Manuel Valls; Bernard Cazeneuve
- Preceded by: Carole Delga
- Succeeded by: Olivia Grégoire

Member of the National Assembly for Charente's 1st constituency
- In office 20 June 2012 – 20 June 2017
- Preceded by: David Comet
- Succeeded by: Thomas Mesnier

Member of the National Assembly for Charente's 4th constituency
- In office 20 June 2007 – 20 June 2012
- Preceded by: Jean-Claude Beauchaud
- Succeeded by: constituency abolished

Personal details
- Born: 23 October 1958 (age 67) Angoulême, France
- Party: Socialist Party

Martine Pinville (French pronunciation: [maʁtin pɛ̃vil]; born 23 October 1958 in Angoulême, Charente) was a member of the National Assembly of France until 2017. She represented the Charente department (the 4th then the 1st constituencies), and was a member of the socialist group.

Ahead of the Socialist Party's 2018 convention in Aubervilliers, Pinville publicly endorsed Stéphane Le Foll as candidate for the party's leadership.
