= Ariège's 1st constituency =

Constituency of the National Assembly of France

1st constituency of Ariège
- inline Constituency of the National Assembly of France

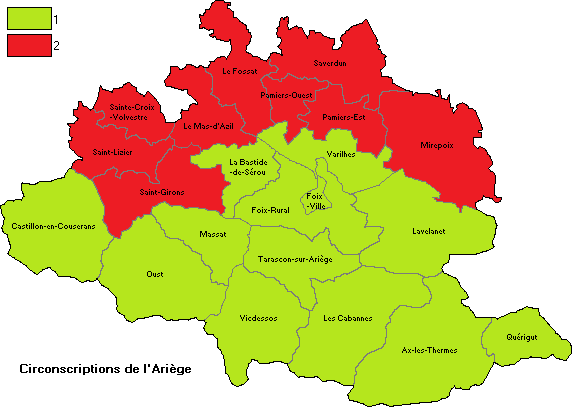
- The two constituencies of Ariège

- Ariège in France
- Deputy: Martine Froger; PS
- Department: Ariège
- Cantons: Ax-les-Thermes, La Bastide-de-Sérou, Les Cabannes, Castillon-en-Couserans, Foix-Rural, Foix-Ville, Lavelanet, Massat, Oust, Quérigut, Tarascon-sur-Ariège, Varilhes, Vicdessos
- Registered voters: 70,373

The 1st constituency of Ariège is a French legislative constituency, covering the south of the Ariège département.

== Deputies ==
Election	Member	Party
1958	Jean Durroux	SFIO
1962	Gilbert Faure	SFIO
1967	Gilbert Faure	FGDS
1968	Gilbert Faure	FGDS
1973	Gilbert Faure	PS
1978	Gilbert Faure	PS
1981	Augustin Bonrepaux	PS
1986	Proportional representation - no election by constituency	
1988	Augustin Bonrepaux	PS
1993	Augustin Bonrepaux	PS
1997	Augustin Bonrepaux	PS
2002	Augustin Bonrepaux	PS
2007	Frédérique Massat	PS
2012	Frédérique Massat	PS
2017	Bénédicte Taurine	LFI
2022	Bénédicte Taurine	LFI
2023	Martine Froger	PS
2024	Martine Froger	PS

== Elections ==
=== 2024 ===
Legislative Election 2024: Ariège's 1st constituency
Party	Candidate	Votes	%	±%
PS	Martine Froger*	19,245	50.74	+19.56
RN	Jean-Marc Garnier	15,049	39.67	+14.89
LO	Gisèle Lapeyre	2,756	7.27	+5.31
REC	Pascal Mascetti	881	2.32	−0.45
Others	Blank votes	1,930	4.73	
Others	Invalid votes	969	2.37	
Turnout		40,830	71.11	+31.51
PS hold				

* PS dissident running without the endorsement of the NFP.

=== 2023 by-election ===
The 2022 election was annulled in January, 2023 by the Constitutional Council, due to an error in the count procedures. The by-election takes place on 26 March and (if a second round is required) 2 April 2023.

2023 by-election: Ariège's 1st constituency
Party	Candidate	Votes	%	±%
LFI (NUPÉS)	Bénédicte Taurine	6,778	31.18	-1.94
PS	Martine Froger*	5,742	26.42	+8.35
RN	Jean-Marc Garnier	5,387	24.78	+4.84
RE (Ensemble)	Anne-Sophie Tribout	2,323	10.69	−9.27
REC	François-Xavier Jossinet	602	2.77	−0.86
Independent	Robert Claraco	478	2.20	N/A
LO	Gisèle Lapeyre	425	1.96	+0.62
Turnout		23,647	39.60	−16.82
2nd round result
PS	Martine Froger*	11,758	60.19	N/A
LFI (NUPÉS)	Bénédicte Taurine	7,776	39.81	−15.50
Turnout		21,691	37.87	−15.15
PS gain from LFI				

* PS dissident, not supported by NUPES

=== 2022 ===
Legislative Election 2022: Ariège's 1st constituency
Party	Candidate	Votes	%	±%
LFI (NUPÉS)	Bénédicte Taurine	10,347	33.12	-7.97
LREM (Ensemble)	Anne-Sophie Tribout	6,237	19.96	-11.39
RN	Jean-Marc Garnier	6,229	19.94	+7.97
DVG	Martine Froger	5,646	18.07	N/A
REC	François-Xavier Jossinet	1,134	3.63	N/A
Others	N/A	1,647		
Turnout		32,424	56.42	+1.31
2nd round result
LFI (NUPÉS)	Bénédicte Taurine	14,746	55.31	+5.03
LREM (Ensemble)	Anne-Sophie Tribout	11,917	44.69	−5.03
Turnout		26,663	53.02	+2.58
LFI hold				

=== 2017 ===
Candidate	Label	First round		Second round	
Candidate	Label	Votes	%	Votes	%
Jérôme Azema	REM	9,478	31.35	12,633	49.72
Bénédicte Taurine	FI	6,125	20.26	12,776	50.28
Martine Esteban	PS	4,093	13.54		
Laurence Lefort	FN	3,618	11.97		
Éric Donzé	DIV	2,197	7.27		
Marie-Noëlle Samarcq	LR	1,616	5.34		
Florence Cortès	ECO	1,275	4.22		
José Navarro	PCF	929	3.07		
Jean-François Astier	ECO	416	1.38		
Robin Cassan	DIV	258	0.85		
Gisèle Lapeyre	EXG	231	0.76		
Votes		30,236	100.00	25,409	100.00
Valid votes		30,236	96.71	25,409	88.80
Blank votes		699	2.24	2,041	7.13
Null votes		329	1.05	1,163	4.06
Turnout		31,264	55.11	28,613	50.44
Abstentions		25,471	44.89	28,118	49.56
Registered voters		56,735		56,731	
Source: Ministry of the Interior

=== 2012 ===
Won in the first round.

Legislative Election 2012: Ariège's 1st
Party	Candidate	Votes	%	±%
PS	Frédérique Massat	17,791	51.69	
UMP	Nicole Gerona	5,449	15.83	
FN	Jacques Warnke	3,765	10.94	
FG	Michel Larive	3,744	10.88	
LV	Pascale Aoura	1,907	5.54	
Center	Joël Rausa	622	1.81	
Far left	Céline Bara	544	1.58	
DVE	Solange Fontaneau	211	0.61	
Far left	Janine Lasserre	205	0.60	
Far left	Gisèle Lapeyre	182	0.53	
Turnout		35,176	62.08	
PS hold		Swing		

=== 2007 ===
Summary of the 10 June and 17 June 2007 French legislative in Ariège’s 1st Constituency election results
Candidate	Party		1st round		2nd round	
Candidate	Party		Votes	%	Votes	%
Frédérique Massat	Socialist Party	PS	15,823	44.66%	22,236	65.91%
Jacqueline Rouge	Union for a Popular Movement	UMP	8,614	24.31%	11,500	34.09%
Lyliane Cassan	Communist	COM	2,419	6.83%		
Patrick Pont	Democratic Movement	MoDem	2,311	6.52%		
Denis Seel	Far Left	EXG	1,274	3.60%		
Marc Saracino	The Greens	VEC	1,174	3.31%		
Jean-Luc Fernandez	Hunting, Fishing, Nature, Traditions	CPNT	1,098	3.10%		
Josette Zammit	National Front	FN	948	2.68%		
José Serrano	Movement for France	MPF	752	2.12%		
Sylvie Grizon	Divers	DIV	446	1.26%		
Didier Soulet	Far Left	EXG	243	0.69%		
Thierry Cuviller	Far Right	EXD	168	0.47%		
Véronique Bucaille	Majorité Présidentielle		163	0.46%		
Total			35,433	100%	33,736	100%
Registered voters			56,045		56,037	
Blank/Void ballots			1,061	2.91%	1,797	5.06%
Turnout			36,494	65.12%	35,533	63.41%
Abstentions			19,551	34.88%	20,504	36.59%
Result					PS HOLD	

=== 2002 ===
Legislative Election 2002: Ariège's 1st constituency
Party	Candidate	Votes	%	±%
PS	Augustin Bonrepaux	15,373	43.27	
UMP	Yves Maris	5,502	15.49	
FN	Georges Mesplié	3,085	8.68	
CPNT	Andre Metge	2,548	7.17	
PCF	Lyliane Cassan	2,269	6.39	
LV	Bernard Voegeli	1,458	4.10	
DVG	Jacques Carol	1,431	4.03	
LCR	Michele Cassan	1,018	2.87	
MPF	Jean Darnaud	987	2.78	
Others	N/A	1,856		
Turnout		36,794	68.05	
2nd round result
PS	Augustin Bonrepaux	20,496	66.57	
UMP	Yves Maris	10,294	33.43	
Turnout		33,598	62.14	
PS hold				

=== 1997 ===
Legislative Election 1997: Ariège's 1st constituency
Party	Candidate	Votes	%	±%
PS	Augustin Bonrepaux	15,729	44.48	
RPR	Henri de Tappie	6,621	18.72	
PCF	Lyliane Cassan	4,323	12.22	
FN	Georges Mesplié	3,523	9.96	
LV	Françoise Matricon	1,710	4.84	
LO	Didier Soulet	928	2.62	
MPF	Jean Darnaud	806	2.28	
Others	N/A	1,725		
Turnout		37,405	71.38	
2nd round result
PS	Augustin Bonrepaux	24,185	69.90	
RPR	Henri de Tappie	10,412	30.10	
Turnout		37,415	71.42	
PS hold				
