= Charente's 1st constituency =

Constituency of the National Assembly of France

1st constituency of Charente
- inline Constituency of the National Assembly of France

- The three constituencies of Charente

- Charente in France
- Deputy: René Pilato; LFI
- Department: Charente
- Cantons: Angoulême-Est, Angoulême-Nord, Angoulême-Ouest, Le Gond-Pontouvre, La Couronne, Ruelle-sur-Touvre, Soyaux
- Registered voters: 126,397

The 1st constituency of Charente is a French legislative constituency in the Charente département.

== Deputies ==
Election	Member	Party
1958	Raymond Réthoré	UNR
1962	Raymond Réthoré	UNR
1967	Raymond Réthoré	UDR
1968	Raymond Réthoré	UDR
1973	Raymond Réthoré	UDR
1978	Jean-Michel Boucheron	PS
1981	Jean-Michel Boucheron	PS
1986	Proportional representation - no election by constituency	
1988	Georges Chavanes	UDF
1993	Georges Chavanes	UDF
1997	Jean-Claude Viollet	PS
2002	Jean-Claude Viollet	PS
2007	Jean-Claude Viollet	PS
2012	Martine Pinville	PS
2017	Thomas Mesnier	LREM
2021	Thomas Mesnier	H
2022	Thomas Mesnier	H
2023	René Pilato	LFI
2024	René Pilato	LFI

== Election results ==
=== 2024 ===
Candidate	Party	Alliance	First round			Second round		
Candidate	Party	Alliance	Votes	%	+/–	Votes	%	+/–
René Pilato	LFI	NFP	18,166	32.80	-5.27	20,288	35.75	-14.22
Thomas Mesnier	HOR	ENS	16,784	30.30	-0.15	18,406	32.43	-17.60
Marion Latus	RN		16,761	30.26	+14.21	18,061	31.82	new
Alain Boivin	LR	UDC	2,226	4.02	-1.22			
Olivier Nicolas	LO		818	1.48	+0.58			
Doraline Bernard	REC		633	1.14	-3.13			
Votes			55,388	100.00		56,755	100.00	
Valid votes			55,388	97.21	-0.85	56,755	97.40	+5.00
Blank votes			1,079	1.89	+0.63	1,074	1.84	-3.09
Null votes			510	0.90	+0.22	439	0.75	-1.91
Turnout			56,977	67.70	+18.39	58,268	69.17	+20.48
Abstentions			27,181	32.30	-18.39	25,970	30.83	-20.48
Registered voters			84,158			84,238		
Result			LFI WIN FROM HOR					

As LFI won the 2023 by-election, which was a gain from HOR, this result is stylised as a 'win' as opposed to a 'gain'.

=== 2023 by-election ===
2023 by-election: Charente's 1st constituency
Party	Candidate	Votes	%	±%
HOR (Ensemble)	Thomas Mesnier	8,353	35.54	+5.09
LFI (NUPÉS)	René Pilato	8,311	35.36	+7.83
RN	Florent Benetreau	3,485	14.83	−1.22
LR (UDC)	Alice Clergeau	1,107	4.71	−0.53
Independent	Samuel Cazenave	843	3.59	N/A
REC	Serge Bondon	500	2.13	−2.14
DVE	Dominique Souchaud	480	2.04	−1.01
LO	Olivier Nicolas	425	1.81	+0.91
Turnout		24,146	28.76	−20.55
2nd round result
LFI (NUPÉS)	René Pilato	12,200	50.99	+1.02
HOR (Ensemble)	Thomas Mesnier	11,726	49.01	−1.02
Turnout		25,362	30.21	−18.48
LFI gain from HOR				

=== 2022 ===
Legislative Election 2022: Charente's 1st constituency
Party	Candidate	Votes	%	±%
HOR (Ensemble)	Thomas Mesnier	12,336	30.45	-7.55
LFI (NUPÉS)	René Pilato	11,152	27.53	-5.90
RN	Anna Martinese	6,503	16.05	+6.68
PS	Jean-François Dauré	5,065	12.50	N/A
LR (UDC)	Alice Clergeau	2,122	5.24	−6.20
REC	Dominique De Lorgeril	1,731	4.27	N/A
DVE	Corinne Berthelot	1,237	3.05	N/A
LO	Olivier Nicolas	363	0.90	N/A
Turnout		40,509	49.31	+1.15
2nd round result
HOR (Ensemble)	Thomas Mesnier	18,854	50.03	-9.92
LFI (NUPÉS)	René Pilato	18,830	49.97	+9.92
Turnout		37,684	48.69	+7.06
HOR gain from LREM				

=== 2017 ===
Candidate	Label	First round		Second round	
Candidate	Label	Votes	%	Votes	%
Thomas Mesnier	REM	15,228	38.00	19,360	59.95
Martine Boutin	FI	5,331	13.30	12,935	40.05
Martine Pinville	PS	4,642	11.58		
Élise Vouvet	LR	4,586	11.44		
Geoffray Gourré	FN	3,756	9.37		
Djillali Merioua	PCF	1,822	4.55		
Odile Achard	ECO	1,605	4.00		
Vincent You	DVD	1,595	3.98		
Olivier Gallet	EXD	396	0.99		
Olivier Nicolas	EXG	347	0.87		
Guillaume Serrano	DIV	258	0.64		
Aline Blancher Mouquet	DVG	229	0.57		
Dominique de Lorgeril	DIV	206	0.51		
Clément Séjourné	DVG	71	0.18		
Rodolphe Petit-Galland	DVD	3	0.01		
Votes		40,075	100.00	32,295	100.00
Valid votes		40,075	97.91	32,295	91.33
Blank votes		575	1.40	1,902	5.38
Null votes		281	0.69	1,165	3.29
Turnout		40,931	48.16	35,362	41.63
Abstentions		44,065	51.84	49,573	58.37
Registered voters		84,996		84,935	
Source: Ministry of the Interior

=== 2012 ===
Legislative Election 2012: Charente's 1st constituency
Party	Candidate	Votes	%	±%
PS	Martine Pinville	23,009	50.08	
UMP	Élise Vouvet	9,964	21.69	
FN	Marie-Christine Cardoso	4,757	10.35	
FG	Marie-Hélène Boutet de Monvel	2,673	6.01	
VIA	Vincent You	2,017	4.39	
EELV	Cyril Tardat	1,708	3.72	
Independent	Dominique de Lorgeril	546	1.19	
NPA	Michel Deboeuf	304	0.66	
NM	Catherine Tarrius	257	0.56	
CNIP	Alain Chailloux	254	0.55	
LO	Jean-Pierre Courtois	200	0.44	
AR	Danielle Duclos	96	0.21	
DLF	Jean-Carlo Sitzia-Le Blond	68	0.15	
Turnout		46,619	55.30	
PS hold		Swing		

=== 2007 ===
Summary of the 10 June and 17 June 2007 French legislative election in Charente’s 1st Constituency
Candidate	Party		1st round		2nd round	
Candidate	Party		Votes	%	Votes	%
Jean-Claude Viollet	Socialist Party	PS	15,615	40.93%	22,687	58.74%
Martine Faury	Union for a Popular Movement	UMP	13,309	34.89%	15,935	41.26%
Samuel Cazenave	Democratic Movement	MoDem	3,197	8.38%		
Jean-Yves Le Turdu	The Greens	VEC	1,145	3.00%		
Yseult Goutierre	Front National	FN	1,017	2.67%		
Jean-Pierre Bellefaye	Far Left	EXG	933	2.45%		
Fanny Luteau	Communist	PCF	716	1.88%		
Danièle Duclaud	Movement for France	MPF	588	1.54%		
Yann Andrieux	Hunting, Fishing, Nature, Traditions	CPNT	506	1.33%		
Jean-Pierre Courtois	Far Left	EXG	326	0.85%		
Valérie Paour	Ecologist	ECO	287	0.75%		
Alain Chailloux	Miscellaneous Right	DVD	261	0.68%		
Josette Blanc	Independent	DIV	249	0.65%		
Total			38,149	100%	38,622	100%
Registered voters			63,709		63,710	
Blank/Void ballots			895	2.29%	955	2.41%
Turnout			39,044	61.28%	39,577	62.12%
Abstentions			24,665	38.72%	24,133	37.88%
Result					PS HOLD	

=== 2002 ===
Legislative Election 2002: Charente's 1st constituency
Party	Candidate	Votes	%	±%
PS	Jean-Claude Viollet	14,207	35.92	
UMP	Jean-Michel Bolvin	11,427	28.89	
FN	Alain Leroy	3,635	9.19	
MPF	Jean-Yves de Prat	3,505	8.86	
LV	Jean Revereault	2,019	5.10	
PCF	Maryse Dumeix	1,064	2.69	
CPNT	Michel Bourgogne	1,051	2.66	
Others	N/A	2,645		
Turnout		40,472	64.64	
2nd round result
PS	Jean-Claude Viollet	19,246	51.05	
UMP	Jean-Michel Bolvin	18,454	48.95	
Turnout		39,020	62.32	
PS hold				

=== 1997 ===
Legislative Election 1997: Charente's 1st constituency
Party	Candidate	Votes	%	±%
UDF	Philippe Mottet	13,051	33.98	
PS	Jean-Claude Viollet	11,159	29.05	
FN	Alain Leroy	4,110	10.70	
PCF	Maryse Dumeix	2,877	7.49	
MRC	Bernad Desbordes	1,749	4.55	
LV	Jean Révéreault	1,717	4.47	
LO	Jean-Pierre Courtois	1,046	2.72	
MPF	Joël Bouchaud	981	2.55	
GE	Daniel Grandclément	865	2.25	
Others	N/A	858		
Turnout		40,721	67.04	
2nd round result
PS	Jean-Claude Viollet	22,118	53.23	
UDF	Philippe Mottet	19,433	46.77	
Turnout		43,815	72.12	
PS gain from UDF				

== Sources ==
- French Interior Ministry results website: "Résultats électoraux officiels en France" (in French).
