= Bénédicte Taurine =

French politician

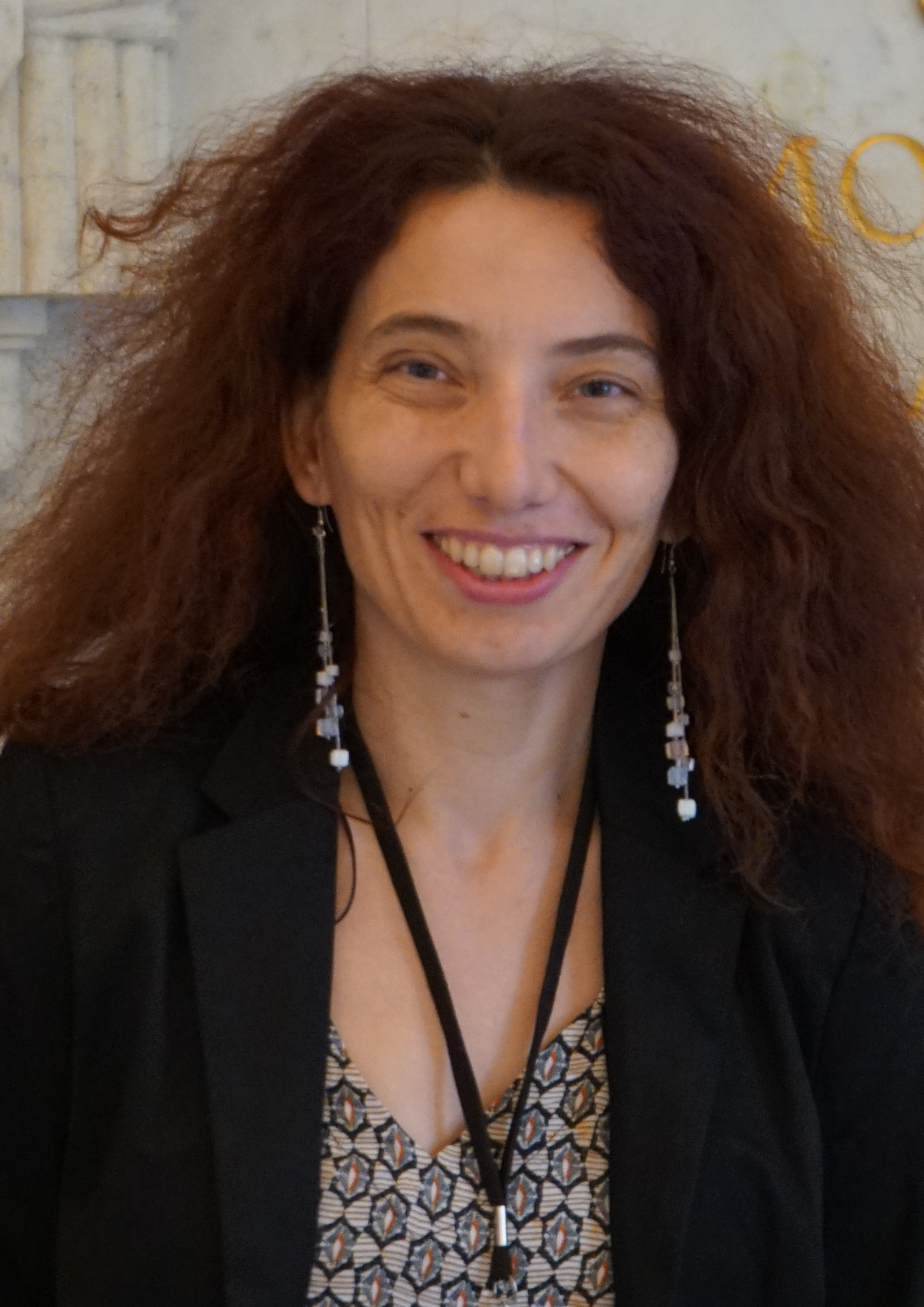

Member of the French National Assembly for Ariège's 1st constituency
- In office 21 June 2017 – 27 January 2023
- Preceded by: Frédérique Massat
- Succeeded by: Martine Froger

Personal details
- Born: 18 June 1976 (age 49) Lavelanet, France
- Party: PCF; FI
- Education: Paul Sabatier University
- Occupation: Teacher

Bénédicte Taurine (born 18 June 1976) is a French politician. She was a member of the French National Assembly for the department of Ariège from 2017 to 2023, representing La France Insoumise.

== Biography ==
=== Early life ===
Taurine is a teacher in Life and Earth Sciences at a Secondary School, she also carries out union duties at the National Union of Secondary Education.

=== Political career ===
In 2015, she was a candidate for regional elections in Occitanie on the list "New world in common", grouping several parties of radical left, but was not elected.

=== Member of the National Assembly ===
She was elected member of the first constituency of Ariège on 18 June 2017 with 50.28% of the votes in the second round under the political banner of La France Insoumise.

In the National Assembly, she sat on the Economic Affairs Committee, and she was a member of Delegation for Women's Rights and Equal Opportunities for Men and Women. She was president of the France-Andorra Friendship Group.

She was re-elected in the 2022 French legislative election. Her election was annulled by the Constitutional Council in January 2023. She lost the seat in the second round of the by-election on 2 April 2023.

== See also ==
- 2017 French legislative election
