= Aina Kuric =

French politician

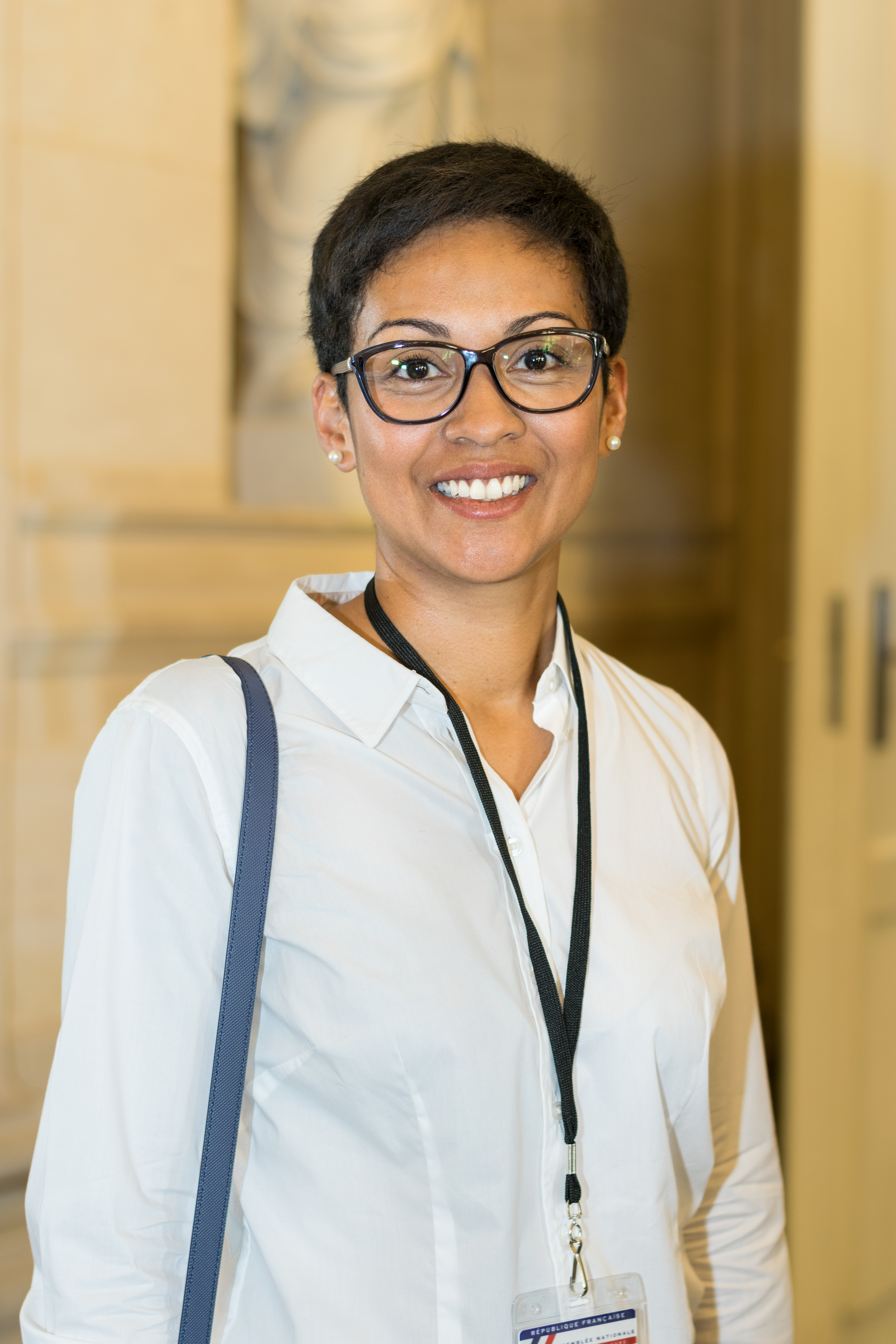

Member of the National Assembly for Marne's 2nd constituency
- In office 21 June 2017 – 21 June 2022
- Preceded by: Catherine Vautrin
- Succeeded by: Anne-Sophie Frigout

Personal details
- Born: 15 May 1987 (age 38) Creil, France
- Party: Agir (2019 to present)
- Other political affiliations: La République En Marche! (2016–2019)
- Occupation: Business leader in oenology

Aina Kuric (born 15 May 1987 in Creil) is a French politician who served as a member of the French National Assembly from 2017 to 2022, representing the department of Marne,

From 2016 until 2017, Kuric was a member of La République En Marche! (LREM). She quit her party on 6 June 2019, having been a prominent critic of the asylum-immigration bill proposed by the government in July 2018. She remained, however, a member of LREM's parliamentary group.

== Early life and career ==
Kuric has family roots in Madagascar. She holds a BTS in hospitality. She is a company manager who organizes guided tours of vineyards.

== Political career ==
Having acted as the departmental organizer and contact person (référente) for the newly established En Marche! party in Marne during the 2017 French presidential election campaign, Kuric was elected to the National Assembly in the legislative elections which followed in June of that year. Standing for En Marche! in the 2nd constituency of Marne, she received 51.21% of the votes cast in the second round, beating the outgoing deputy, The Republicans' Catherine Vautrin.

In the National Assembly, Kuric served on the Finance Committee from 2017 until 2018 before moving to the Committee on Foreign Affairs. In addition to her committee assignments, she was part of the French-Madagascar Parliamentary Friendship Group.

Kuric later joined Agir. She lost her seat in the first round of the 2022 French legislative election.

== Political positions ==
In July 2019, Kuric voted in favor of the French ratification of the European Union’s Comprehensive Economic and Trade Agreement (CETA) with Canada.

== See also ==
- 2017 French legislative election
