= Benoît Potterie =

French politician (born 1967)

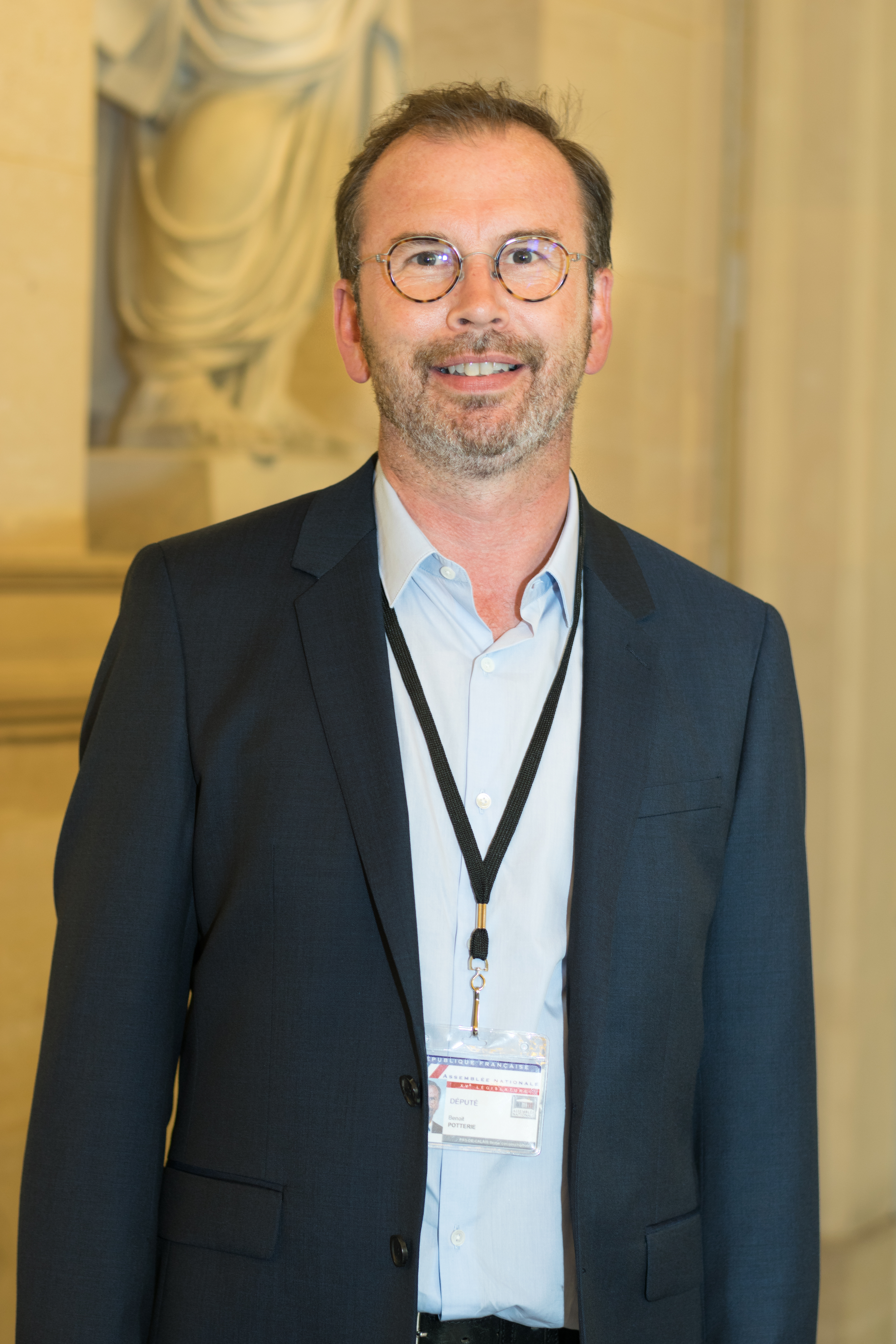

Member of the National Assembly for the Pas-de-Calais's 8th constituency
- In office June 2017 – June 2022
- Preceded by: Michel Lefait
- Succeeded by: Bertrand Petit

Personal details
- Born: 23 July 1967 (age 59) Calais, France
- Party: La République En Marche!
- Education: Henri Poincaré University

Benoît Potterie (French pronunciation: [bənwa pɔtʁi]; born 23 July 1967) is a French optician and politician of La République En Marche! (LREM) who served as a member of the National Assembly of France from 2017 to 2022, representing the department of Pas-de-Calais.

== Political career ==
In parliament, Potterie served as member of the Committee on Economic Affairs (2017-2019) and the Finance Committee (2019-2020) before moving to the Cultural and Education Affairs Committee. In addition to his committee assignments, he was part of the French-Albanian Parliamentary Friendship Group and the French Parliamentary Friendship Group with Bosnia and Herzegovina.

In 2019, Potterie was one of only nine LREM members who voted against his parliamentary group's majority and opposed the French ratification of the European Union’s Comprehensive Economic and Trade Agreement (CETA) with Canada. In 2020, Potterie joined the Agir party's parliamentary group.

In the 2022 French legislative election, he stood as a Horizons (Ensemble) candidate. He lost his seat in the first round.

== See also ==
- 2017 French legislative election
