= Antoine Golliot =

French politician (born 1985)

Member of the French National Assembly for Pas-de-Calais's 5th constituency
- Incumbent
- Assumed office 18 July 2024
- Preceded by: Jean-Pierre Pont

Personal details
- Born: 13 August 1985 (age 40)
- Party: National Rally

Antoine Golliot Van Damme (born 13 August 1985) is a French politician of the National Rally who was elected member of the National Assembly for Pas-de-Calais's 5th constituency in 2024. He also serves as municipal councillor in Boulogne-sur-Mer. He previously contested the constituency in the 2012, 2017 and 2022 elections.
