= Marne's 2nd constituency =

Constituency of the National Assembly of France

2nd constituency of Marne
- inline Constituency of the National Assembly of France

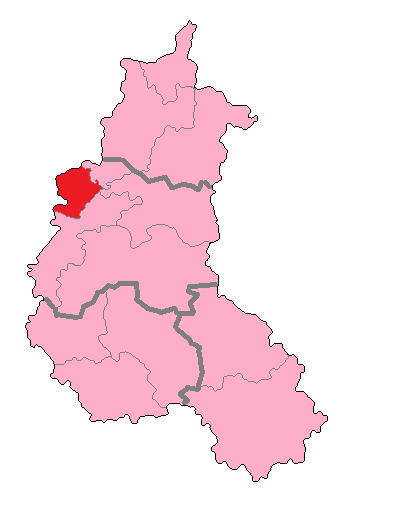
- The constituency shown within Champagne-Ardenne
- Incumbent deputy: Laure Miller; RE
- Department: Marne
- Cantons: Châtillon-sur-Marne (part), Fismes, Reims I, Reims III, Reims V, Reims VIII, Ville-en-Tardenois
- Registered voters: 73,131 (2017)

The 2nd constituency of Marne (French: Deuxième circonscription de la Marne) is one of five electoral districts in the department of the same name, each of which returns one deputy to the French National Assembly in elections using the two-round system, with a run-off if no candidate receives more than 50% of the vote in the first round.

== Description ==
The constituency is made up of six whole former cantons – those of Fismes, Reims I, Reims III, Reims V, Reims VIII, and Ville-en-Tardenois – plus the major part of the former canton of Châtillon-sur-Marne (all communes except those of Courtagnon, Nanteuil-la-Forêt, and Pourcy).

It includes the centre and south of Reims as well as rural areas to the south of the city. The seat as currently delineated is substantially different from that which existed prior to the 2012 election, which contained little of Reims and was far more rural in character.

At the time of the 1999 census (which was the basis for the most recent redrawing of constituency boundaries, carried out in 2010) the 2nd constituency had a total population of 103,767.

For 24 years from 1993 the seat was held by the Gaullist right, from 2002 in the person of Catherine Vautrin who held various posts in the governments of Jean-Pierre Raffarin and Dominique de Villepin. However, in the 2017 election Vautrin lost her seat to Aina Kuric of La République En Marche! (REM). Kuric resigned her membership of LREM on 7 June 2019, joining Agir.

== Historic representation ==
Election	Member	Party
1986	Proportional representation – no election by constituency	
1988	Georges Colin	PS
1993	Jean-Claude Étienne	RPR
1997	Jean-Claude Étienne	RPR
2002	Catherine Vautrin	UMP
2007	Catherine Vautrin	UMP
2012	Catherine Vautrin	UMP
2017	Aina Kuric	LREM
2019	Aina Kuric	Agir
2022	Anne-Sophie Frigout	RN
2023	Laure Miller	RE
2024	Laure Miller	RE

== Election results ==
=== 2024 ===
Candidate	Party	Alliance	First round			Second round		
Candidate	Party	Alliance	Votes	%	+/–	Votes	%	+/–
Anne-Sophie Frigout	RN		17,645	36.34	+14.36	19,859	41.92	-12.89
Laure Miller	RE	Ensemble	14,756	30.39	+9.16	27,511	58.08	new
Stéphane Pirouelle	LFI	NFP	10,560	21.75	-0.71	withdrew		
Stéphane Lang	LR	UDC	3,425	7.05	-3.82			
Ghislain Wysocinski	DIV		1,301	2.68	new			
Marie Pace	REC		446	0.92	-3.97			
Thomas Rose	LO		420	0.87	-0.54			
Votes			48,553	100.00		47,370	100.00	
Valid votes			48,553	98.20	+2.69	47,370	95.67	+13.66
Blank votes			552	1.12	-0.14	1,593	3.22	-11.25
Null votes			338	0.68	-2.55	552	1.11	-2.41
Turnout			49,443	66.25	+20.23	49,515	66.34	+22.69
Abstentions			25,184	33.75	-20.23	25,122	33.66	-22.69
Registered voters			74,627			74,637		
Result			RE WIN					

=== 2023 by-election ===
On 2 December 2022, Anne-Sophie Frigout's election was annulled by the Constitutional Council. She lost the seat in the second round of the by-election on 29 January 2023.

2023 by-election: Marne's 2nd constituency
Party	Candidate	Votes	%	±%
RN	Anne-Sophie Frigout	6,059	34.80	+12.82
RE (Ensemble)	Laure Miller	5,228	30.03	+8.80
LFI (NUPÉS)	Victorien Pâté	2,815	16.17	−6.29
LR (UDC)	Stéphane Lang	1,929	11.08	+0.21
DVE	Nesma Sayoud	521	2.99	−0.48
REC	Marie Pace	436	2.50	−2.39
Others	N/A	424	2.43	−
Turnout		17.411	23.96	−22.06
2nd round result
RE (Ensemble)	Laure Miller	9,047	51.80	N/A
RN	Anne-Sophie Frigout	8,418	48.20	−6.62
Turnout		18,704	25.17	−18.49
RE gain from RN				

=== 2022 ===
Legislative Election 2022: Marne's 2nd constituency
Party	Candidate	Votes	%	±%
LFI (NUPÉS)	Lynda Meguenine	7,369	22.46	+4.36
RN	Anne-Sophie Frigout	7,213	21.98	+5.88
LREM (Ensemble)	Laure Miller	6,964	21.23	−13.11
LREM	Aina Kuric*	4,103	12.51	N/A
LR (UDC)	Stéphane Lang	3,565	10.87	−15.57
REC	Jean-Claude Philipot	1,603	4.89	N/A
DVE	Nesma Sayoud	1,139	3.47	+2.28
Others	N/A	853	-	−
Turnout		32,809	46.02	+1.74
2nd round result
RN	Anne-Sophie Frigout	14,650	54.81	N/A
LFI (NUPÉS)	Lynda Meguenine	12,080	45.19	N/A
Turnout		26,730	43.65	+1.91
RN gain from LREM				

* Kuric stood as a dissident LREM candidate, without the support of the party or the Ensemble Citoyens alliance. Kuric's results in the last election are counted against the official LREM candidate for swing calculations.

=== 2017 ===
Candidate	Label	First round		Second round	
Candidate	Label	Votes	%	Votes	%
Aina Kuric	REM	11,839	34.34	14,176	51.21
Catherine Vautrin	LR	9,115	26.44	13,508	48.79
Cindy Demange	FN	5,552	16.10		
Victorien Pâté	FI	3,459	10.03		
Imane Maniani	PS	1,869	5.42		
Patricia Coradel	ECO	913	2.65		
Daniel Ménard	DLF	654	1.90		
Catherine Huat	ECO	410	1.19		
Thomas Rose	EXG	345	1.00		
Evelyne Fernandez-Toussaint	DIV	187	0.54		
Axel Gaucher	DIV	134	0.39		
Votes		34,477	100.00	27,684	100.00
Valid votes		34,477	98.71	27,684	90.70
Blank votes		296	0.85	2,028	6.64
Null votes		154	0.44	811	2.66
Turnout		34,927	47.76	30,523	41.74
Abstentions		38,206	52.24	42,608	58.26
Registered voters		73,133		73,131	
Source: Ministry of the Interior

=== 2012 ===
Legislative Election 2012: Marne's 2nd constituency
Party	Candidate	Votes	%	±%
UMP	Catherine Vautrin-Pennaforte	16,703	41.81	
PS	Eric Quenard	14,427	36.11	
FN	Pascale Evanno	5,080	12.72	
FG	Francoise Georges	1,454	3.64	
EELV	Nadine Cortial	1,037	2.60	
Others	N/A	1,248		
Turnout		39,949	55.02	
2nd round result
UMP	Catherine Vautrin-Pennaforte	20,640	53.04	
PS	Eric Quenard	18,274	46.96	
Turnout		38,914	53.60	
UMP hold				

== Sources ==
- Official results of French elections from 2002: "Résultats électoraux officiels en France" (in French).
- Official results of the French elections from 2017: "" (in French).
