= Jean-Jacques Delvaux =

French politician

Jean-Jacques Delvaux (French pronunciation: [ʒɑ̃ ʒak dɛlvo]; 10 August 1942, Saint-Omer – 6 June 2017) was a French politician who served in the National Assembly from 1993 to 1997. representing Pas-de-Calais's 8th constituency. He died of cancer at the age of 74 in 2017.
