= Auguste Evrard =

French politician (born 2000)

Member of the French National Assembly for Pas-de-Calais's 8th constituency
- Incumbent
- Assumed office 18 July 2024
- Preceded by: Bertrand Petit

Personal details
- Born: 4 May 2000 (age 26)
- Party: National Rally (since 2019)
- Other political affiliations: La France Insoumise (formerly)

Auguste Evrard (born 4 May 2000) is a French politician of the National Rally who was elected member of the National Assembly for Pas-de-Calais's 8th constituency in 2024.

== Early life and career ==
Evrard was a member of La France Insoumise as a lycée student, and joined the National Rally in 2019. He is a former parliamentary assistant to member of the European Parliament Philippe Olivier, and later worked for mayor of Bruay-la-Buissière Ludovic Pajot. In the 2022 legislative election and the 2023 by-election, he unsuccessfully contested Pas-de-Calais's 8th constituency.
