= Anne-Sophie Frigout =

French educator and politician (born 1991)

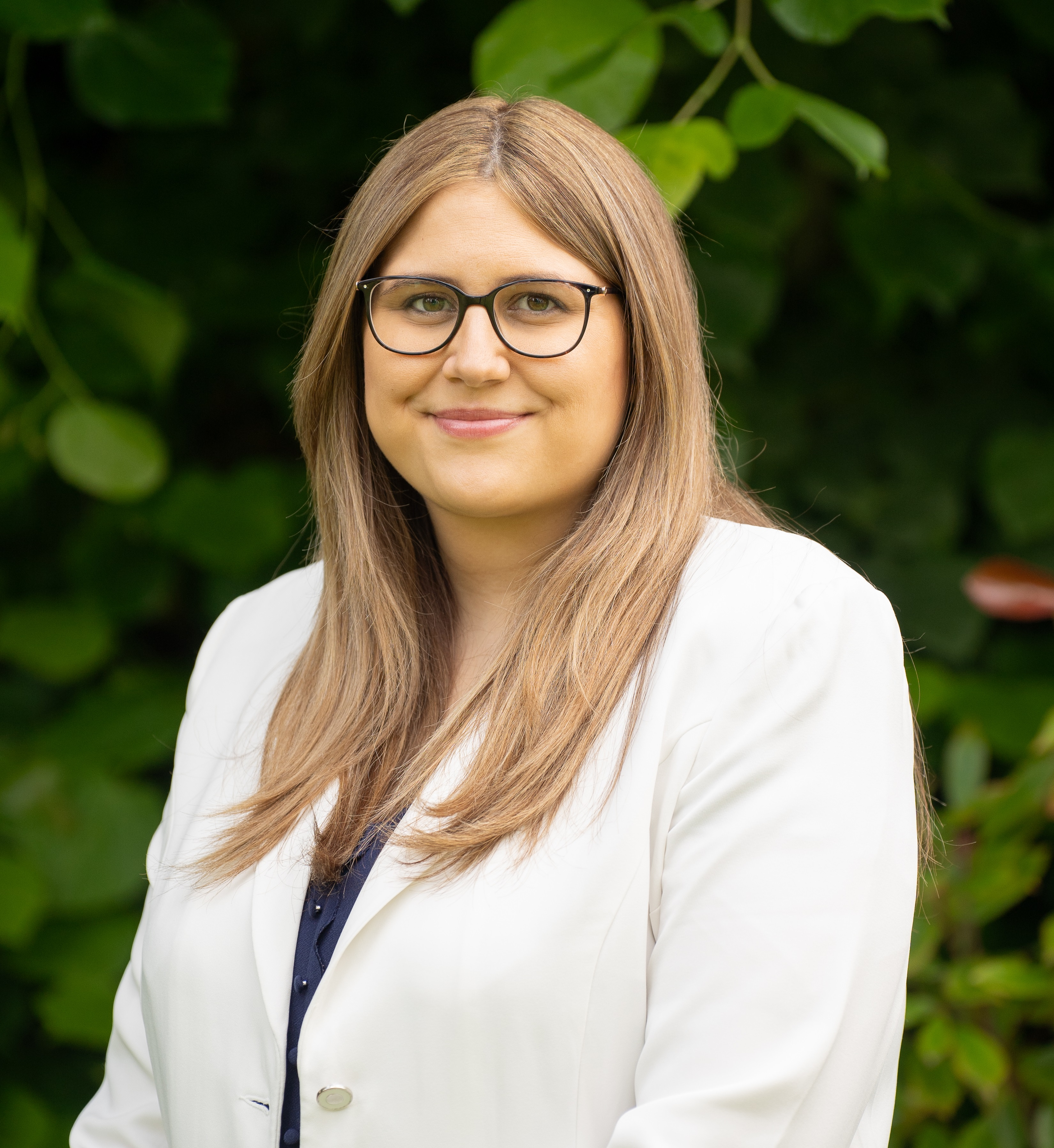

Member of the National Assembly for Marne's 2nd constituency
- In office 22 June 2022 – 2 December 2022
- Preceded by: Aina Kuric
- Succeeded by: Laure Miller

Personal details
- Born: 11 April 1991 (age 34)
- Party: National Rally (2021-present)
- Other political affiliations: Debout la France (2012-2020)
- Occupation: Teacher, professor, politician

Anne-Sophie Frigout (born 11 April 1991) is a French educator and politician affiliated to the National Rally. She was elected as a deputy for Marne's 2nd constituency during the 2022 French legislative election. She was previously vice-president of the Debout la France party.

She was elected Member of the European Parliament (MEP) in the 2024 European Parliament election. She is a candidate in Marne's 2nd constituency in the 2024 French legislative election.

== Biography ==
Frigout trained as a teacher and taught at a secondary school before working as a professor of geography and history at a further education college in Fismes.

Frigout started in politics as a member of Debout la France and served as vice-president of the party. She was head of the list for Marne in the regional elections of 2015, alongside Laurent Jacobelli but was not elected. In 2021, she stood on the same list for the National Rally and was successful.

She stood for DLF in Marne's 1st constituency at the 2017 French legislative election, but was eliminated in the first round, coming in seventh place. At the 2022 elections for the French National Assembly she was selected to stand in Marne's 2nd constituency and was elected to represent the seat.

On 2 December 2022, her election was annulled by the Constitutional Council. She lost the seat in the second round of the by-election on 29 January 2023.
