= Laure Miller =

French politician (born 1983)

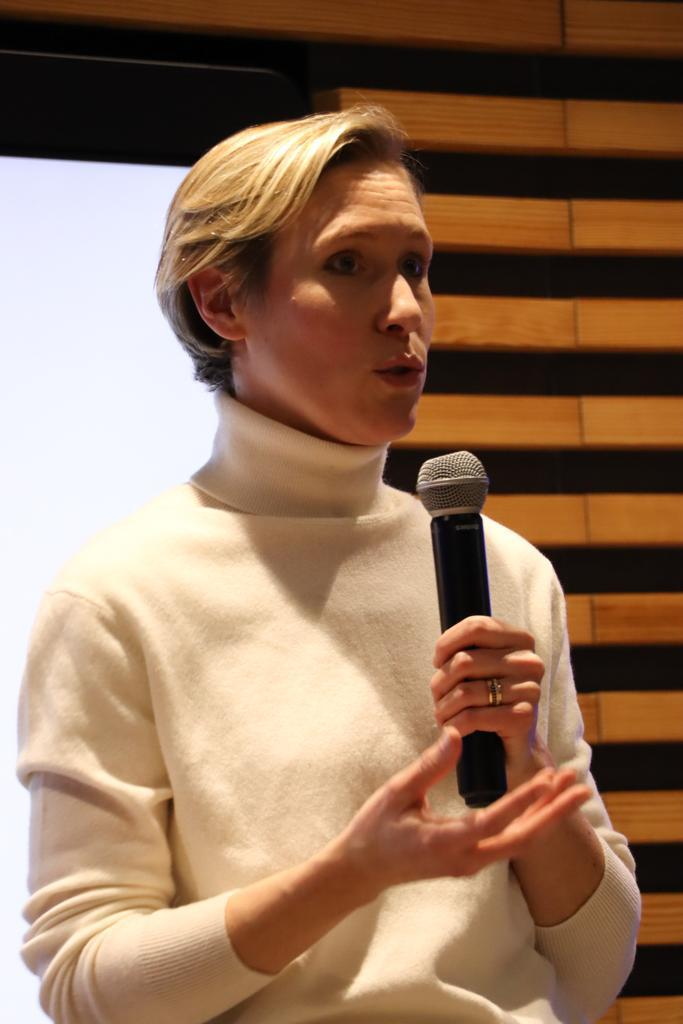

Member of the National Assembly for Marne's 2nd constituency
- Incumbent
- Assumed office 30 January 2023
- Preceded by: Anne-Sophie Frigout

Personal details
- Born: Laure Miller; 25 December 1983 (age 42) Reims, France
- Party: Renaissance (since 2022)
- Other political affiliations: The Republicans (France) (2015–2022); UMP (until 2015)

Laure Miller (born 25 December 1983) is a French politician from Renaissance who has been Member of Parliament for Marne's 2nd constituency in the National Assembly since a by-election in 2023.

== Political career ==
In 2022, Miller contested Marne's 2nd constituency but was defeated in the first round, coming in third place.

== Political positions ==
Miller is considered to be part of her parliamentary group's conservative wing.

== See also ==
- List of deputies of the 16th National Assembly of France
