= Bertrand Petit =

French politician

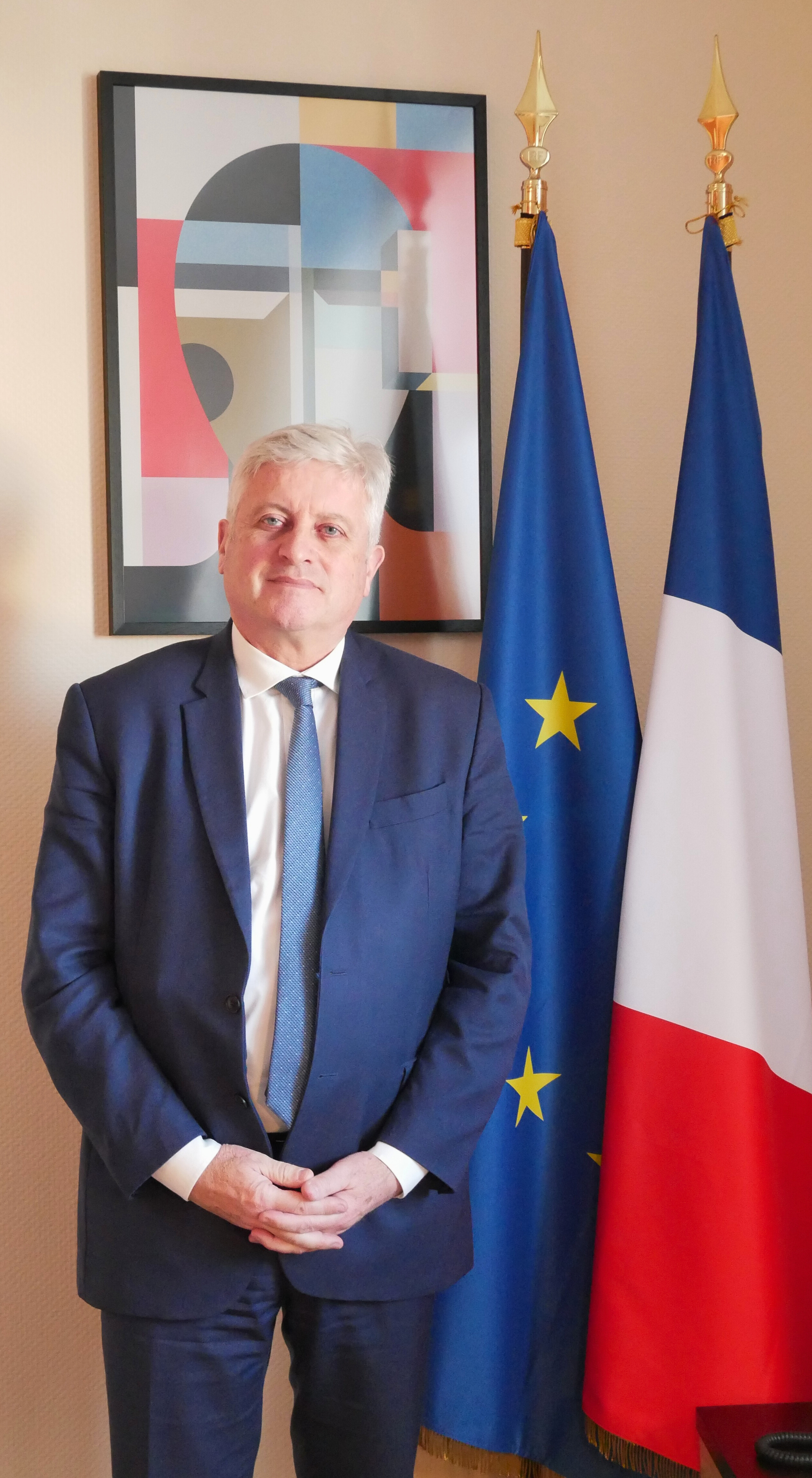

Member of the National Assembly for Pas-de-Calais's 8th constituency
- In office 30 January 2023 – 9 June 2024
- Preceded by: Vacant
- Succeeded by: Auguste Évrard
- In office 22 June 2022 – 2 December 2022
- Preceded by: Benoît Potterie
- Succeeded by: Vacant

Personal details
- Born: 28 August 1964 (age 61) Saint-Omer, France
- Party: Socialist Party

Bertrand Petit (French pronunciation: [bɛʁtʁɑ̃ pəti]; born 28 August 1964) is a French politician from the Socialist Party who served as a member of the National Assembly for Pas-de-Calais's 8th constituency from 2022 to 2024. His original election was invalidated, and he was re-elected in a by-election held in 2023.

== See also ==
- List of deputies of the 16th National Assembly of France
