= Jean-Michel Boucheron (Charente politician) =

French politician

Jean-Michel Boucheron (born 15 December 1946 in Angoulême, Charente) is a French politician, formerly a member of the National Assembly of France (1978-1988 mayor of Angoulême and briefly Secretary of State for Local Authorities. He represented Charente's 4th constituency in the Assembly, and is a member of the Socialist Party.
