= Frédéric Cuvillier =

French politician

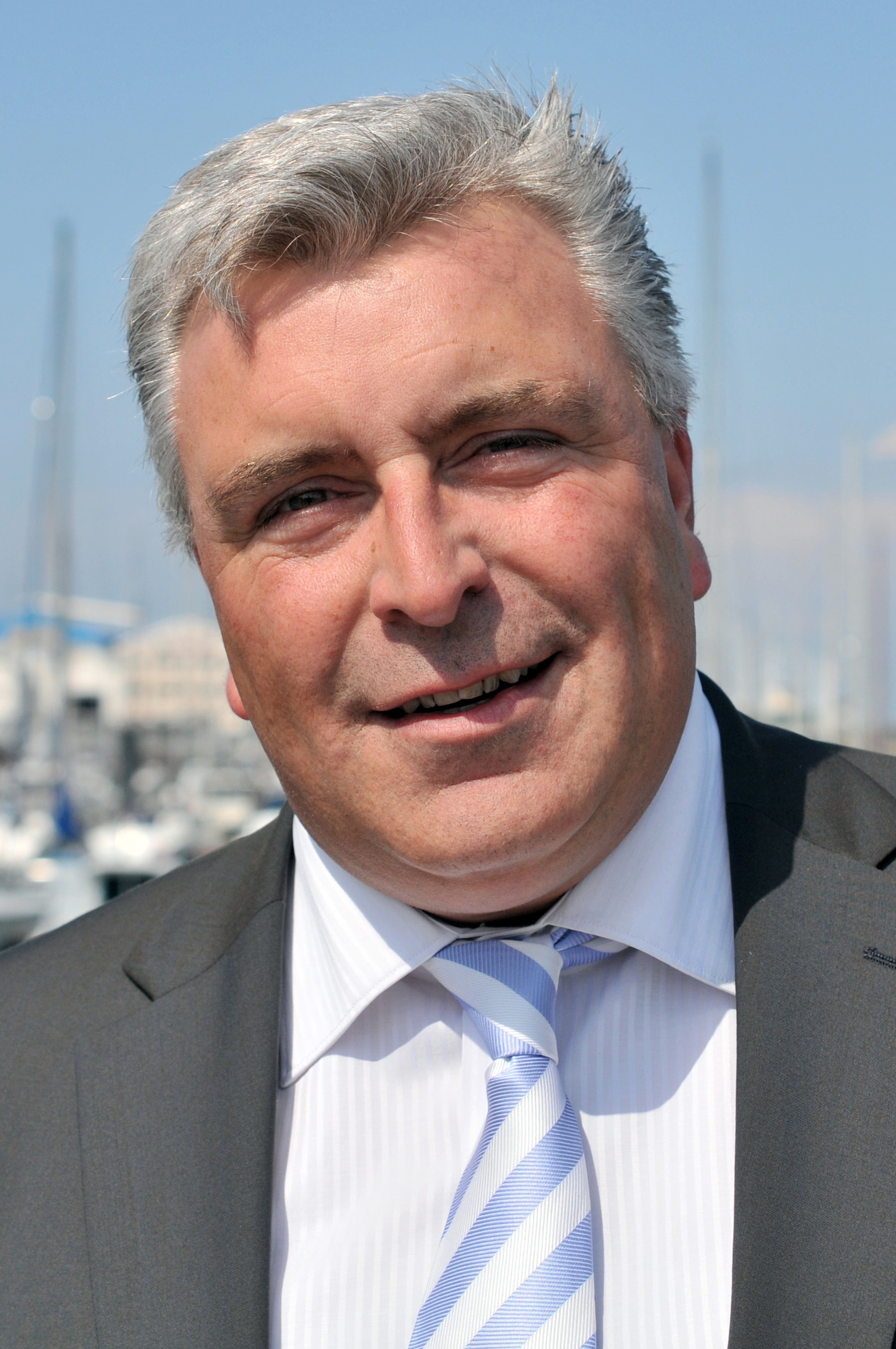
- Frédéric Cuvillier in 2007

Mayor of Boulogne-sur-Mer
- Incumbent
- Assumed office 30 March 2014

Member of the French National Assembly for Pas-de-Calais
- In office 27 September 2014 – 20 June 2017

French Junior Minister for Transport, Sea and Fisheries
- In office 16 May 2012 – 25 August 2014
- President: François Hollande
- Prime Minister: Jean-Marc Ayrault; Manuel Valls
- Preceded by: Thierry Mariani
- Succeeded by: Alain Vidalies

Personal details
- Born: 9 December 1968 (age 57) Boulogne-sur-Mer, France
- Party: Socialist Party

Frédéric Cuvillier (French pronunciation: [fʁedeʁik kyvilje]; born at Boulogne-sur-Mer on 9 December 1968) is a French politician who, until his appointment as Junior Minister for Transport and the Maritime Economy at the Ministry of Ecology, Sustainable Development, and Energy by President François Hollande on 16 May 2012, was a member of the National Assembly of France, where he represented the 5th constituency of Pas-de-Calais on behalf of the Parti Socialiste. He was mayor of Boulogne-sur-Mer from 22 November 2002 until 2012, when he became Secretary of State for Transport and the Maritime Economy.

Ahead of the Socialist Party's 2018 convention in Aubervilliers, Cuvillier publicly endorsed Stéphane Le Foll as candidate for the party's leadership.

== Career ==
National government

Secretary of State for Transport and the Maritime Economy (renamed Transport, the Sea and Fisheries) at the Ministry of Ecology, Sustainable Development, and Energy : 16 May 2012 – 25 August 2014

Elected posts

National Assembly of France

Member of the National Assembly of France for the 5th constituency of Pas-de-Calais : 2007–2012 (Became minister in 2012). Elected in 2007, re-elected in 2012.

General council

Member of the Pas-de-Calais General Council for the Canton of Le Portel : 2004–2007 (Resigned)

Agglomeration community council

Chairman of the Boulonnais Agglomeration Community : 2008–2012 (Resignation).

Vice-chairman of the Boulonnais Agglomeration Community : 1996–2008 (Re-elected in 2001)

Member Boulonnais Agglomeration Community : Since 1996. Re-elected in 2001, 2008.

Municipal council

Mayor of Boulogne-sur-Mer : 2002–2012 (Resignation). Re-elected in 2008

Deputy mayor of Boulogne-sur-Mer : 1996–2002 (Re-elected in 2001)

Member of Boulogne-sur-Mer Municipal Council : since 1996 (Re-elected in 2001, 2008)
