= René Pilato =

French politician (born 1962)

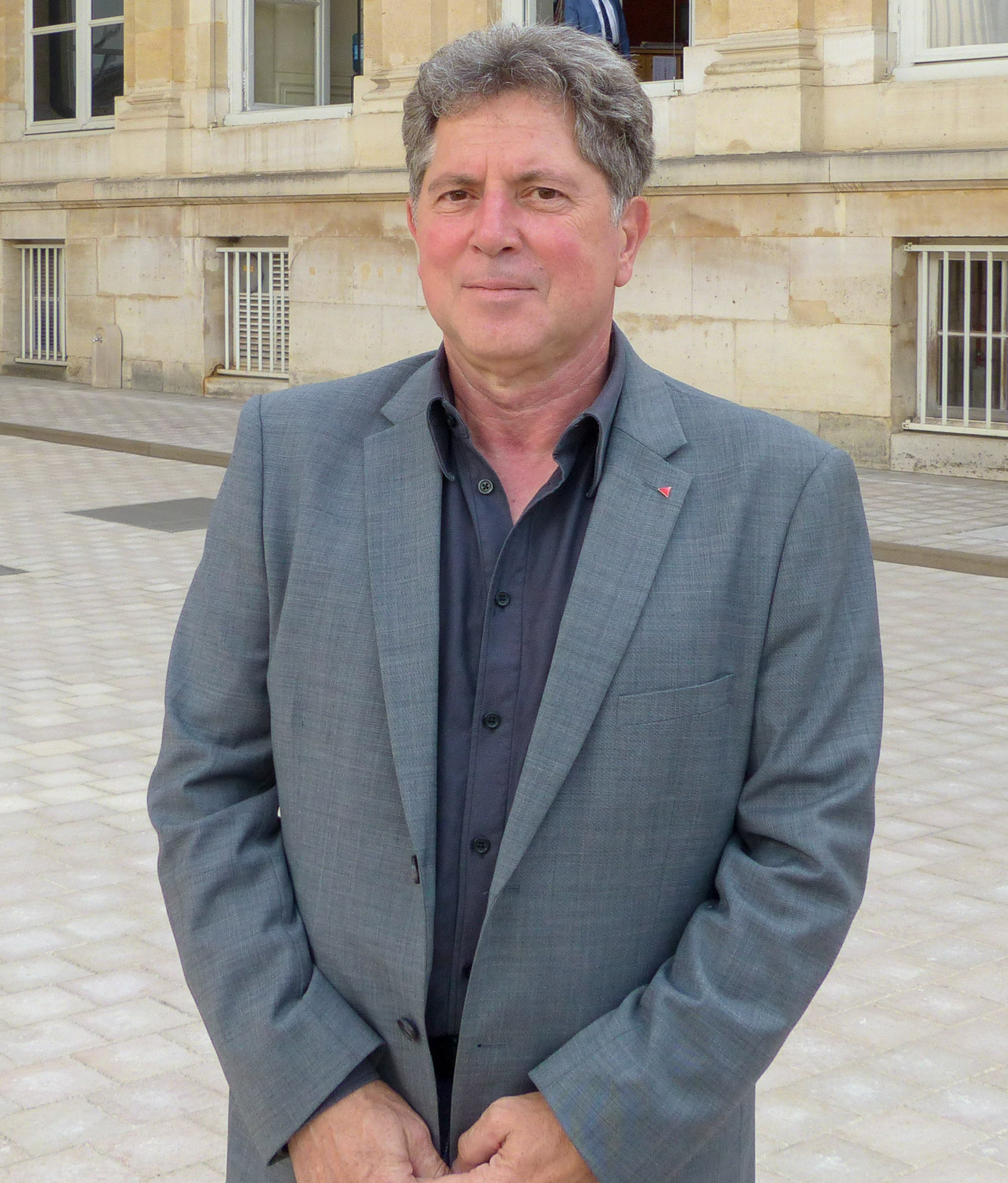

Member of the National Assembly for Charente's 1st constituency
- Incumbent
- Assumed office 30 January 2023
- Preceded by: Thomas Mesnier

Personal details
- Political party: La France Insoumise
- Profession: Mathematics teacher

René Pilato (born 31 August 1962 in Lagny-sur-Marne) is a French politician. He is a member of La France Insoumise and the deputy for Charente's 1st constituency.

== Personal life ==
Pilato is a former mathematics teacher. He has two children.
