= Frédérique Massat =

French politician

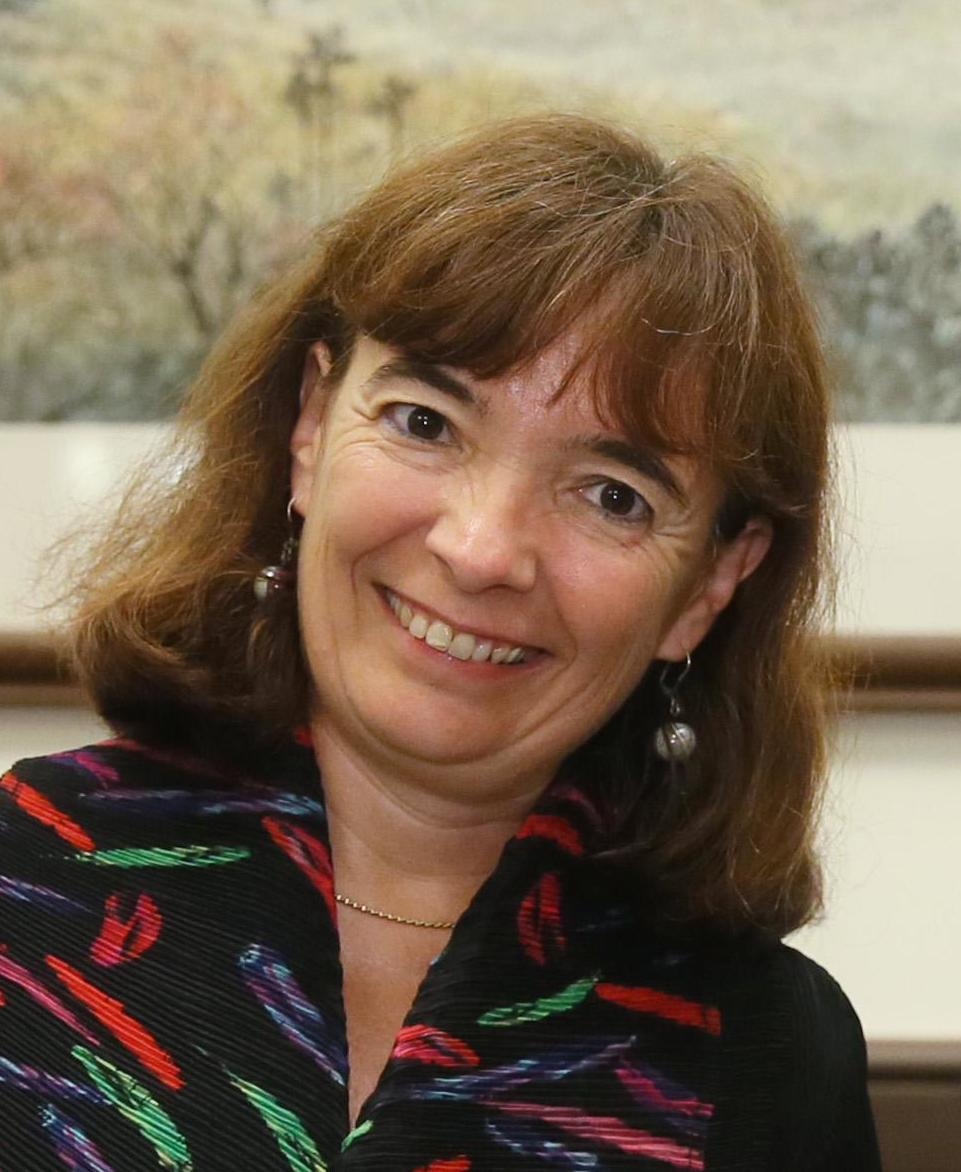
Photo of Frédérique Massat

Frédérique Massat (born 14 January 1964) was a member of the National Assembly of France. She represented the Ariège department, and is a member of the Socialist, Radical, Citizen and Miscellaneous Left.
