= Michel Lefait =

French politician (born 1946)

Michel Lefait (French pronunciation: [miʃɛl ləfɛ]; born 20 May 1946) is a member of the National Assembly of France. He represents the Pas-de-Calais department, and is a member of the Socialiste, radical, citoyen et divers gauche.
