= Thomas Mesnier =

French politician

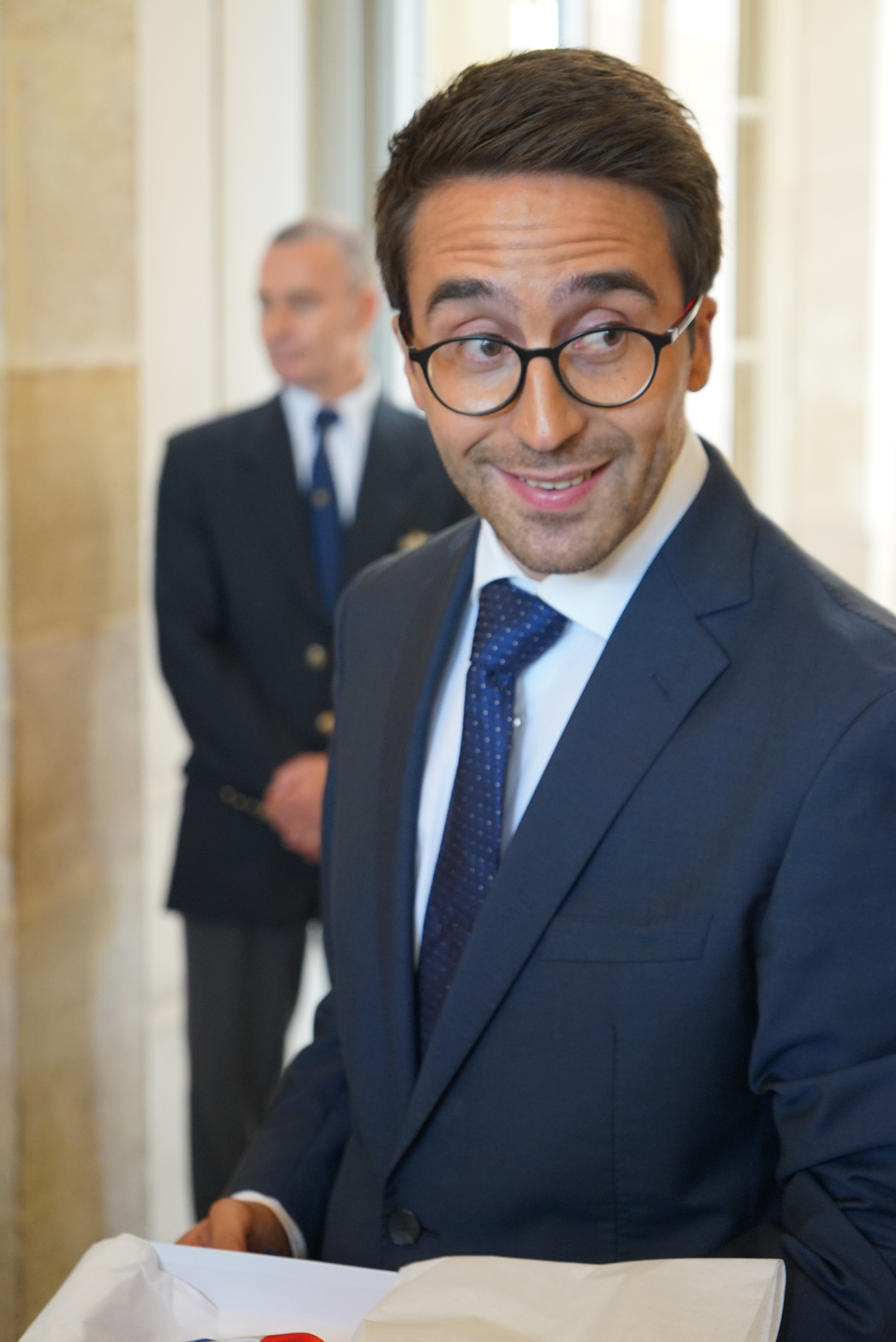

Member of the French National Assembly for Charente's 1st constituency
- In office 21 June 2017 – 2 December 2022
- Preceded by: Martine Pinville
- Succeeded by: René Pilato

Committee on Social Affairs
- In office 2019–2022

Personal details
- Born: 4 March 1986 (age 40) Barbezieux-Saint-Hilaire, France
- Party: Horizons (since 2021)
- Other political affiliations: En Marche! (2017–2021)
- Education: University of Poitiers
- Occupation: Emergency doctor

Thomas Mesnier (born 4 March 1986 in Barbezieux-Saint-Hilaire) is a French physician and politician of La République En Marche! (LREM) who served as a member of the French National Assembly from the 2017 until 2022, representing the 1st constituency of the department of Charente.

== Early life and education ==
Mesnier grew up in Juignac, Charente. During his medical studies at the University of Poitiers, he joined the National Association of Medical Students in France. In 2013, he became an emergency doctor at the Angoulême Hospital Center.

== Political career ==
A member of En Marche! in the Charente, Mesnier was elected his party's candidate for the first constituency of Charente, in the parliamentary elections of 2017. He came first in the first round with 38% of the vote, far ahead of the candidate of La France Insoumise, Martine Boutin, and outgoing deputy Martine Pinville. On 18 June 2017, he was elected with 59.95% of the votes against Martine Boutin.

In the National Assembly, Mesnier served on the Committee on Social Affairs. In this capacity, he was his parliamentary group's rapporteur on social security from 2019 to 2022.

In addition to his committee assignments, Mesnier was also a Vice-President of the French-British Parliamentary Friendship Group.

Also from November 2017, Mesnier was part of LREM's executive board under the leadership of the party's successive chairmen Christophe Castaner and Stanislas Guerini.

Mesnier was re-elected in the 2022 election. On 2 December 2022, his election was annulled by the Constitutional Council. He was defeated by René Pilato of La France Insoumise in the by-election.

== See also ==
- 2017 French legislative election
- 2022 French legislative election
