= Jean-Claude Viollet =

French politician

Jean-Claude Viollet (born 9 June 1951 in Ruelle-sur-Touvre, Charente) is a former member of the National Assembly of France. He represented the Charente department, from 1997 to 2012 and was a member of the Socialiste, radical, citoyen et divers gauche.
