= Jean-Pierre Pont =

French politician

Jean-Pierre Pont (born 9 May 1950) is a French politician of Renaissance (RE) who was elected to the National Assembly on 18 June 2017, representing the department of Pas-de-Calais.

== Political career ==
In parliament, Pont serves on the Committee on Legal Affairs and the Committee on European Affairs. In this capacity, he is the parliament's rapporteur on the public health emergency caused by the COVID-19 pandemic in France.

In addition to his committee assignments, Pont is part of the French-Eritrean Parliamentary Friendship Group, the French-Mauritian Parliamentary Friendship Group and the French-Paraguayan Parliamentary Friendship Group.

== See also ==
- 2017 French legislative election
