= List of deputies of the 15th National Assembly of France =

This article lists the deputies of the 15th legislature of the French Fifth Republic as at the end of that legislature, elected in the 2017 legislative elections, elected in by-elections, or alternates succeeding deputies. Former deputies not in the legislature at the end of its tenure are listed at the end of the table. See also the List of deputies of the 16th National Assembly of France.

== Parliamentary groups ==
Seating of the National Assembly as of 20 May 2020

Composition of the National Assembly as of 2 May 2021
Parliamentary group		Members	Related	Total	President
LREM	La République En Marche	263	4	267	Christophe Castaner
LR	The Republicans	93	8	101	Damien Abad
MoDem+	Democratic Movement and affiliated	52	5	47	Patrick Mignola
Soc+	Socialists and affiliated	25	3	28	Valérie Rabault
AE	Agir ensemble	22	0	22	Olivier Becht
UDI+	UDI and Independents	19	0	19	Jean-Christophe Lagarde
LT	Libertés and Territories	17	1	18	Bertrand Pancher
FI	La France Insoumise	17	0	17	Mathilde Panot
GDR	Democratic and Republican Left	15	0	15	André Chassaigne
NI	Non-Attached Members	–	–	23	–

== List of deputies ==
Constituency		Deputy	Date of birth	Place of birth	Portrait	Party	Group
Ain	1st	Xavier Breton	25 November 1962	France (Darney)		LR	LR
Ain	2nd	Charles de la Verpillière	31 May 1954	France (Bourg-en-Bresse)		LR	LR
Ain	3rd	Olga Givernet	17 October 1981	France (Saint-Germain-en-Laye)		LREM	LREM
Ain	4th	Stéphane Trompille	1 December 1982	France (Bourg-en-Bresse)		LREM	LREM
Ain	5th	Damien Abad	5 April 1980	France (Nîmes)		LR	LR
Aisne	1st	Aude Bono-Vandorme	3 August 1962	France (Soissons)		LREM	LREM
Aisne	2nd	Julien Dive	21 May 1985	France (Saint-Quentin)		LR	LR
Aisne	3rd	Jean-Louis Bricout	27 December 1957	France (Busigny)		PS	Soc+
Aisne	4th	Marc Delatte	24 May 1961	France (Soissons)		LREM	LREM
Aisne	5th	Jacques Krabal	10 April 1948	France (Épieds)		LREM	LREM
Allier	1st	Jean-Paul Dufrègne	28 March 1958	France (Saint-Menoux)		PCF	GDR
Allier	2nd	Laurence Vanceunebrock-Mialon	6 May 1970	France (Avion)		LREM	LREM
Allier	3rd	Bénédicte Peyrol	23 March 1991	France (Vichy)		LREM	LREM
Alpes-de-Haute-Provence	1st	Delphine Bagarry	9 January 1970	France (Lyon)		EELV	NI
Alpes-de-Haute-Provence	2nd	Christophe Castaner	3 January 1966	France (Ollioules)		LREM	LREM
Hautes-Alpes	1st	Pascale Boyer	28 September 1965	France (Saint-Mandé)		LREM	LREM
Hautes-Alpes	2nd	Claire Bouchet	9 January 1954	France (Gap)		LREM	LREM
Alpes-Maritimes	1st	Éric Ciotti	28 September 1965	France (Nice)		LR	LR
Alpes-Maritimes	2nd	Loïc Dombreval	16 April 1966	France (Boulogne-Billancourt)		LREM	LREM
Alpes-Maritimes	3rd	Cédric Roussel	10 October 1972	France (Brest)		LREM	LREM
Alpes-Maritimes	4th	Alexandra Valetta-Ardisson	7 June 1976	France (Cannes)		LREM	LREM
Alpes-Maritimes	5th	Marine Brenier	11 August 1986	France (Nice)		LR	LR
Alpes-Maritimes	6th	Laurence Trastour-Isnart	6 March 1972	France (Cagnes-sur-Mer)		LR	LR
Alpes-Maritimes	7th	Éric Pauget	18 August 1970	France (Antibes)		LR	LR
Alpes-Maritimes	8th	Bernard Brochand	5 June 1938	France (Nice)		LR	LR
Alpes-Maritimes	9th	Michèle Tabarot	13 October 1962	Spain (Alicante)		LR	LR
Ardèche	1st	Hervé Saulignac	6 November 1970	France (Privas)		PS	Soc+
Ardèche	2nd	Michèle Victory	28 October 1958	Algeria (Bône)		PS	Soc+
Ardèche	3rd	Fabrice Brun	2 April 1968	France (Avignon)		LR	LR
Ardennes	1st	Bérengère Poletti	14 October 1959	France (Biencourt-sur-Orge)		LR	LR
Ardennes	2nd	Pierre Cordier	27 May 1972	France (Charleville-Mézières)		LR	LR app.
Ardennes	3rd	Jean-Luc Warsmann	22 October 1965	France (Villers-Semeuse)		DVD	UDI+
Ariège	1st	Bénédicte Taurine	18 June 1976	France (Lavelanet)		FI	FI
Ariège	2nd	Michel Larive	22 August 1966	France (Paris 14^{e})		FI	FI
Aube	1st	Grégory Besson-Moreau	7 July 1982	France (Brou-sur-Chantereine)		LREM	LREM
Aube	2nd	Valérie Bazin-Malgras	31 October 1969	France (Romilly-sur-Seine)		LR	LR
Aube	3rd	Gérard Menuel	7 May 1952	France (Jasseines)		LR	LR
Aude	1st	Danièle Hérin	14 January 1947	France (Carcassonne)		LREM	LREM
Aude	2nd	Alain Péréa	5 June 1971	France (Narbonne)		LREM	LREM
Aude	3rd	Mireille Robert	1 March 1962	France (Orthez)		LREM	LREM
Aveyron	1st	Stéphane Mazars	25 March 1969	France (Lyon)		LREM	LREM
Aveyron	2nd	Anne Blanc	20 July 1966	France (Rodez)		LREM	LREM
Aveyron	3rd	Vacant					
Bouches-du-Rhône	1st	Valérie Boyer	11 June 1962	France (Bourges)		LR	LR
Bouches-du-Rhône	2nd	Claire Pitollat	17 September 1979	France (Marseille 7^{e})		LREM	LREM
Bouches-du-Rhône	3rd	Alexandra Louis	17 September 1983	France (Grenoble)		LREM	LREM
Bouches-du-Rhône	4th	Jean-Luc Mélenchon	19 August 1951	Morocco (Tangier)		FI	FI
Bouches-du-Rhône	5th	Cathy Racon-Bouzon	22 November 1976	France (Domont)		LREM	LREM
Bouches-du-Rhône	6th	Guy Teissier	4 April 1945	France (Marseille)		LR	LR
Bouches-du-Rhône	7th	Saïd Ahamada	7 November 1972	France (Saint-Denis)		LREM	LREM
Bouches-du-Rhône	8th	Jean-Marc Zulesi	6 June 1988	France (Marseille)		LREM	LREM
Bouches-du-Rhône	9th	Bernard Deflesselles	16 October 1953	France (Paris (6°))		LR	LR
Bouches-du-Rhône	10th	François-Michel Lambert	24 August 1966	Cuba (Havana)		LREM	LT
Bouches-du-Rhône	11th	Mohamed Laqhila	3 August 1959	Morocco (Oulmes)		MoDem	MoDem
Bouches-du-Rhône	12th	Éric Diard	21 July 1965	France (Marseille)		LR	LR
Bouches-du-Rhône	13th	Pierre Dharréville	15 June 1975	France (Nanterre)		PCF	GDR
Bouches-du-Rhône	14th	Anne-Laurence Petel	8 February 1970	France (Saint-Raphaël)		LREM	LREM
Bouches-du-Rhône	15th	Bernard Reynès	18 October 1953	Morocco (Meknes)		LR	LR
Bouches-du-Rhône	16th	Monica Michel	16 April 1955	Seychelles (Victoria)		LREM	LREM
Calvados	1st	Fabrice Le Vigoureux	27 August 1969	France (Caen)		LREM	LREM
Calvados	2nd	Laurence Dumont	2 June 1958	France (Vincennes)		PS	NG
Calvados	3rd	Sébastien Leclerc	28 March 1970	France (Lisieux)		LR	LR
Calvados	4th	Christophe Blanchet	9 April 1973	France (Caen)		LREM	LREM
Calvados	5th	Bertrand Bouyx	26 May 1970	France (Juvisy-sur-Orge)		LREM	LREM
Calvados	6th	Alain Tourret	25 December 1947	Germany (Boppard)		LREM	LREM
Cantal	1st	Vincent Descœur	13 December 1962	France (Aurillac)		LR	LR
Cantal	2nd	Jean-Yves Bony	11 March 1955	France (Aurillac)		LR	LR
Charente	1st	Thomas Mesnier	4 March 1986	France (Barbezieux-Saint-Hilaire)		LREM	LREM
Charente	2nd	Sandra Marsaud	2 January 1974	France (Périgueux)		LREM	LREM
Charente	3rd	Jérôme Lambert	7 June 1957	France (Vincennes)		PS	NG
Charente-Maritime	1st	Olivier Falorni	27 March 1972	France (Rochefort)		MR	LT
Charente-Maritime	2nd	Frédérique Tuffnell	29 June 1956	France (Châtellerault)		EDS	EDS
Charente-Maritime	3rd	Jean-Philippe Ardouin	5 March 1964	France (Saintes)		LREM	LREM
Charente-Maritime	4th	Raphaël Gérard	17 October 1968	France (Cirey-sur-Vezouze)		LREM	LREM
Charente-Maritime	5th	Didier Quentin	23 December 1946	France (Royan)		LR	LR
Cher	1st	François Cormier-Bouligeon	19 November 1972	France (Bourges)		LREM	LREM
Cher	2nd	Nadia Essayan	6 June 1957	Ivory Coast (Dimbokro)		MoDem	MoDem
Cher	3rd	Loïc Kervran	11 February 1984	France (Moulins)		LREM	LREM
Corrèze	1st	Christophe Jerretie	31 August 1979	France (Tulle)		LREM	LREM
Corrèze	2nd	Frédérique Meunier	8 December 1960	France (Paris)		LR	LR
Corse-du-Sud	1st	Jean-Jacques Ferrara	16 June 1967	France (Marseille)		LR	LR
Corse-du-Sud	2nd	Paul-André Colombani	17 August 1967	France (Bastia)		PaC	LT
Haute-Corse	1st	Michel Castellani	28 September 1945	France (Bastia)		PaC	LT
Haute-Corse	2nd	Jean-Felix Acquaviva	19 March 1973	France (Bastia)		PaC	LT
Côte-d'Or	1st	Didier Martin	20 August 1956	France (Clichy)		LREM	LREM
Côte-d'Or	2nd	Rémi Delatte	9 June 1956	France (Dijon)		LR	LR
Côte-d'Or	3rd	Fadila Khattabi	23 February 1962	France (Montbéliard)		LREM	LREM
Côte-d'Or	4th	Yolaine de Courson	14 July 1954	France (Neuilly-sur-Seine)		EDS	EDS
Côte-d'Or	5th	Didier Paris	14 February 1954	France (Paris)		LREM	LREM
Côtes-d'Armor	1st	Bruno Joncour	25 November 1953	Tunisia (Bizerte)		MoDem	MoDem
Côtes-d'Armor	2nd	Hervé Berville	15 January 1990	Rwanda (Madanzh-Buhimga)		LREM	LREM
Côtes-d'Armor	3rd	Marc Le Fur	28 November 1956	Senegal (Dakar)		LR	LR
Côtes-d'Armor	4th	Yannick Kerlogot	12 May 1970	France (Saint-Brieuc)		LREM	LREM
Côtes-d'Armor	5th	Éric Bothorel	20 October 1966	France (Paimpol)		LREM	LREM
Creuse	1st	Jean-Baptiste Moreau	14 February 1977	France (Guéret)		LREM	LREM
Dordogne	1st	Philippe Chassaing	18 May 1972	France (Albi)		LREM	LREM
Dordogne	2nd	Michel Delpon	13 August 1949	France (Lafitte)		LREM	LREM
Dordogne	3rd	Jean-Pierre Cubertafon	5 February 1948	France (Lanouaille)		MoDem	MoDem
Dordogne	4th	Jacqueline Dubois	28 May 1957	France (Fréjus)		LREM	LREM
Doubs	1st	Fannette Charvier	31 December 1984	France (Annecy)		LREM	LREM
Doubs	2nd	Éric Alauzet	7 June 1958	France (Nancy)		LREM	LREM
Doubs	3rd	Denis Sommer	23 September 1957	France (Lure)		LREM	LREM
Doubs	4th	Frédéric Barbier	30 August 1960	France (Audincourt)		LREM	LREM
Doubs	5th	Annie Genevard	7 September 1956	France (Audincourt)		LR	LR
Drôme	1st	Mireille Clapot	14 October 1963	France (Belley)		LREM	LREM
Drôme	2nd	Alice Thourot	12 October 1985	France (Bar-le-Duc)		LREM	LREM
Drôme	3rd	Célia de Lavergne	21 November 1979	France (Clamart)		LREM	LREM
Drôme	4th	Emmanuelle Anthoine	2 July 1964	France (Saint-Vallier)		LR	LR
Eure	1st	Séverine Gipson	13 December 1970	France (Évreux)		LREM	LREM
Eure	2nd	Fabien Gouttefarde	27 September 1978	France (Versailles)		LREM	LREM
Eure	3rd	Marie Tamarelle-Verhaeghe	27 September 1962	France (Le Petit-Quevilly)		LREM	LREM
Eure	4th	Bruno Questel	21 December 1966	France (Bourg-Achard)		LREM	LREM
Eure	5th	Claire O'Petit	15 October 1949	France (Épinay-sur-Seine)		LREM	LREM
Eure-et-Loir	1st	Guillaume Kasbarian	28 February 1987	France (Marseille)		LREM	LREM
Eure-et-Loir	2nd	Olivier Marleix	6 February 1971	France (Boulogne-Billancourt)		LR	LR
Eure-et-Loir	3rd	Laure de La Raudière	12 February 1965	France (Neuilly-sur-Seine)		LR–Agir	UAI
Eure-et-Loir	4th	Philippe Vigier	3 February 1958	France (Valence)		LC	LT
Finistère	1st	Annaïg Le Meur	29 April 1973	France (Brest)		LREM	LREM
Finistère	2nd	Jean-Charles Larsonneur	24 January 1984	France (Brest)		LREM	LREM
Finistère	3rd	Didier Le Gac	19 July 1965	France (Castres)		LREM	LREM
Finistère	4th	Sandrine Le Feur	18 March 1991	France (Saint-Brieuc)		LREM	LREM
Finistère	5th	Graziella Melchior	6 April 1960	France (Brest)		LREM	LREM
Finistère	6th	Richard Ferrand	1 July 1962	France (Rodez)		LREM	LREM
Finistère	7th	Liliane Tanguy	12 March 1967	Serbia (Pančevo)		LREM	LREM
Finistère	8th	Erwan Balanant	21 February 1971	France (Lorient)		LREM	MoDem
Gard	1st	Françoise Dumas	12 April 1960	France (Alès)		LREM	LREM
Gard	2nd	Gilbert Collard	3 February 1948	France (Marseille)		FN	NI
Gard	3rd	Anthony Cellier	1 June 1975	France (Pierrelatte)		LREM	LREM
Gard	4th	Annie Chapelier	7 November 1967	Canada (Windsor)		EDS	EDS
Gard	5th	Olivier Gaillard	28 February 1967	France (Nîmes)		LREM	LREM
Gard	6th	Philippe Berta	11 April 1960	France (Besançon)		MoDem	MoDem
Haute-Garonne	1st	Pierre Cabaré	12 December 1957	France (Toulouse)		LRC–Cap21	LREM
Haute-Garonne	2nd	Jean-Luc Lagleize	9 September 1958	France (Tarbes)		MoDem	MoDem
Haute-Garonne	3rd	Corinne Vignon	10 June 1963	France (Agen)		LREM	LREM
Haute-Garonne	4th	Mickaël Nogal	26 November 1990	France (Toulouse)		LREM	LREM
Haute-Garonne	5th	Jean-François Portarrieu	14 October 1965	France (Toulouse)		LREM	LREM
Haute-Garonne	6th	Monique Iborra	8 March 1945	Algeria (El Harrach)		LREM	LREM
Haute-Garonne	7th	Élisabeth Toutut-Picard	17 December 1954	Algeria (Blida)		LREM	LREM
Haute-Garonne	8th	Joël Aviragnet (Note: Aviragnet's election was annulled by the Constitutional Council on 18 December 2017. He was re-elected in the subsequent by-election)	16 June 1956	France (Encausse-les-Thermes)		PS	NG
Haute-Garonne	9th	Sandrine Mörch	13 November 1961	France (Issy-les-Moulineaux)		LREM	LREM
Haute-Garonne	10th	Sébastien Nadot	8 July 1972	France (Fleurance)		MdP	EDS
Gers	1st	Jean-René Cazeneuve	9 June 1958	France (Paris)		LREM	LREM
Gers	2nd	Gisèle Biémouret	16 June 1952	France (Fleurance)		PS	NG
Gironde	1st	Dominique David	27 February 1963	France (Montpellier)		LREM	LREM
Gironde	2nd	Catherine Fabre	19 September 1978	France (Toulouse)		LREM	LREM
Gironde	3rd	Loïc Prud'homme	19 August 1969	France (Bègles)		FI	FI
Gironde	4th	Alain David	2 June 1949	France (Libourne)		PS	NG
Gironde	5th	Benoît Simian	27 May 1983	France (Bordeaux)		LREM	LREM
Gironde	6th	Éric Poulliat	9 July 1974	France (Bordeaux)		LREM	LREM
Gironde	7th	Bérangère Couillard	24 July 1986	France (Rennes)		LREM	LREM
Gironde	8th	Sophie Panonacle	16 December 1968	France (Bordeaux)		LREM	LREM
Gironde	9th	Sophie Mette	13 September 1959	France (Montauban)		MoDem	MoDem
Gironde	10th	Florent Boudié	22 September 1973	France (Sainte-Foy-la-Grande)		LREM	LREM
Gironde	11th	Véronique Hammerer	4 November 1968	France (Dax)		LREM	LREM
Gironde	12th	Christelle Dubos	26 March 1976	France (Le Coteau)		LREM	LREM
Hérault	1st	Patricia Mirallès	22 August 1967	France (Montpellier)		LREM	LREM
Hérault	2nd	Muriel Ressiguier	21 December 1977	France (Châteauroux)		FI	FI
Hérault	3rd	Coralie Dubost	4 March 1983	France (Montpellier)		LREM	LREM
Hérault	4th	Jean-François Eliaou	13 August 1956	France (Nice)		LREM	LREM
Hérault	5th	Philippe Huppé	12 February 1968	France (Mazamet)		LREM	LREM
Hérault	6th	Emmanuelle Ménard	15 August 1968	France (Lille)		FN	NI
Hérault	7th	Christophe Euzet	2 April 1967	France (Perpignan)		LREM	LREM
Hérault	8th	Nicolas Démoulin	22 July 1972	France (Bordeaux)		LREM	LREM
Hérault	9th	Patrick Vignal	22 January 1958	France (Montpellier)		LREM	LREM
Ille-et-Vilaine	1st	Mostapha Laabid	29 March 1969	France (Rennes)		LREM	LREM
Ille-et-Vilaine	2nd	Laurence Maillart-Méhaignerie	5 April 1967	France (Paris 12^{e})		AC	LREM
Ille-et-Vilaine	3rd	François André	19 July 1967	France (Pontivy)		PS	LREM app.
Ille-et-Vilaine	4th	Gaël Le Bohec	4 November 1977	France (Saint-Brieuc)		LREM	LREM
Ille-et-Vilaine	5th	Christine Cloarec	28 October 1964	France (Noisy-le-Sec)		LREM	LREM
Ille-et-Vilaine	6th	Thierry Benoit	13 September 1966	France (Fougères)		UDI	UAI
Ille-et-Vilaine	7th	Gilles Lurton	6 July 1963	France (Saint-Servan)		LR	LR
Ille-et-Vilaine	8th	Florian Bachelier	5 April 1979	France (Thionville)		LREM	LREM
Indre	1st	François Jolivet	21 March 1966	France (Châteauroux)		LREM	LREM
Indre	2nd	Nicolas Forissier	17 February 1961	France (Paris)		LR	LR
Indre-et-Loire	1st	Philippe Chalumeau	8 November 1963	France (Rochefort)		LREM	LREM
Indre-et-Loire	2nd	Daniel Labaronne	16 July 1955	France (Paris)		LREM	LREM
Indre-et-Loire	3rd	Sophie Auconie	19 August 1963	France (Dugny)		UDI	UAI
Indre-et-Loire	4th	Fabienne Colboc	9 August 1971	France (Thiais)		LREM	LREM
Indre-et-Loire	5th	Sabine Thillaye	18 May 1959	Germany (Remscheid)		EDS	EDS
Isère	1st	Camille Galliard-Minier	26 May 1975	France (La Tronche)		LREM	LREM
Isère	2nd	Jean-Charles Colas-Roy	2 May 1978	France (Montpellier)		LREM	LREM
Isère	3rd	Émilie Chalas	18 October 1977	France (Échirolles)		LREM	LREM
Isère	4th	Marie-Noëlle Battistel	20 August 1956	France (Grenoble)		PS	NG
Isère	5th	Catherine Kamowski	8 April 1958	France (Valenciennes)		LREM	LREM
Isère	6th	Cendra Motin	29 January 1975	France (Bagnols-sur-Cèze)		LREM	LREM
Isère	7th	Monique Limon	5 December 1953	France (Paris)		LREM	LREM
Isère	8th	Caroline Abadie	7 September 1976	France (Saint-Martin-d'Hères)		LREM	LREM
Isère	9th	Élodie Jacquier-Laforge	15 April 1978	France (Grenoble)		MoDem	MoDem
Isère	10th	Marjolaine Meynier-Millefert	30 September 1982	France (Échirolles)		LREM	LREM
Jura	1st	Danielle Brulebois	4 July 1947	France (Longwy-sur-le-Doubs)		LREM	LREM
Jura	2nd	Marie-Christine Dalloz	10 January 1958	France (Saint-Claude)		LR	LR
Jura	3rd	Jean-Marie Sermier	5 March 1961	France (Nozeroy)		LR	LR
Landes	1st	Fabien Lainé	15 April 1976	France (Arcachon)		UDI	MoDem
Landes	2nd	Lionel Causse	6 May 1971	France (Toulouse)		LREM	LREM
Landes	3rd	Boris Vallaud	25 July 1975	Lebanon (Beirut)		PS	NG
Loir-et-Cher	1st	Marc Fesneau	11 January 1971	France (Paris 15^{e})		MoDem	MoDem
Loir-et-Cher	2nd	Guillaume Peltier	27 August 1976	France (Paris 14^{e})		R!	R!
Loir-et-Cher	3rd	Maurice Leroy	2 February 1959	France (Paris)		UDI	UAI
Loire	1st	Régis Juanico	5 February 1972	France (Saint-Rémy)		Génération.s	NG
Loire	2nd	Jean-Michel Mis	28 July 1967	France (Saint-Étienne)		LREM	LREM
Loire	3rd	Valéria Faure-Muntian	2 September 1984	Ukraine (Kiliya)		LREM	LREM
Loire	4th	Dino Cinieri	9 July 1955	France (Firminy)		LR	LR
Loire	5th	Nathalie Sarles	17 April 1962	France (Valence)		LREM	LREM
Loire	6th	Julien Borowczyk	2 May 1979	France (Montbrison)		LREM	LREM
Haute-Loire	1st	Isabelle Valentin	20 January 1962	France (Le Puy-en-Velay)		LR	LR
Haute-Loire	2nd	Jean-Pierre Vigier	22 October 1969	France (Brioude)		LR	LR
Loire-Atlantique	1st	Mounir Belhamiti	8 March 1985	France (Nantes)		LREM	LREM
Loire-Atlantique	2nd	Valérie Oppelt	10 December 1973	France (Nantes)		LREM	LREM
Loire-Atlantique	3rd	Anne-France Brunet	12 June 1962	France (Saint-Maur-des-Fossés)		LREM	LREM
Loire-Atlantique	4th	Aude Amadou	29 February 1980	France (Coutances)		LREM	LREM
Loire-Atlantique	5th	Luc Geismar	1 November 1966	France (Colmar)		MoDem	MoDem
Loire-Atlantique	6th	Yves Daniel	31 July 1954	France (Mouais)		LREM	LREM
Loire-Atlantique	7th	Sandrine Josso	19 September 1975	France (Guérande)		LREM	LREM
Loire-Atlantique	8th	Audrey Dufeu-Schubert	3 June 1980	France (Saint-Nazaire)		LREM	LREM
Loire-Atlantique	9th	Yannick Haury	12 June 1954	France (Nantes)		LREM	LREM
Loire-Atlantique	10th	Sophie Errante	22 July 1971	France (Nantes)		LREM	LREM
Loiret	1st	Stéphanie Rist	6 August 1973	France (Athis-Mons)		LREM	LREM
Loiret	2nd	Caroline Janvier	9 March 1982	France (Nantes)		LREM	LREM
Loiret	3rd	Claude de Ganay	5 September 1953	France (Paris)		LR	LR
Loiret	4th	Jean-Pierre Door (Note: Door's election was annulled by the Constitutional Council on 18 December 2017. He was re-elected in the subsequent by-election)	1 April 1942	France (Sully-sur-Loire)		LR	LR
Loiret	5th	Marianne Dubois	17 December 1957	France (Corbeil-Essonnes)		LR	LR
Loiret	6th	Richard Ramos	23 March 1968	France (Blois)		MoDem	MoDem
Lot	1st	Aurélien Pradié	14 March 1986	France (Cahors)		LR	LR
Lot	2nd	Huguette Tiegna	1 April 1982	Burkina Faso (Bangassogo)		LREM	LREM
Lot-et-Garonne	1st	Michel Lauzzana	20 March 1957	France (Castelsarrasin)		LREM	LREM
Lot-et-Garonne	2nd	Alexandre Freschi	17 May 1979	France (Marmande)		LREM	LREM
Lot-et-Garonne	3rd	Olivier Damaisin	5 August 1966	France (Romans-sur-Isère)		LREM	LREM
Lozère	1st	Pierre Morel-À-L'Huissier	21 December 1958	France (Strasbourg)		LR	UDI+
Maine-et-Loire	1st	Matthieu Orphelin	3 December 1972	France (Saint-Nazaire)		EDS	EDS
Maine-et-Loire	2nd	Stella Dupont	3 November 1973	France (Angers)		LREM	LREM
Maine-et-Loire	3rd	Jean-Charles Taugourdeau	17 July 1953	France (Dreux)		LR	LR
Maine-et-Loire	4th	Laëtitia Saint-Paul	21 January 1981	France (Chartres)		LREM	LREM
Maine-et-Loire	5th	Denis Masséglia	11 April 1981	France (Nice)		LREM	LREM
Maine-et-Loire	6th	Nicole Dubré-Chirat	18 December 1951	France (Angers)		LRC–Cap21	LREM
Maine-et-Loire	7th	Philippe Bolo	25 March 1967	France (Limoges)		MoDem	MoDem
Manche	1st	Philippe Gosselin	23 October 1966	France (Carentan)		LR	LR
Manche	2nd	Bertrand Sorre	8 May 1965	France (Cherbourg)		LREM	LREM
Manche	3rd	Grégory Galbadon	21 January 1973	France (Coutances)		LREM	LREM
Manche	4th	Sonia Krimi	20 December 1982	Tunisia (Tunis)		Independent	LREM
Marne	1st	Valérie Beauvais	8 March 1963	France (Nevers)		LR	LR
Marne	2nd	Aina Kuric	15 May 1987	France (Creil)		LREM	LREM
Marne	3rd	Éric Girardin	12 February 1962	France (Sézanne)		LREM	LREM
Marne	4th	Lise Magnier	31 December 1984	France (Châlons-en-Champagne)		LR–Agir	UAI
Marne	5th	Charles de Courson	2 April 1952	France (Paris 16^{e})		LC	LT
Haute-Marne	1st	Bérangère Abba	22 October 1976	France (Chaumont)		LREM	LREM
Haute-Marne	2nd	François Cornut-Gentille	22 May 1958	France (Saint-Mandé)		LR	LR
Mayenne	1st	Guillaume Garot	29 May 1966	France (Laval)		PS	NG
Mayenne	2nd	Géraldine Bannier	22 November 1979	France (Laval)		MoDem	MoDem
Mayenne	3rd	Yannick Favennec	12 August 1958	France (Chaudron-en-Mauges)		UDI	LT
Meurthe-et-Moselle	1st	Carole Grandjean	18 May 1983	France (Suresnes)		LREM	LREM
Meurthe-et-Moselle	2nd	Laurent Garcia	31 May 1970	France (Paris 16^{e})		MoDem	MoDem app.
Meurthe-et-Moselle	3rd	Xavier Paluszkiewicz	13 December 1972	France (Villerupt)		LREM	LREM
Meurthe-et-Moselle	4th	Thibault Bazin	27 October 1984	France (Nancy)		LR	LR
Meurthe-et-Moselle	5th	Dominique Potier	17 March 1964	France (Toul)		PS	NG
Meurthe-et-Moselle	6th	Caroline Fiat	28 January 1977	France (Verdun)		Ensemble!	FI
Meuse	1st	Bertrand Pancher	5 June 1958	France (Saint-Mihiel)		MR	LT
Meuse	2nd	Émilie Cariou	14 October 1971	France (Verdun)		EDS	EDS
Morbihan	1st	Hervé Pellois	17 April 1951	France (La Chapelle-Blanche)		LREM	LREM
Morbihan	2nd	Jimmy Pahun	15 May 1962	France (Paris)		SE	MoDem app.
Morbihan	3rd	Nicole Le Peih	28 September 1959	France (Pontivy)		LREM	LREM
Morbihan	4th	Paul Molac	21 May 1962	France (Ploërmel)		LREM	LT
Morbihan	5th	Gwendal Rouillard	20 April 1976	France (Pontivy)		LREM	LREM
Morbihan	6th	Jean-Michel Jacques	29 February 1968	France (Metz)		LREM	LREM
Moselle	1st	Belkhir Belhaddad	9 July 1969	Algeria (Timgad)		LREM	LREM
Moselle	2nd	Ludovic Mendes	11 April 1987	France (Metz)		LREM	LREM
Moselle	3rd	Richard Lioger	18 September 1957	France (Paris 10^{e})		LREM	LREM
Moselle	4th	Fabien Di Filippo	23 August 1986	France (Sarrebourg)		LR	LR
Moselle	5th	Nicole Gries-Trisse	29 June 1963	France (Sarreguemines)		LREM	LREM
Moselle	6th	Christophe Arend	12 August 1975	France (Forbach)		LREM	LREM
Moselle	7th	Hélène Zannier	19 September 1972	France (Saint-Avold)		LREM	LREM
Moselle	8th	Brahim Hammouche	17 May 1971	Algeria (Semaoune)		MoDem	MoDem
Moselle	9th	Isabelle Rauch	10 August 1968	France (Villers-Semeuse)		LREM	LREM
Nièvre	1st	Perrine Goulet	19 March 1978	France (Nevers)		LREM	LREM
Nièvre	2nd	Patrice Perrot	24 February 1964	France (Decize)		LREM	LREM
Nord	1st	Adrien Quatennens	23 May 1990	France (Lille)		FI	FI
Nord	2nd	Ugo Bernalicis	25 September 1989	France (Arras)		FI	FI
Nord	3rd	Christophe Di Pompeo	15 July 1964	France (Hautmont)		LREM	LREM
Nord	4th	Brigitte Liso	29 July 1959	France (Lille)		LREM	LREM
Nord	5th	Sébastien Huyghe	25 October 1969	France (Béthune)		LR	LR
Nord	6th	Charlotte Lecocq	17 July 1977	France (Pointe-à-Pitre)		LREM	LREM
Nord	7th	Francis Vercamer	10 May 1958	France (Lille)		LC	UAI
Nord	8th	Catherine Osson	7 February 1974	France (Croix)		LREM	LREM
Nord	9th	Valérie Petit	23 June 1976	France (Meaux)		LREM	LREM
Nord	10th	Vincent Ledoux	21 June 1966	Belgium (Watermael-Boitsfort)		LR–Agir	UAI
Nord	11th	Laurent Pietraszewski	19 November 1966	France (Saint-Denis)		LREM	LREM
Nord	12th	Anne-Laure Cattelot	25 October 1988	France (Maubeuge)		LREM	LREM
Nord	13th	Christian Hutin	18 January 1961	France (Lille)		MRC	NG app.
Nord	14th	Paul Christophe	10 February 1971	France (Les Sables-d'Olonne)		LR–Agir	UAI
Nord	15th	Jennifer de Temmerman	16 February 1977	France (Valenciennes)		EDS	EDS
Nord	16th	Alain Bruneel	7 March 1952	France (Tourcoing)		PCF	GDR
Nord	17th	Dimitri Houbron	12 February 1991	France (Roubaix)		LREM	LREM
Nord	18th	Guy Bricout	18 February 1944	France (Caudry)		UDI	UAI
Nord	19th	Sébastien Chenu	13 April 1973	France (Beauvais)		FN	NI
Nord	20th	Fabien Roussel	16 April 1969	France (Béthune)		PCF	GDR
Nord	21st	Béatrice Descamps	24 April 1961	France (Valenciennes)		UDI	UAI
Oise	1st	Olivier Dassault	1 June 1951	France (Boulogne-Billancourt)		LR	LR
Oise	2nd	Agnès Thill	2 June 1964	France (Paris (14°))		LREM	LREM
Oise	3rd	Pascal Bois	3 December 1959	France (Paris)		LREM	LREM
Oise	4th	Éric Woerth	29 January 1956	France (Creil)		LR	LR
Oise	5th	Pierre Vatin	21 August 1967	France (Saint-Quentin)		LR	LR
Oise	6th	Carole Bureau-Bonnard	9 August 1965	France (La Fère)		LREM	LREM
Oise	7th	Maxime Minot	20 July 1987	France (Clermont)		LR	LR
Orne	1st	Chantal Jourdan	2 September 1958	France (Alençon)		PS	NG
Orne	2nd	Véronique Louwagie	20 March 1961	France (Buis-sur-Damville)		LR	LR
Orne	3rd	Jérôme Nury	25 August 1972	France (Valence)		LR	LR
Pas-de-Calais	1st	Bruno Duvergé	3 April 1957	France (Cambrai)		MoDem	MoDem
Pas-de-Calais	2nd	Jacqueline Maquet	13 May 1949	France (Estrée-Blanche)		LREM	LREM
Pas-de-Calais	3rd	José Évrard	17 July 1945	France (Cauchy-à-la-Tour)		LP	NI
Pas-de-Calais	4th	Daniel Fasquelle	16 January 1963	France (Saint-Omer)		LR	LR
Pas-de-Calais	5th	Jean-Pierre Pont	9 May 1950	France (Le Portel)		LREM	LREM
Pas-de-Calais	6th	Brigitte Bourguignon	21 March 1959	France (Boulogne-sur-Mer)		LREM	LREM
Pas-de-Calais	7th	Pierre-Henri Dumont	7 October 1987	France (Grande-Synthe)		LR	LR
Pas-de-Calais	8th	Benoît Potterie	23 July 1967	France (Calais)		LREM	LREM
Pas-de-Calais	9th	Marguerite Deprez-Audebert	17 May 1952	France (Béthune)		MoDem	MoDem
Pas-de-Calais	10th	Ludovic Pajot	18 November 1993	France (Beuvry)		FN	NI
Pas-de-Calais	11th	Marine Le Pen	5 August 1968	France (Neuilly-sur-Seine)		FN	NI
Pas-de-Calais	12th	Bruno Bilde	22 September 1976	France (Laxou)		FN	NI
Puy-de-Dôme	1st	Valérie Thomas	21 January 1968	France (Désertines)		LREM	LREM
Puy-de-Dôme	2nd	Christine Pirès-Beaune	6 October 1964	France (Saint-Georges-de-Mons)		PS	NG
Puy-de-Dôme	3rd	Laurence Vichnievsky	5 February 1955	France (Boulogne-Billancourt)		MoDem	MoDem
Puy-de-Dôme	4th	Michel Fanget	3 May 1950	France (Clermont-Ferrand)		MoDem	MoDem
Puy-de-Dôme	5th	André Chassaigne	2 July 1950	France (Clermont-Ferrand)		PCF	GDR
Pyrénées-Atlantiques	1st	Josy Poueyto	13 January 1954	France (Paris (4°))		MoDem	MoDem
Pyrénées-Atlantiques	2nd	Jean-Paul Mattei	21 March 1954	Germany (Saarburg)		MoDem	MoDem
Pyrénées-Atlantiques	3rd	David Habib	16 March 1961	France (Paris)		PS	NG
Pyrénées-Atlantiques	4th	Jean Lassalle	3 May 1955	France (Lourdios-Ichère)		Résistons!	NI
Pyrénées-Atlantiques	5th	Florence Lasserre-David	29 June 1974	France (Bayonne)		MoDem	MoDem
Pyrénées-Atlantiques	6th	Vincent Bru	29 April 1955	France (Bayonne)		MoDem	MoDem app.
Hautes-Pyrénées	1st	Jean-Bernard Sempastous	5 August 1964	France (Bagnères-de-Bigorre)		LREM	LREM
Hautes-Pyrénées	2nd	Jeanine Dubié	3 January 1958	France (Lourdes)		MR	LT
Pyrénées-Orientales	1st	Romain Grau	21 June 1974	France (Perpignan)		LREM	LREM
Pyrénées-Orientales	2nd	Louis Aliot	4 September 1969	France (Toulouse)		FN	NI
Pyrénées-Orientales	3rd	Laurence Gayte	25 September 1965	France (Paris 13^{e})		LREM	LREM
Pyrénées-Orientales	4th	Sébastien Cazenove	28 December 1976	France (Perpignan)		LREM	LREM
Bas-Rhin	1st	Thierry Michels	27 August 1960	France (Strasbourg)		LREM	LREM
Bas-Rhin	2nd	Sylvain Waserman	8 December 1967	France (Paris (7°))		MoDem	MoDem
Bas-Rhin	3rd	Bruno Studer	18 June 1978	France (Colmar)		LREM	LREM
Bas-Rhin	4th	Martine Wonner	27 March 1964	France (Hayange)		EDS	EDS
Bas-Rhin	5th	Antoine Herth	14 February 1963	France (Sélestat)		LR–Agir	UAI
Bas-Rhin	6th	Laurent Furst	19 May 1965	France (Colmar)		LR	LR
Bas-Rhin	7th	Patrick Hetzel	2 July 1964	France (Phalsbourg)		LR	LR
Bas-Rhin	8th	Frédéric Reiss	12 November 1949	France (Haguenau)		LR	LR
Bas-Rhin	9th	Vincent Thiébaut	23 May 1972	France (Toulouse)		LREM	LREM
Haut-Rhin	1st	Yves Hemedinger	23 October 1965	France (Colmar)		LR	LR
Haut-Rhin	2nd	Jacques Cattin	4 June 1958	France (Colmar)		LR	LR
Haut-Rhin	3rd	Jean-Luc Reitzer	29 December 1951	France (Altkirch)		LR	LR
Haut-Rhin	4th	Raphaël Schellenberger	14 February 1990	France (Mulhouse)		LR	LR
Haut-Rhin	5th	Olivier Becht	28 April 1976	France (Strasbourg)		Agir	UAI
Haut-Rhin	6th	Bruno Fuchs	7 April 1959	France (Colmar)		LREM	MoDem app.
Rhône	1st	Thomas Rudigoz	11 January 1971	France (Lyon)		LREM	LREM
Rhône	2nd	Hubert Julien-Laferrière	27 February 1966	France (Boulogne-Billancourt)		EDS	EDS
Rhône	3rd	Jean-Louis Touraine	8 October 1945	France (Lyon 3^{e})		LREM	LREM
Rhône	4th	Anne Brugnera	28 November 1970	France (Versailles)		LREM	LREM
Rhône	5th	Blandine Brocard	3 November 1981	France (Strasbourg)		LREM	LREM
Rhône	6th	Bruno Bonnell	6 October 1958	Algeria (Algiers)		LREM	LREM
Rhône	7th	Anissa Khedher	1 April 1980	France (Vénissieux)		LREM	LREM
Rhône	8th	Patrice Verchère	29 December 1973	France (Le Coteau)		LR	LR
Rhône	9th	Bernard Perrut	24 January 1957	France (Villefranche-sur-Saône)		LR	LR
Rhône	10th	Thomas Gassilloud	21 May 1981	France (Saint-Symphorien-sur-Coise)		LREM	LREM
Rhône	11th	Jean-Luc Fugit	27 November 1969	France (Rodez)		LREM	LREM
Rhône	12th	Cyrille Isaac-Sibille	30 April 1958	France (Lyon (6°))		MoDem	MoDem
Rhône	13th	Danièle Cazarian	31 August 1965	France (Lyon (7°))		LREM	LREM
Rhône	14th	Yves Blein	12 October 1954	France (Lyon)		LREM	LREM
Haute-Saône	1st	Barbara Bessot Ballot	13 April 1972	France (Besançon)		LREM	LREM
Haute-Saône	2nd	Christophe Lejeune	22 March 1969	France (Luxeuil-les-Bains)		LREM	LREM
Saône-et-Loire	1st	Benjamin Dirx	25 January 1979	France (Villefranche-sur-Saône)		LREM	LREM
Saône-et-Loire	2nd	Josiane Corneloup	30 September 1959	France (Le Creusot)		LR	LR
Saône-et-Loire	3rd	Rémy Rebeyrotte	27 March 1966	France (Autun)		LRC–Cap21	LREM
Saône-et-Loire	4th	Cécile Untermaier	28 December 1951	France (Belley)		PS	NG
Saône-et-Loire	5th	Raphaël Gauvain	10 April 1973	France (Paris (14°))		LREM	LREM
Sarthe	1st	Damien Pichereau	28 January 1988	France (Mamers)		LREM	LREM
Sarthe	2nd	Marietta Karamanli	18 December 1964	Greece (Athens)		PS	NG
Sarthe	3rd	Pascale Fontenel-Personne	26 May 1962	France (Le Mans)		LREM	LREM
Sarthe	4th	Sylvie Tolmont	9 October 1962	France (Le Mans)		PS	NG
Sarthe	5th	Jean-Carles Grelier	15 March 1966	France (Le Mans)		LR	LR
Savoie	1st	Typhanie Degois	6 January 1993	France (Fourmies)		LREM	LREM
Savoie	2nd	Vincent Rolland	1 February 1970	France (Moûtiers)		LR	LR
Savoie	3rd	Émilie Bonnivard	2 August 1980	France (Chambéry)		LR	LR
Savoie	4th	Patrick Mignola	8 August 1971	France (Chambéry)		MoDem	MoDem
Haute-Savoie	1st	Véronique Riotton	2 November 1969	France (Bonneville)		LREM	LREM
Haute-Savoie	2nd	Frédérique Lardet	1 September 1966	France (Annecy)		LREM	LREM
Haute-Savoie	3rd	Martial Saddier	15 October 1969	France (Bonneville)		LR	LR
Haute-Savoie	4th	Virginie Duby-Muller	16 August 1979	France (Bonneville)		LR	LR
Haute-Savoie	5th	Marion Lenne	20 November 1974	France (Gardanne)		LREM	LREM
Haute-Savoie	6th	Xavier Roseren	12 January 1970	France (Chamonix)		LREM	LREM
Paris	1st	Sylvain Maillard	28 April 1974	France (Saint-Maur-des-Fossés)		LREM	LREM
Paris	2nd	Gilles Le Gendre	13 May 1958	France (Neuilly-sur-Seine)		LREM	LREM
Paris	3rd	Stanislas Guerini	14 May 1982	France (Paris 15^{e})		LREM	LREM
Paris	4th	Brigitte Kuster	12 April 1959	France (Saint-Cloud)		LR	LR
Paris	5th	Benjamin Griveaux	29 December 1977	France (Saint-Rémy)		LREM	LREM
Paris	6th	Pierre Person	22 January 1989	France (Nancy)		LREM	LREM
Paris	7th	Pacôme Rupin	25 January 1985	France (Chambray-lès-Tours)		LREM	LREM
Paris	8th	Laetitia Avia	29 October 1985	France (Livry-Gargan)		LREM	LREM
Paris	9th	Buon Tan	10 March 1967	Cambodia (Phnom Penh)		LREM	LREM
Paris	10th	Anne-Christine Lang	10 August 1961	France (Mont-de-Marsan)		LREM	LREM
Paris	11th	Marielle de Sarnez	27 March 1951	France (Paris 8^{e})		MoDem	MoDem
Paris	12th	Olivia Grégoire	30 September 1978	France (Paris)		LREM	LREM
Paris	13th	Hugues Renson	11 February 1978	France (Paris 15^{e})		LREM	LREM
Paris	14th	Claude Goasguen	12 March 1945	France (Toulon)		LR	LR
Paris	15th	George Pau-Langevin	19 October 1948	France (Pointe-à-Pitre)		PS	NG
Paris	16th	Delphine O	25 December 1985	France (Mont-Saint-Aignan)		LREM	LREM
Paris	17th	Danièle Obono	12 July 1980	Gabon (Libreville)		FI	FI
Paris	18th	Pierre-Yves Bournazel	31 August 1977	France (Riom-ès-Montagnes)		LR–Agir	UAI
Seine-Maritime	1st	Damien Adam	28 June 1989	France (Orléans)		LREM	LREM
Seine-Maritime	2nd	Annie Vidal	17 September 1956	France (La Bohalle)		LREM	LREM
Seine-Maritime	3rd	Hubert Wulfranc	17 December 1956	France (Rouen)		PCF	GDR
Seine-Maritime	4th	Sira Sylla	14 March 1980	France (Rouen)		LREM	LREM
Seine-Maritime	5th	Christophe Bouillon	4 March 1969	France (Rouen)		PS	NG
Seine-Maritime	6th	Sébastien Jumel	20 December 1971	France (Sainte-Adresse)		PCF	GDR
Seine-Maritime	7th	Agnès Firmin-Le Bodo	20 November 1968	France (Le Havre)		LR–Agir	UAI
Seine-Maritime	8th	Jean-Paul Lecoq	13 October 1958	France (Le Havre)		PCF	GDR
Seine-Maritime	9th	Stéphanie Kerbarh	31 July 1975	France (Orléans)		LREM	LREM
Seine-Maritime	10th	Xavier Batut	26 December 1976	France (Créteil)		LREM	LREM
Seine-et-Marne	1st	Aude Luquet	18 August 1967	France (Melun)		MoDem	MoDem
Seine-et-Marne	2nd	Valérie Lacroute	29 October 1965	France (Chalon-sur-Saône)		LR	LR
Seine-et-Marne	3rd	Jean-Louis Thiériot	26 June 1969	France (Paris)		LR	LR
Seine-et-Marne	4th	Christian Jacob	4 December 1959	France (Rozay-en-Brie)		LR	LR
Seine-et-Marne	5th	Franck Riester	3 January 1974	France (Paris (15°))		Agir	UAI
Seine-et-Marne	6th	Jean-François Parigi	25 January 1960	France (Châtenay-Malabry)		LR	LR
Seine-et-Marne	7th	Rodrigue Kokouendo	8 March 1974	Central African Republic (Bangui)		LREM	LREM
Seine-et-Marne	8th	Jean-Michel Fauvergue	31 January 1957	France (Bages)		LREM	LREM
Seine-et-Marne	9th	Michèle Peyron	22 July 1961	France (Nîmes)		LREM	LREM
Seine-et-Marne	10th	Stéphanie Do	20 December 1979	Vietnam (Ho Chi Minh City)		LREM	LREM
Seine-et-Marne	11th	Olivier Faure	18 August 1968	France (La Tronche)		PS	NG
Yvelines	1st	Didier Baichère	20 August 1970	France (Limoux)		LREM	LREM
Yvelines	2nd	Jean-Noël Barrot	13 May 1983	France (Paris)		MoDem	MoDem
Yvelines	3rd	Béatrice Piron	30 August 1965	France (Martigues)		LREM	LREM
Yvelines	4th	Marie Lebec	17 December 1990	France (Vernon)		LREM	LREM
Yvelines	5th	Yaël Braun-Pivet	7 December 1970	France (Nancy)		LREM	LREM
Yvelines	6th	Natalia Pouzyreff	18 February 1961	France (Limoges)		LREM	LREM
Yvelines	7th	Michèle de Vaucouleurs	12 February 1964	France (Albertville)		MoDem	MoDem
Yvelines	8th	Michel Vialay	6 January 1960	France (Paris (20°))		LR	LR
Yvelines	9th	Bruno Millienne	28 November 1959	France (Argenteuil)		MoDem	MoDem
Yvelines	10th	Aurore Bergé	13 November 1986	France (Paris)		LREM	LREM
Yvelines	11th	Philippe Benassaya	4 August 1964	France (Pantin)		UDI	UAI
Yvelines	12th	Florence Granjus	17 May 1962	France (Nanterre)		LREM	LREM
Deux-Sèvres	1st	Guillaume Chiche	30 March 1986	France (Niort)		EDS	EDS
Deux-Sèvres	2nd	Delphine Batho	23 March 1973	France (Paris (12°))		GE	EDS
Deux-Sèvres	3rd	Jean-Marie Fiévet	19 June 1964	France (Bressuire)		LREM	LREM
Somme	1st	François Ruffin	18 October 1975	France (Calais)		Picardie Debout	FI
Somme	2nd	Barbara Pompili	13 June 1975	France (Bois-Bernard)		PE	LREM
Somme	3rd	Emmanuel Maquet	2 June 1968	France (Dieppe)		LR	LR
Somme	4th	Jean-Claude Leclabart	4 December 1954	France (Lawarde-Mauger-l'Hortoy)		LREM	LREM
Somme	5th	Stéphane Demilly	26 June 1963	France (Albert)		UDI	UAI
Tarn	1st	Philippe Folliot	14 July 1963	France (Albi)		AC	LREM
Tarn	2nd	Marie-Christine Verdier-Jouclas	19 March 1965	France (Albi)		LREM	LREM
Tarn	3rd	Jean Terlier	2 March 1977	France (Toulon)		LREM	LREM
Tarn-et-Garonne	1st	Valérie Rabault	25 April 1973	France (L'Haÿ-les-Roses)		PS	NG
Tarn-et-Garonne	2nd	Sylvia Pinel	28 September 1977	France (L'Union)		MR	LT
Var	1st	Geneviève Levy	24 February 1948	France (Marseille)		LR	LR
Var	2nd	Cécile Muschotti	30 October 1987	France (Toulon)		LREM	LREM
Var	3rd	Jean-Louis Masson	5 February 1954	France (La Garde)		LR	LR
Var	4th	Sereine Mauborgne	3 May 1972	France (Le Mans)		LREM	LREM
Var	5th	Philippe Michel-Kleisbauer	6 March 1969	France (Draguignan)		MoDem	MoDem
Var	6th	Valérie Gomez-Bassac	16 July 1969	France (Valenciennes)		LREM	LREM
Var	7th	Émilie Guerel	18 December 1983	France (Carpentras)		LREM	LREM
Var	8th	Fabien Matras	12 September 1984	France (Grenoble)		LREM	LREM
Vaucluse	1st	Souad Zitouni	23 April 1974	Algeria (Boukadir)		LREM	LREM
Vaucluse	2nd	Jean-Claude Bouchet	2 May 1957	France (Cavaillon)		LR	LR
Vaucluse	3rd	Adrien Morenas	1 January 1982	France (Carpentras)		LREM	LREM
Vaucluse	4th	Marie-France Lorho	15 December 1964	France (Colmar)		LS	NI
Vaucluse	5th	Julien Aubert	11 June 1978	France (Marseille)		LR	LR
Vendée	1st	Philippe Latombe	21 April 1975	France (Paris 14^{e})		MoDem	MoDem
Vendée	2nd	Patricia Gallerneau	9 September 1954	France (Paris 20^{e})		MoDem	MoDem
Vendée	3rd	Stéphane Buchou	14 March 1974	France (Strasbourg)		LREM	LREM
Vendée	4th	Martine Leguille-Balloy	6 September 1957	France (La Guerche-sur-l'Aubois)		LREM	LREM
Vendée	5th	Pierre Henriet	26 November 1991	France (Fontenay-le-Comte)		LREM	LREM
Vienne	1st	Jacques Savatier	23 October 1952	France (Fontenay-le-Comte)		LREM	LREM
Vienne	2nd	Sacha Houlié	8 October 1988	France (Bressuire)		LREM	LREM
Vienne	3rd	Jean-Michel Clément	31 October 1954	France (Mauprévoir)		PP	LT
Vienne	4th	Nicolas Turquois	26 July 1972	France (Tours)		MoDem	MoDem
Haute-Vienne	1st	Sophie Beaudouin-Hubière	20 November 1972	France (Toulouse)		LREM	LREM
Haute-Vienne	2nd	Pierre Venteau	26 August 1974	France (Saint-Yrieix-la-Perche)		LREM	LREM
Haute-Vienne	3rd	Marie-Ange Magne	20 November 1987	France (Limoges)		LREM	LREM
Vosges	1st	Stéphane Viry	14 October 1969	France (Épinal)		LR	LR
Vosges	2nd	Gérard Cherpion	15 March 1948	France (Dombasle-sur-Meurthe)		LR	LR
Vosges	3rd	Christophe Naegelen	30 December 1983	France (Remiremont)		DVD	UAI
Vosges	4th	Jean-Jacques Gaultier	13 July 1963	France (Épinal)		LR	LR
Yonne	1st	Guillaume Larrivé	24 January 1977	France (Mulhouse)		LR	LR
Yonne	2nd	André Villiers	13 December 1954	France (Avallon)		UDI	UDI+
Yonne	3rd	Michèle Crouzet	31 August 1967	France (Lormes)		MoDem	MoDem+
Territoire de Belfort	1st	Ian Boucard (Note: Boucard's election was annulled by the Constitutional Council on 8 December 2017. He was re-elected in the subsequent by-election)	5 May 1988	France (Belfort)		LR	LR
Territoire de Belfort	2nd	Michel Zumkeller	21 January 1966	France (Belfort)		PR	UDI+
Essonne	1st	Francis Chouat	20 December 1948	France (Argenteuil)		LREM	LREM
Essonne	2nd	Franck Marlin	30 September 1964	France (Orléans)		LR	LR
Essonne	3rd	Laëtitia Romeiro Dias	15 January 1981	France (Paris 13^{e})		LREM	LREM
Essonne	4th	Marie-Pierre Rixain	18 January 1977	France (Saint-Cyr-l'École)		LREM	LREM
Essonne	5th	Cédric Villani	5 October 1973	France (Brive-la-Gaillarde)		EDS	EDS
Essonne	6th	Amélie de Montchalin	19 June 1985	France (Lyon 8^{e})		LREM	LREM
Essonne	7th	Robin Reda	10 May 1991	France (Savigny-sur-Orge)		LR	LR
Essonne	8th	Nicolas Dupont-Aignan	7 March 1961	France (Paris 15^{e})		DLF	NI
Essonne	9th	Marie Guévenoux	2 November 1976	France (Amiens)		LREM	LREM
Essonne	10th	Pierre-Alain Raphan	6 April 1983	France (Choisy-le-Roi)		LREM	LREM
Hauts-de-Seine	1st	Elsa Faucillon	6 August 1981	France (Amiens)		PCF	GDR
Hauts-de-Seine	2nd	Bénédicte Pételle	4 June 1971	France (Bourg-en-Bresse)		LREM	LREM
Hauts-de-Seine	3rd	Christine Hennion	23 August 1955	France (Roubaix)		LREM	LREM
Hauts-de-Seine	4th	Isabelle Florennes	2 August 1967	France (Arras)		MoDem	MoDem+
Hauts-de-Seine	5th	Céline Calvez	24 July 1979	France (Rennes)		LREM	LREM
Hauts-de-Seine	6th	Constance Le Grip	14 November 1960	France (Chatou)		LR	LR
Hauts-de-Seine	7th	Jacques Marilossian	26 July 1958	France (Le Puy-en-Velay)		LREM	LREM
Hauts-de-Seine	8th	Jacques Maire	4 April 1962	France (Enghien-les-Bains)		LREM	LREM
Hauts-de-Seine	9th	Thierry Solère	17 August 1971	France (Nantes)		LR	LREM
Hauts-de-Seine	10th	Florence Provendier	28 October 1965	France (Saint-Denis)		LREM	LREM
Hauts-de-Seine	11th	Laurianne Rossi	18 May 1984	France (Toulon)		LREM	LREM
Hauts-de-Seine	12th	Jean-Louis Bourlanges	13 July 1946	France (Neuilly-sur-Seine)		MoDem	MoDem+
Hauts-de-Seine	13th	Frédérique Dumas	18 May 1963	France (Paris (20°))		EELV	LT
Seine-Saint-Denis	1st	Éric Coquerel	30 December 1958	France (Courbevoie)		FI	FI
Seine-Saint-Denis	2nd	Stéphane Peu	24 July 1962	France (Pau)		PCF	GDR
Seine-Saint-Denis	3rd	Patrice Anato	14 March 1976	Togo (Lomé)		LREM	LREM
Seine-Saint-Denis	4th	Marie-George Buffet	7 May 1949	France (Sceaux)		PCF	GDR
Seine-Saint-Denis	5th	Jean-Christophe Lagarde	24 October 1967	France (Châtellerault)		UDI	UDI+
Seine-Saint-Denis	6th	Bastien Lachaud	5 August 1980	France (Vitry-sur-Seine)		FI	FI
Seine-Saint-Denis	7th	Alexis Corbière	17 August 1968	France (Béziers)		FI	FI
Seine-Saint-Denis	8th	Sylvie Charrière	15 May 1961	France (Montreuil)		LREM	LREM
Seine-Saint-Denis	9th	Sabine Rubin	13 August 1960	France (Paris)		FI	FI
Seine-Saint-Denis	10th	Alain Ramadier	8 July 1958	France (Paris)		LR	LR
Seine-Saint-Denis	11th	Clémentine Autain	26 May 1973	France (Saint-Cloud)		Ensemble!	FI
Seine-Saint-Denis	12th	Stéphane Testé	10 May 1968	France (Aulnay-sous-Bois)		LREM	LREM
Val-de-Marne	1st	Frédéric Descrozaille	16 April 1967	France (Neuilly-sur-Seine)		LREM	LREM
Val-de-Marne	2nd	Jean François Mbaye	1 January 1979	Senegal (Dakar)		LREM	LREM
Val-de-Marne	3rd	Laurent Saint-Martin	22 June 1985	France (Toulouse)		LREM	LREM
Val-de-Marne	4th	Maud Petit	15 November 1971	France (Paris)		MoDem	MoDem+
Val-de-Marne	5th	Gilles Carrez	29 August 1948	France (Paris)		LR	LR
Val-de-Marne	6th	Guillaume Gouffier-Cha	1 February 1986	France (Beauvais)		LREM	LREM
Val-de-Marne	7th	Jean-Jacques Bridey	7 May 1953	France (Nice)		LREM	LREM
Val-de-Marne	8th	Michel Herbillon	6 March 1951	France (Saint-Mandé)		LR	LR
Val-de-Marne	9th	Isabelle Santiago	20 September 1965	France (Neuilly-sur-Seine)		PS	Soc+
Val-de-Marne	10th	Mathilde Panot	15 January 1989	France (Tours)		FI	FI
Val-de-Marne	11th	Albane Gaillot	7 July 1971	France (Paris 13^{e})		EELV	NI
Val-d'Oise	1st	Antoine Savignat	22 July 1975	France (Cormeilles-en-Parisis)		LR	LR
Val-d'Oise	2nd	Guillaume Vuilletet	20 June 1967	France (Beauvais)		LREM	LREM
Val-d'Oise	3rd	Cécile Rilhac	21 April 1974	France (Paris 15^{e})		LREM	LREM
Val-d'Oise	4th	Naïma Moutchou	4 November 1980	France (Ermont)		LREM	LREM
Val-d'Oise	5th	Fiona Lazaar	19 September 1985	France (Argenteuil)		LREM	LREM app.
Val-d'Oise	6th	Nathalie Élimas	5 June 1973	France (Beauvais)		MoDem	MoDem+
Val-d'Oise	7th	Dominique Da Silva	30 June 1968	France (L'Isle-Adam)		LREM	LREM
Val-d'Oise	8th	François Pupponi	31 July 1962	France (Nantua)		MoDem	MoDem+
Val-d'Oise	9th	Zivka Park	22 January 1985	France (Aubervilliers)		LREM	LREM
Val-d'Oise	10th	Aurélien Taché	26 May 1984	France (Niort)		EELV	NI
Guadeloupe	1st	Olivier Serva	21 June 1974	France (Pointe-à-Pitre)		LREM	LREM
Guadeloupe	2nd	Justine Benin	12 March 1975	France (Les Abymes)		MoDem	MoDem+ app.
Guadeloupe	3rd	Max Mathiasin	24 February 1956	France (Deshaies)		MoDem	MoDem+ app.
Guadeloupe	4th	Hélène Vainqueur-Christophe	6 May 1956	France (Trois-Rivières)		PPM	Soc+
Martinique	1st	Josette Manin	16 March 1950	France (Le Lamentin)		PPM	Soc+ app.
Martinique	2nd	Manuéla Kéclard-Mondésir	6 May 1971	France (Le Lamentin)		PCF	GDR
Martinique	3rd	Vacant					
Martinique	4th	Jean-Philippe Nilor	15 May 1965	France (Fort-de-France)		PCF	GDR
French Guiana	1st	Vacant					
French Guiana	2nd	Lénaïck Adam (Note: Adam's election was annulled by the Constitutional Council on 8 December 2017. He was re-elected in the subsequent by-election)	19 February 1992	France (Saint-Laurent-du-Maroni)		LREM	LREM
Réunion	1st	Philippe Naillet	14 August 1960	France (Saint-Denis)		PS	Soc+
Réunion	2nd	Karine Lebon	9 June 1985	France (Le Port)		PCR	GDR
Réunion	3rd	Nathalie Bassire	22 January 1968	France (Saint-Pierre)		DVD	LR app.
Réunion	4th	David Lorion	15 October 1964	France (Saint-Pierre)		LR	LR
Réunion	5th	Jean-Hugues Ratenon	25 June 1967	France (Saint-Benoît)		FI	FI
Réunion	6th	Nadia Ramassamy	17 May 1961	France (Saint-Denis)		LR	LR app.
Réunion	7th	Jean-Luc Poudroux				LR	LR app.
Mayotte	1st	Ramlati Ali (Note: Ali's election was annulled by the Constitutional Council on 19 January 2018. She was re-elected in the subsequent by-election)	28 May 1961	France (Pamandzi)		LREM	LREM
Mayotte	2nd	Mansour Kamardine	23 March 1959	France (Sada)		LR	LR
New Caledonia	1st	Philippe Dunoyer	11 January 1968	France (Nouméa)		CE	UDI+
New Caledonia	2nd	Philippe Gomès	27 October 1958	Algeria (Algiers)		CE	UDI+
French Polynesia	1st	Maina Sage	10 May 1975	France (Papeete)		TH	AE
French Polynesia	2nd	Nicole Sanquer	16 June 1972	France (Papeete)		DVD	UDI+
French Polynesia	3rd	Moetai Brotherson	22 October 1969	France (Papeete)		Tavini	GDR
Saint-Pierre-et-Miquelon	1st	Stéphane Claireaux	23 June 1964	France (Saint-Pierre)		CapA	LREM
Wallis and Futuna	1st	Sylvain Brial	16 September 1964	France (Futuna)		DVD	LT
Saint-Martin/Saint-Barthélemy	1st	Claire Guion-Firmin	6 September 1957	France (Saint-Martin)		LR	LR app.
French residents overseas	1st	Roland Lescure	26 November 1966	France (Paris 11^{e})		LREM	LREM
French residents overseas	2nd	Paula Forteza	8 August 1986	France (Paris)		EELV	NI
French residents overseas	3rd	Alexandre Holroyd	17 May 1987	Switzerland (Basel)		LREM	LREM
French residents overseas	4th	Pieyre-Alexandre Anglade	2 November 1986	France (Paris 16^{e})		LREM	LREM
French residents overseas	5th	Stephane Vojetta	19 July 1974	France (Nancy)		LREM	LREM
French residents overseas	6th	Joachim Son-Forget	15 April 1983	South Korea (Seoul)		NI	NI
French residents overseas	7th	Frédéric Petit	10 February 1961	France (Marseille)		MoDem	MoDem+
French residents overseas	8th	Meyer Habib	28 April 1961	France (Paris 12^{e})		DVD	UDI+
French residents overseas	9th	M'jid El Guerrab	25 April 1983	France (Aurillac)		DVD	AE
French residents overseas	10th	Amal Amélia Lakrafi	20 March 1978	Morocco (Casablanca)		LREM	LREM
French residents overseas	11th	Anne Genetet	20 April 1963	France (Neuilly-sur-Seine)		LREM	LREM

== Former deputies ==
Constituency		Deputy	Date of birth	Place of birth	Portrait	Party	Group	Mandate end	Reason	Successor
Eure	1st	Bruno Le Maire	15 April 1969	France (Neuilly-sur-Seine)		LREM	LREM	21 July 2017	Appointed to government	Séverine Gipson
Landes	1st	Geneviève Darrieussecq	4 March 1956	France (Dax)		MoDem	MoDem	21 July 2017	Appointed to government	Fabien Lainé
Vaucluse	3rd	Brune Poirson	1 September 1982	United States (Washington, D.C.)		LREM	LREM	21 July 2017	Appointed to government	Adrien Morenas
Saint-Pierre-et-Miquelon	1st	Annick Girardin	3 August 1964	France (Saint-Malo)		PRG	LREM app.	21 July 2017	Appointed to government	Stéphane Claireaux
Vaucluse	4th	Jacques Bompard	24 February 1943	France (Montpellier)		LS	NI	21 August 2017	Cumulation of mandates as mayor of Orange	Marie-France Lorho
Val-d'Oise	1st	Isabelle Muller-Quoy	8 November 1967	France (Agen)		LREM	LREM	16 November 2017	Election annulled by the Constitutional Council	Antoine Savignat
Ardèche	2nd	Olivier Dussopt	16 August 1978	France (Annonay)		PS	NG	24 December 2017	Appointed to government	Michèle Victory
Wallis and Futuna	1st	Napole Polutele	25 June 1964	France (Mu'a)		DVG	UAI app.	2 February 2018	Election annulled by the Constitutional Council	Sylvain Brial
Martinique	2nd	Bruno Nestor Azerot	22 July 1961	France (La Trinité)		DVG	GDR	23 April 2018	Cumulation of mandates as mayor of Sainte-Marie	Manuéla Mondésir-Kéclard
Réunion	7th	Thierry Robert	1 April 1977	France (Saint-Denis)		MoDem	MoDem	6 July 2018	Declared ineligible by the Constitutional Council	Jean-Luc Poudroux
Sarthe	4th	Stéphane Le Foll	3 February 1960	France (Le Mans)		PS	NG	11 July 2018	Cumulation of mandates as mayor of Le Mans	Sylvie Tolmont
Seine-et-Marne	3rd	Yves Jégo	17 April 1961	France (Besançon)		UDI	UAI	15 July 2018	Resignation	Jean-Louis Thiériot
Essonne	1st	Manuel Valls	13 August 1962	Spain (Barcelona)		DVG	LREM app.	3 October 2018	Resignation	Francis Chouat
Manche	3rd	Grégory Galbadon	21 January 1973	France (Coutances)		LREM	LREM	16 November 2018	Resumption of the mandate by a former member of the Government	Stéphane Travert
Hauts-de-Seine	10th	Gabriel Attal	16 March 1989	France (Clamart)		LREM	LREM	16 November 2018	Appointed to government	Florence Provendier
Gironde	12th	Christelle Dubos	26 March 1976	France (Le Coteau)		LREM	LREM	16 November 2018	Appointed to government	Pascal Lavergne
Loir-et-Cher	1st	Marc Fesneau	11 January 1971	France (Paris)		MoDem	MoDem	16 November 2018	Appointed to government	Stéphane Baudu
Seine-et-Marne	5th	Franck Riester	3 January 1974	France (Paris)		Agir	UAI	16 November 2018	Appointed to government	Patricia Lemoine
Loir-et-Cher	3rd	Maurice Leroy	2 February 1956	France (Paris)		UDI	UAI	9 January 2019	Cumulation of mandates as Vice-President of Loir-et-Cher's Departmental council	Pascal Brindeau
Hauts-de-Seine	2nd	Adrien Taquet	3 January 1977	France (Paris 16^{e})		LREM	LREM	25 February 2019	Appointed to government	Bénédicte Pételle
Paris	5th	Élise Fajgeles	6 July 1970	France (Sartrouville)		LREM	LREM	27 April 2019	Resumption of the mandate by a former member of the Government	Benjamin Griveaux
Paris	16th	Delphine O	25 December 1985	France (Mont-Saint-Aignan)		LREM	LREM	27 April 2019	Resumption of the mandate by a former member of the Government	Mounir Mahjoubi
Essonne	6th	Amélie de Montchalin	19 June 1985	France (Lyon 8^{e})		LREM	LREM	30 April 2019	Appointed to government	Stéphanie Atger
Vendée	2nd	Patricia Gallerneau	9 September 1954	France (Paris 20^{e})		MoDem	MoDem	7 July 2019	Death	Patrick Loiseau
Loire-Atlantique	1st	Mounir Belhamiti	8 March 1985	France (Nantes)		PÉ	LREM	16 August 2019	Resumption of the mandate by a former member of the Government	François de Rugy
Haute-Vienne	2nd	Jean-Baptiste Djebbari	26 February 1982	France (Melun)		LREM	LREM	3 October 2019	Appointed to government	Pierre Venteau
Nord	11th	Laurent Pietraszewski	16 November 1966	France (Saint-Denis)		LREM	LREM	17 January 2020	Appointed to government	Florence Morlighem
Gard	2nd	Gilbert Collard	3 February 1948	France (Marseille)		RN	NI	31 January 2020	Cumulation of mandates as Member of the European Parliament	Nicolas Meizonnet
Ille-et-Vilaine	3rd	François André	11 July 1967	France (Rennes)		DVG	LREM	11 February 2020	Death	Claudia Rouaux
Isère	1st	Olivier Véran	22 April 1980	France (Saint-Martin-d'Hères)		LREM	LREM	16 March 2020	Appointed to government	Camille Galliard-Minier
Vaucluse	1st	Jean-François Cesarini	30 September 1970	France (Avignon)		LREM	LREM	29 March 2020	Death	Souad Zitouni
Paris	14th	Claude Goasguen	12 March 1945	France (Toulon)		LR	LR	28 May 2020	Death	Sandra Boëlle
Rhône	8th	Patrice Verchère	29 December 1973	France (Pont-Trambouze)		LR	LR	17 June 2020	Cumulation of mandates as mayor of Cours	Nathalie Serre
Seine-Maritime	5th	Christophe Bouillon	4 March 1969	France (Rouen)		PS	NG	17 June 2020	Cumulation of mandates as mayor of Barentin	Gérard Leseul
Seine-et-Marne	2nd	Valérie Lacroute	29 October 1965	France (Chalon-sur-Saône)		LR	LR	22 June 2020	Cumulation of mandates as mayor of Nemours	Sylvie Bouchet Bellecourt
Nord	7th	Francis Vercamer	10 May 1958	France (Lille)		LC	UDI	22 June 2020	Cumulation of mandates as mayor of Hem	Valérie Six
Val-de-Marne	9th	Luc Carvounas	8 June 1971	France (Charenton-le-Pont)		PS	NG	23 June 2020	Cumulation of mandates as mayor of Alfortville	Isabelle Santiago
Bas-Rhin	6th	Laurent Furst	19 May 1965	France (Colmar)		LR	LR	27 June 2020	Cumulation of mandates as mayor of Molsheim	Philippe Meyer
Orne	1st	Joaquim Pueyo	30 May 1950	France (Alençon)		PS	NG	2 August 2020	Cumulation of mandates as mayor of Alençon	Chantal Jourdan
Réunion	1st	Ericka Bareigts	16 April 1967	France (Saint-Denis)		PS	NG	4 July 2020	Cumulation of mandates as mayor of Saint-Denis	Philippe Naillet
Yvelines	11th	Nadia Hai	8 March 1980	France (Trappes)		LREM	LREM	6 July 2020	Appointed to government	Philippe Benassaya
Réunion	2nd	Huguette Bello	24 August 1950	France (Saint-Pierre)		PCR	GDR	7 July 2020	Cumulation of mandates as mayor of Saint-Paul	Karine Lebon
Alpes-de-Haute-Provence	2nd	Emmanuelle Fontaine-Domeizel	28 August 1973	France (Manosque)		LREM	LREM	August 2020	Resumption of mandate by a former member of the government	Christophe Castaner
Essonne	2nd	Franck Marlin	30 September 1964	France (Orléans)		LR	LR	4 August 2020	Cumulation of mandates	Bernard Bouley
Pas-de-Calais	4th	Daniel Fasquelle	16 January 1963	France (Saint-Omer)		LR	LR	4 August 2020	Cumulation of mandates	Robert Therry
Somme	2nd	Barbara Pompili	13 June 1975	France (Bois-Bernard)		LREM	LREM	7 August 2020	Appointed to government	Cécile Delpirou
Hautes-Alpes	2nd	Joël Giraud	14 October 1959	France (Gap)		PRG	LREM	26 August 2020	Appointed to government	Claire Bouchet
Loire-Atlantique	5th	Sarah El Haïry	16 March 1989	France (Romorantin-Lanthenay)		MoDem	MoDem	26 August 2020	Appointed to government	Luc Geismar
Paris	12th	Olivia Grégoire	30 September 1978	France (Paris)		LREM	LREM	26 August 2020	Appointed to government	Marie Silin
Haute-Marne	1st	Bérangère Abba	22 October 1976	France (Chaumont, Haute-Marne)		LR	LR	27 August 2020	Appointed to government	Sylvain Templier
Haut-Rhin	1st	Éric Straumann	17 August 1964	France (Colmar)		LR	LR	29 July 2020	Cumulation of mandates as mayor of Colmar	Yves Hemedinger
Indre-et-Loire	3rd	Sophie Auconie	19 August 1963	France (Dugny)		UDI	UDI	5 March 2021	Resignation	Sophie Métadier
Oise	1st	Olivier Dassault	1 June 1951	France (Boulogne-Billancourt)		LR	LR	7 March 2021	Death	Victor Habert-Dassault
Vaucluse	3rd	Brune Poirson	1 September 1982	United States (Washington, D.C.)		LREM	LREM	5 April 2021	Return to the private sector Extension of a government mission	Adrien Morenas
Pas-de-Calais	10th	Ludovic Pajot	18 November 1993	France (Beuvry)		FN	NI	22 April 2021	Cumulation of mandates as mayor of Bruay-la-Buissière	Myriane Houplain
Aveyron	3rd	Arnaud Viala	4 December 1974	France (Millau)		LR	LR	31 July 2021	Cumulation of mandates as president of the Departmental Council of Aveyron.	Sébastien David
French Guiana	1st	Gabriel Serville	27 September 1959	France (Cayenne)		PSG	GDR	1 August 2021	Cumulation of mandates as president of the Assembly of French Guiana	Vacant
Martinique	3rd	Serge Letchimy	13 January 1953	France (Gros-Morne)		PPM	NG app.	? 2021	Cumulation of mandates ?	Vacant
Haute-Savoie	3rd	Martial Saddier	15 October 1969	France (Bonneville)		LR	LR	2 August 2021	Cumulation of mandates as president of the Departmental Council of Haute-Savoie.	Christelle Petex-Levet
French residents overseas	5th	Samantha Cazebonne	10 August 1971	France (La Rochelle)		LREM	LREM	1 October 2021	Cumulation of mandates as elected Senator	Stephane Vojetta
Haute-Savoie	2nd	Frédérique Lardet	1 September 1966	France (Annecy)		LREM	LREM	29 January 2022	Cumulation of mandates as Mayor of Grand Annecy	Jacques Rey
