= Agir Ensemble group =

French parliamentary group

The Agir Ensemble group ("Act Together") was a parliamentary group of the French National Assembly in the 15th legislature of the Fifth Republic from 2020 to 2022.

It was made up of deputies from Agir and the UDI and Independents group. The group was formed on 26 May 2020, with nine members of the Agir party, six members of La République En Marche! and one member of the Liberties and Territories group.

The group was chaired by Olivier Becht. Agnès Firmin-Le Bodo and Jean-Charles Larsonneur acted as vice presidents of the group, while Pierre-Yves Bournazel, Valérie Petit and Vincent Ledoux were the group's spokespeople.

== History ==
The Agir Ensemble group was created less than a week after the creation of another parliamentary group, Ecology Democracy Solidarity (EDS). Agir Ensemble became the tenth parliamentary group in the National Assembly, then a record high number under the Fifth Republic.

The group came to political effect on 20 April 2020, when there was a vote concerning the ending of the COVID-19 lockdown: Agir Ensemble members voted in favour of the motion, whilst others parliamentarians abstained or voted against the motion.
