= 15th legislature of the French Fifth Republic =

2017–2022 sitting of the French Parliament

15th legislature of the French Fifth Republic XV^{e} législature de la Cinquième République française

History
- Founded: 21 June 2017
- Disbanded: 21 June 2022
- Preceded by: 14th legislature
- Succeeded by: 16th legislature

Leadership
- President of the National Assembly: Richard Ferrand, LREM since 12 September 2018
- President of the Senate: Gérard Larcher, LR since 1 October 2014
- Government: Philippe II, LREM–MoDem
- Castex, LREM–MoDem-Agir-TDP-MRSL
- Borne, Ensemble

Structure
- Seats: 577 deputies
- Political groups: Government (344): LREM (266) (Note: LaREM (178); TdP (50); EC (10); PRV (7); Horizons (5); DVC (5); AC (4); PÉ (2); GUSR (1); DVD (1); DVG (1); Cap sur l'avenir (1)); MDDA (56) (Note: MoDem (50); LaREM (4); DVG (2)); AE (22) (Note: Agir (8); Horizons (8); PRV (2); DVD (2); LaREM (1); Tapura (1)); Opposition (222): LR (101) (Note: LR (91); DVD (8); LR-SL (2)); SOC (28) (Note: PS (24); MDC (2); G.s (1); BPM (1)); UDI (19) (Note: UDI (12); Horizons (2); CE (2); FED (1); DVD (1); A here ia (1)); LT (17) (Note: PRG (3); DVG (3); DVD (2); FeC (2); PRV (2); MdP (1); PNC (1); Résistons! (1); LÉF (1); LC (1); PP (1)); LFI (17) (Note: LFI (17); PG (7); Ensemble! (3); PD! (1); RÉ 974 (1)); GDR (15) (Note: PCF (11); DVG (1); PLR (1); Péyi-A (1); Tavini (1)); NI (25) (Note: RN (6); ND (3); REC (1); DLF (1); LS (1); EXD (1); JSFee (1); GE (1); Tapura (1); Independent (9)); Vacant (11): Vacant (11)

Elections
- Voting system: Two-round system
- Last election: 11 and 18 June 2017

The 15th legislature of the French Fifth Republic (French: XV^{e} législature de la Cinquième République française) was the French Parliament that was in office from 27 June 2017 (following the legislative elections on 11 and 18 June 2017) until 21 June 2022. The party of President Emmanuel Macron, La République En Marche! (LREM), obtained an absolute majority of 308 deputies, alongside its ally, the Democratic Movement (MoDem), which secured 42 seats. The newly installed deputies elected François de Rugy as President of the National Assembly when the National Assembly first convened on 27 June. The legislative election saw a record level of renewal, with only a quarter of the deputies elected in 2012 also elected in 2017, as well as a significant increase in the representation of women and youth. With seven planned parliamentary groups, it would be the most fragmented National Assembly since 1958.

It was preceded by the 14th legislature and succeeded by the 16th legislature.

== Composition of the executive ==
- President of the French Republic: Emmanuel Macron (LREM), since 14 May 2017
- Prime Minister: Jean Castex (LREM), since 3 July 2020

== Composition of the National Assembly ==
Proportion of women elected to the National Assembly
2017 elections	38.8%
2012 elections	26.9%
2007 elections	18.5%
2002 elections	12.1%
1997 elections	10.8%
1993 elections	5.9%
1988 elections	5.6%

A record number and proportion of women were elected in the legislative elections, with 224 in total representing 38.8% of the National Assembly. This was an 11.9 percentage point increase over the previous legislature in which 155 women were elected deputies, representing 26.9% of the composition.

The average age of deputies in the 15th legislature was also significantly lower than that of the previous, at 48 years and 240 days compared to the previous legislature at 53 years and 195 days. The number of deputies under 30 years old soared from 4 to 29, while the number from 30 to 49 years old increased from 197 to 271, and the number of deputies between 60 and 69 years old was halved from 171 to 87.

Higher professions continued to remain dominant in the assembly despite these changes.

The legislative elections also saw a massive degree of renewal, with only a quarter of deputies elected in 2012 being re-elected in 2017; of the 354 outgoing deputies who stood for re-election, only 148 won. A total of 429 deputies elected to the 15th legislature were not elected in 2012. The renewal can be explained in part by the large number of outgoing deputies who did not seek to retain their seat: 223 deputies, representing 39% of the assembly. Of the 354 who did present themselves, 125 were eliminated in the first round on 11 June, 81 were defeated in the second round, and 148 were re-elected.

=== Changes in composition ===
Members of the National Assembly who join the government are required to give up their seats to their substitutes (suppléants) a month after their appointment, as stipulated in the constitution. Should ministers quit the government, they recover their seat in the National Assembly from their substitute a month after their resignation. By-elections are held in the event of the annulation of electoral results or vacancies caused by resignations (in most circumstances not those related to the death of a deputy, in which case the substitute takes the seat if possible), except within the year before legislative elections.

The appointment of the Philippe I government obligated several appointed ministers to give up their seats in the National Assembly to their substitutes: specifically, Minister of Economy and Finance Bruno Le Maire (Eure's 1st constituency) in favor of Séverine Gipson; Secretary of State for the Digital Sector Mounir Mahjoubi (Paris's 16th constituency) in favor of Delphine O; Minister for Europe and Foreign Affairs Marielle de Sarnez (Paris's 11th constituency) in favor of Maud Gatel; Minister of Territorial Cohesion Richard Ferrand (Finistère's 6th constituency) in favor of Lætitia Dolliou; Minister for Overseas France Annick Girardin (Saint-Pierre-et-Miquelon's 1st constituency) in favor of Stéphane Claireaux; and Secretary of State for Relations with Parliament and Government Spokesman Christophe Castaner (Alpes-de-Haute-Provence's 2nd constituency) in favor of Emmanuelle Fontaine-Domeizel. Following a reshuffle and the formation of the Philippe II government, Ferrand took his seat after his ephemeral ministerial tenure, as did de Sarnez after her departure from the government.

==== By-elections ====
Dates	Constituency	Incumbent deputy	Party	Group	Elected deputy	Party	Reason for by-election	Ref(s)
28 Jan and 4 Feb 2018	Val-d'Oise's 1st	Isabelle Muller-Quoy	LREM	LREM	Antoine Savignat	LR	Election invalidated by the Constitutional Council	
28 Jan and 4 Feb 2018	Territoire de Belfort's 1st	Ian Boucard	LR	LR	Ian Boucard	LR	Election invalidated by the Constitutional Council	
4 Mar and 11 Mar 2018	French Guiana's 2nd	Lénaïck Adam	LREM	LREM	Lénaïck Adam	LREM	Election invalidated by the Constitutional Council	
11 Mar and 18 Mar 2018	Haute-Garonne's 8th	Joël Aviragnet	PS	NG	Joël Aviragnet	PS	Election invalidated by the Constitutional Council	
18 Mar and 25 Mar 2018	Loiret's 4th	Jean-Pierre Door	LR	LR	Jean-Pierre Door	LR	Election invalidated by the Constitutional Council	
18 Mar and 25 Mar 2018	Mayotte's 1st	Ramlati Ali	PS	LREM	Ramlati Ali	LREM	Election invalidated by the Constitutional Council	
8 Apr and 22 Apr 2018	French residents overseas' 5th	Samantha Cazebonne	LREM	LREM	Samantha Cazebonne	LREM	Election invalidated by the Constitutional Council	
15 Apr and 22 Apr 2018	Wallis and Futuna's 1st	Napole Polutele	DVG	UAI app.	Sylvain Brial	SE	Election invalidated by the Constitutional Council	
23 Sep and 30 Sep 2018	Réunion's 7th	Thierry Robert	MoDem	MoDem	Jean-Luc Poudroux	DVD	Declared ineligible by the Constitutional Council	
18 Nov and 25 Nov 2018	Essonne's 1st	Manuel Valls	DVG	LREM	Francis Chouat	LREM	Resignation	

=== Election of the President of the National Assembly ===
The election of the President of the National Assembly occurred on 27 June at 15:00 CEST at the Palais Bourbon. The election, conducted by secret ballot, was presided over by the oldest member of the National Assembly (Bernard Brochant, LR), assisted by the six youngest deputies in the National Assembly, who serve as secretaries, namely, Ludovic Pajot, Typhanie Degois, Lénaïck Adam, Pierre Henriet, Robin Reda, and Bénédicte Peyrol. If, after two rounds, no candidate receives an absolute majority of votes, only a relative majority is required for election in the third ballot. Though the government indicated its preference for a politician from the right to take the position, a number of members of La République En Marche! voiced support for electing a president from among their ranks. Emmanuel Macron has also indicated a preference for a woman to become president of the assembly. Deputies named as ministers may not participate in the election of the president of the assembly, and their substitutes are only seated a month after the formation of the government (21 July).

Three deputies under the LREM label sought to seek the election as President of the National Assembly. After his re-election in Loire-Atlantique's 1st constituency on 18 June, the ecologist François de Rugy announced his intention to seek the presidency of the assembly, having made known his intentions to Macron. The candidacies of Sophie Errante and Brigitte Bourguignon were revealed discreetly on 23 June; both women served a single term after elected under the Socialist label in the 2012 legislative elections. LR deputy Jean-Charles Taugourdeau also presented himself as a candidate "for the form", according to the entourage of the Christian Jacob, the president of The Republicans group, in addition to Laure de la Raudière for the "constructives" group, Laurence Dumont for the "New Left" (former socialist) group, and Caroline Fiat for the FI group. The LREM candidate François de Rugy was designated by a vote of members; with 301 votes, a total of 153 votes were cast for de Rugy, 59 for Errante, 54 for Bourguignon, 32 for Philippe Folliot (whose candidacy was announced on 27 June by government spokesman Christophe Castaner), 2 blank votes, and 1 null vote. De Rugy was ultimately elected president of the assembly with 353 votes, against 94 for Taugourdeau, 34 for de La Raudière, 32 for Dumont, and 30 for Fiat, with 567 votes of which 543 were expressed.

Candidate	Constituency	Political group	Votes	%
François de Rugy	Loire-Atlantique's 1st	LREM	353	65.01
Jean-Charles Taugourdeau	Maine-et-Loire's 3rd	LR	94	17.31
Laure de La Raudière	Eure-et-Loir's 3rd	LC	34	6.26
Laurence Dumont	Calvados's 2nd	NG	32	5.89
Caroline Fiat	Meurthe-et-Moselle's 6th	FI	30	5.52
Votes			567	100.00
Blank and null votes			24	4.23
Expressed votes			543	95.77

Designation of the LREM candidate
Candidate	Constituency	Political group	Votes
François de Rugy	Loire-Atlantique's 1st	LREM	153
Sophie Errante	Loire-Atlantique's 10th	LREM	59
Brigitte Bourguignon	Pas-de-Calais's 6th	LREM	54
Philippe Folliot	Tarn's 1st	LREM	32
Votes			301
Blank votes			2
Null votes			1

=== Parliamentary groups ===
Parliamentary groups had until 26 June to elect their presidents, and on 27 June political groups were officially registered within the National Assembly through the rendering of a political declaration signed by each of its members. With 7 parliamentary groups, this National Assembly would be the most fragmented since 1958.

The Democratic Movement (MoDem) sought to form its own group in the National Assembly independent of that of La République En Marche!, with more than the 15 seats required to form a parliamentary group. The French Communist Party and la France Insoumise, which failed to secure an alliance during the preceding legislative elections, also chose to form independent groups in the National Assembly, with André Chassaigne of the PCF announcing the continuation of the previous group on 21 June, including 11 of its own deputies and 4 from overseas France, but without opposition to the FI group. Jean-Luc Mélenchon's demand to impose voting discipline and an obligation to respect the program of his movement prevented the creation of a common group.

In the aftermath of the legislative elections, the split between Macron-compatible "constructives" within the Republicans (LR) and the rest of the party re-emerged. On 21 June, Thierry Solère announced the creation of a new common group in the National Assembly with the Union of Democrats and Independents (UDI) likely to contain 18 UDI and about 15 LR deputies. The formation of two parliamentary groups on the right represented a symbolic divorce to the two threads on the right (the moderates and the hardliners) and the end of the old Union for a Popular Movement (UMP) which had been created in 2002 to unite the right and centre.

On 21 June, Christian Jacob was re-elected to lead the Republicans group with 62 votes against Damien Abad with 32 votes. Olivier Faure was re-elected as president of the New Left group on 22 June with 28 votes against Delphine Batho with 3 votes, Richard Ferrand was elected president of the La République En Marche group on 24 June with 306 votes and 2 abstentions, Marc Fesneau was unanimously elected president of the Democratic Movement group on 25 June with 42 votes, Mélenchon was unanimously elected president of la France insoumise group on 27 June, the "constructives" group selected Franck Riester (LR) and Stéphane Demilly (UDI) as co-chairs, and the GDR will continue to be presided over by André Chassaigne.

Composition of the National Assembly as of 30 October 2018
Parliamentary group		Members	Related	Total	President
LREM	La République En Marche	307	1	308	Gilles Le Gendre
LR	The Republicans	99	5	104	Christian Jacob
MoDem	Democratic Movement and affiliated	40	6	46	Patrick Mignola
NG	New Left	25	4	29	Valérie Rabault
UAI	UDI, Agir and Independents	27	1	28	Jean-Christophe Lagarde
FI	La France Insoumise	17	0	17	Jean-Luc Mélenchon
GDR	Democratic and Republican Left	16	0	16	André Chassaigne
LT	Libertés and Territories	16	0	16	Bertrand Pancher, Philippe Vigier
NI	Non-inscrits	–	–	12	–
Vacant, pending Essonne's 1st by-elections				1	–

=== Bureau of the National Assembly ===
The National Assembly elected six vice presidents, three quaestors, and twelve secretaries on 30 October 2018.

Composition of the bureau
Post	Name	Constituency	Group
President	Richard Ferrand	Finistère's 6th	LREM
Vice president	Carole Bureau-Bonnard	Oise's 6th	LREM
Vice president	Hugues Renson	Paris's 13th	LREM
Vice president	Sylvain Waserman	Bas-Rhin's 2nd constituency	Modem
Vice president	Marc Le Fur	Côtes-d'Armor's 3rd	LR
Vice president	Annie Genevard	Doubs's 5th	LR
Vice president	Maurice Leroy	Loir-et-Cher's 3rd	UAI
Quaestor	Florian Bachelier	Ille-et-Vilaine's 8th	LREM
Quaestor	Laurianne Rossi	Hauts-de-Seine's 11th	LREM
Quaestor	Éric Ciotti	Alpes-Maritimes's 1st	LR
Secretary	Lénaïck Adam	French Guiana's 2nd	LREM
Secretary	Ramlati Ali	Mayotte's 1st	LREM
Secretary	Clémentine Autain	Seine-Saint-Denis's 11th	FI
Secretary	Danielle Brulebois	Jura's 1st	LREM
Secretary	Luc Carvounas	Val-de-Marne's 9th	NG
Secretary	Lionel Causse	Landes's 2nd	LREM
Secretary	Laurence Dumont	Calvados's 2nd	NG
Secretary	Marie Guévenoux	Essonne's 9th	LREM
Secretary	Annaïg Le Meur	Finistère's 1st	LREM
Secretary	Sophie Mette	Gironde's 9th	MoDem
Secretary	Gabriel Serville	French Guiana's 1st	GDR
Secretary	Guillaume Vuilletet	Val-d'Oise's 2nd	LREM

==== Former members of National Assembly's Bureau ====
Post	Name	Constituency	Group	Mandate
President	François de Rugy	Loire-Atlantique's 1st	LREM	27 June 2017 – 4 September 2018
Vice president	Cendra Motin	Isère's 6th	LREM	28 June 2017 – 7 November 2017
Vice president	Danielle Brulebois	Jura's 1st	LREM	28 June 2017 – 7 November 2017
Vice president	Sacha Houlié	Vienne's 2nd	LREM	28 June 2017 – 16 January 2018
Vice president	Yves Jégo	Seine-et-Marne's 3rd	UAI	16 January 2018 - 15 July 2018
Quaestor	Thierry Solère	Hauts-de-Seine's 9th	UAI, later LREM	28 June 2017 – 16 January 2018
Secretary	Lénaïck Adam	French Guiana's 2nd	LREM	28 June 2017 – 8 December 2017
Secretary	Ramlati Ali	Mayotte's 1st	LREM	28 June 2017 – 19 January 2018
Secretary	Stéphanie Do	Seine-et-Marne's 10th	LREM	28 June 2017 – 31 January 2018
Secretary	Marie Lebec	Yvelines's 4th	LREM	1 February 2018 – 3 April 2018

=== Presidencies of committees ===
The presidencies of the eight standing committees was divided between the political groups on 29 June.

Presidencies of committees
Standing committees	President	Group
Cultural and Education Affairs Committee	Bruno Studer	LREM
Economic Affairs Committee	Roland Lescure	LREM
Foreign Affairs Committee	Marielle de Sarnez	MoDem
Social Affairs Committee	Brigitte Bourguignon	LREM
National Defence and Armed Forces Committee	Jean-Jacques Bridey	LREM
Sustainable Development, Spatial and Regional Planning Committee	Barbara Pompili	LREM
Finance, General Economy and Budgetary Monitoring Committee	Éric Woerth	LR
Constitutional Acts, Legislation and General Administration Committee	Yaël Braun-Pivet	LREM
Other committee	President	Group
European Affairs Committee	Sabine Thillaye	LREM

=== Vote of confidence ===
In the vote of confidence in the new government on 4 July 2017, 370 voted in favor, 67 opposed, and 129 abstained, representing a record level of abstention and the lowest level of opposition since 1959.

Vote of confidence on 4 July 2017
For		Against		Abstentions		Non-voting	
370	LREM (305); MoDem (46); LC (12); NG (3); NI (3); LR (1)	67	LR (23); FI (17); GDR (12); NI (10); NG (5)	129	LR (75); LC (23); NG (23); GDR (4); NI (4)	11	LREM (9); LR (1); MoDem (1)

=== Results of the legislative elections ===
Party or alliance		First round			Second round			Total seats	+/–
Party or alliance		Votes	%	Seats	Votes	%	Seats	Total seats	+/–
Presidential majority	La République En Marche!	6,391,269	28.21	2	7,826,245	43.06	306	308	New
Presidential majority	Democratic Movement	932,227	4.12	0	1,100,656	6.06	42	42	New
Presidential majority	Total	7,323,496	32.33	2	8,926,901	49.11	348	350	New
Parliamentary right	The Republicans	3,573,427	15.77	0	4,040,203	22.23	112	112	–82
Parliamentary right	Union of Democrats and Independents	687,225	3.03	1	551,784	3.04	17	18	–10
Parliamentary right	Miscellaneous right	625,345	2.76	0	306,074	1.68	6	6	–9
Parliamentary right	Total	4,885,997	21.57	1	4,898,061	26.95	135	136	–101
National Front		2,990,454	13.20	0	1,590,869	8.75	8	8	+6
La France Insoumise		2,497,622	11.03	0	883,573	4.86	17	17	New
Parliamentary left	Socialist Party	1,685,677	7.44	0	1,032,842	5.68	30	30	–250
Parliamentary left	Miscellaneous left	362,281	1.60	1	263,488	1.45	11	12	–10
Parliamentary left	Radical Party of the Left	106,311	0.47	0	64,860	0.36	3	3	–9
Parliamentary left	Total	2,154,269	9.51	1	1,361,190	7.49	44	45	–269
Ecologists (Note: Seat won by Europe Ecology – The Greens.)		973,527	4.30	0	23,197	0.13	1	1	0
French Communist Party		615,487	2.72	0	217,833	1.20	10	10	+3
Miscellaneous		500,309	2.21	0	100,574	0.55	3	3	–10
Debout la France		265,420	1.17	0	17,344	0.10	1	1	New
Regionalists		204,049	0.90	0	137,490	0.76	5	5	+3
Far-left		175,214	0.77	0				0	0
Far-right (Note: Seat won by League of the South)		68,320	0.30	0	19,034	0.10	1	1	0
Total		22,654,164	100.00	4	18,176,066	100.00	573	577	0
Valid votes		22,654,164	97.78		18,176,066	90.14			
Invalid votes		156,326	0.67		578,765	2.87			
Blank votes		357,018	1.54		1,409,784	6.99			
Total votes		23,167,508	100.00		20,164,615	100.00			
Registered voters/turnout		47,570,988	48.70		47,293,103	42.64			
Source: Ministry of the Interior

== Successive governments ==
- Philippe II from 21 June 2017 until 3 July 2020 lasting 3 years, 12 days
- Castex from 3 July 2020 lasting 6 years, 124 days
- Borne government from May 2022

== See also ==
- 2017 French legislative election
- National Assembly
- List of deputies of the 15th National Assembly of France
