= 2024–2025 French political crisis =

Political crisis following the 2024 legislative election

French political crisis
- Part of the Politics of France
- Date: 9 June 2024 – 10 October 2025 (1 year, 4 months and 1 day)
- Location: France
- Type: Political crisis
- Cause: Parliamentary dissolution and minority parliament in the National Assembly
- Outcome: Resignation of the Attal government and absence of a fully functioning government for three months; Fall of the Barnier and Bayrou governments. Resignation of the Lecornu I government; Formation of the Lecornu II government

France entered a period of political instability and crisis, unprecedented in the Fifth Republic, after the 2024 French legislative election called by President Emmanuel Macron in June 2024. The election resulted in a hung parliament split into three opposed blocs, each unable to command a majority: the left-wing New Popular Front alliance (180 out of 577 seats), Macron's centrist Ensemble alliance (159 seats), and the far-right National Rally (142 seats). This three-way split, as well as a French political culture averse to coalition government and compromise, resulted in Macron appointing four minority governments, headed by Michel Barnier, François Bayrou, and Sébastien Lecornu respectively. Barnier and Bayrou's governments both collapsed over budgetary disputes, and Lecornu resigned after less than a day, but was later reappointed.

== Background ==
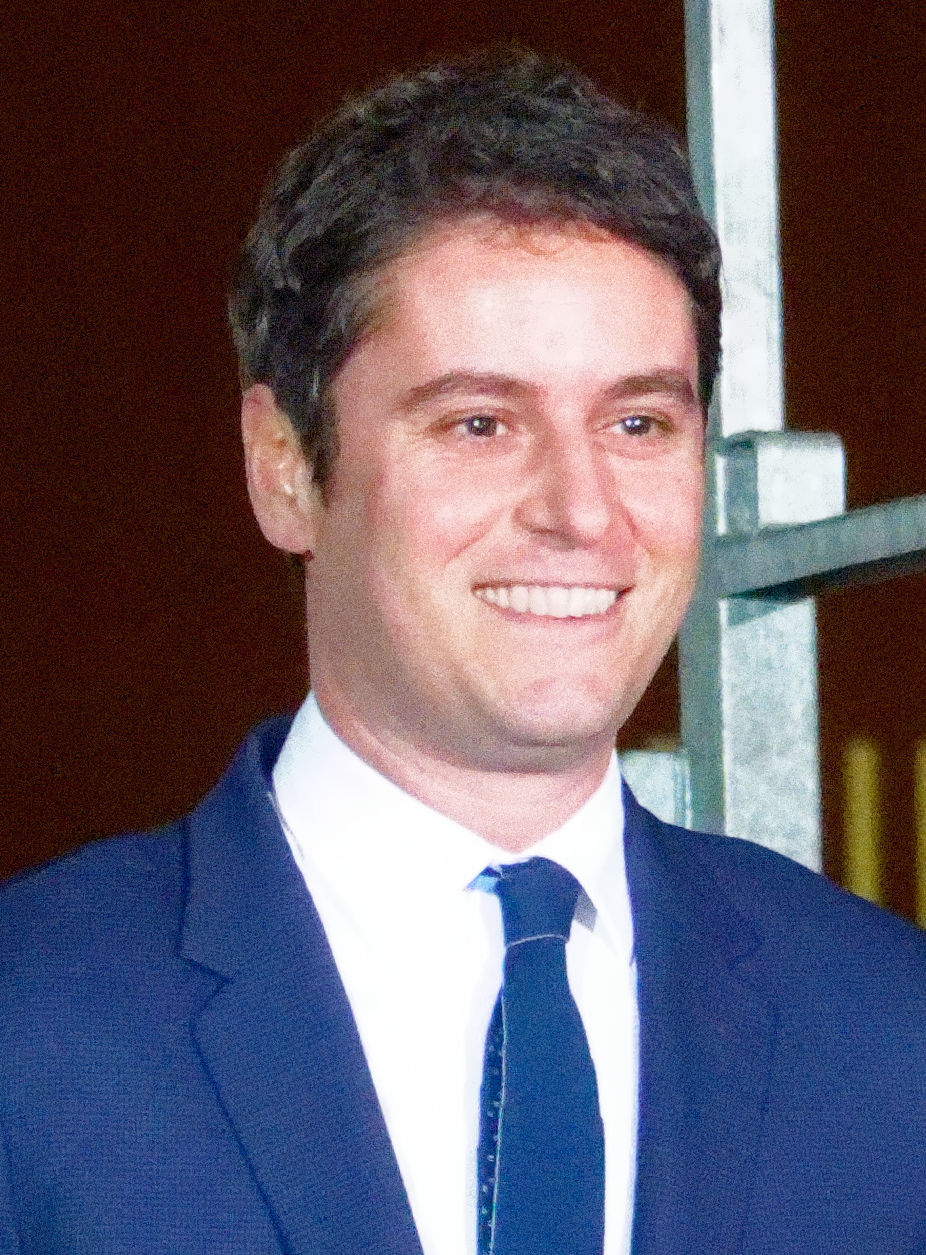
Prime minister Gabriel Attal in March 2024

The 2024 European Parliament election in France saw the National Rally arrive in first place with thirty seats out of a total of 80. In response, Macron dissolved the National Assembly and called a snap legislative election for 30 June and 7 July. The legislative election resulted in a hung parliament, with the left-wing coalition New Popular Front (NFP) leading a plurality of 193 MPs, above Macron's Renaissance in second place with 166 MPs, followed by the RN in third place with 142. The government of Gabriel Attal submitted its resignation on 15 July 2024. At the same time, it was engaged in trying to handle the 2024 New Caledonia unrest, following Renaissance's attempt to implement a controversial reform of voting rights on the island in May 2024.

== Events ==
=== Barnier government ===
Macron delayed the appointment of a new prime minister until after the 2024 Summer Olympics, announcing that an "Olympic truce" should be respected, which was already a singular choice in French politics. By mid-August, he had still not appointed a prime minister but instead announced his intention to consult with the various parties, which was done on 23 August.

On 26 August, after meeting the leaders of the National Rally (RN), Marine Le Pen and Jordan Bardella, Macron announced that, contrary to the usual practice of cohabitation in France, he would not appoint Lucie Castets, the candidate nominated by the NFP to become prime minister. This decision exacerbated the crisis, and France Unbowed (LFI), the main party within the NFP, announced its intention to initiate impeachment proceedings against him. While Macron favoured the formation of a centrist coalition, and called for another round of consultations, the Greens and a faction of the Socialist Party (PS), both minority members of the NFP, announced their refusal to participate in further discussions. The National Rally (RN), meanwhile, maintained a low-key attitude, aiming to capitalize on the disputes between Macron and the leftist parties that won the elections. Various organizations called for protests and strikes to be held on 7 September.

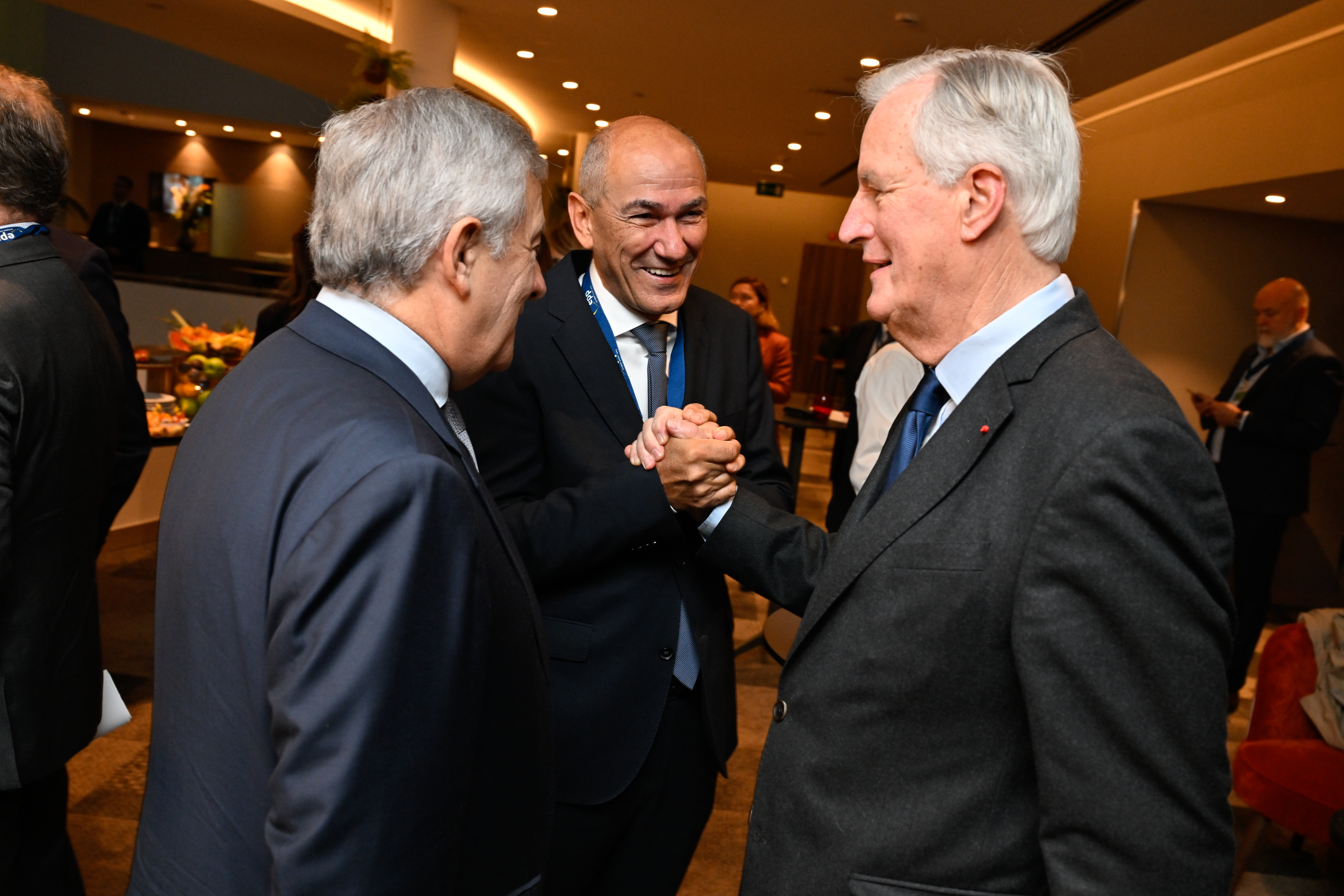
Prime minister Michel Barnier (right), during a European People's Party meeting in Brussels

On 28 August, former president François Hollande, himself a member of the NFP, called the crisis an "institutional fault". On the same day, Macron announced that he would meet the leaders of the French regions. On 29 August, the Socialist Party opened its summer university, where two opposing factions were expected to clash: those aligned with the political stance of the party's president, Olivier Faure, supporting Lucie Castets' candidacy, and the dissenters, such as Carole Delga and Bernard Cazeneuve, who advocated for an alliance with Emmanuel Macron's party and what they call the "republican forces".

Macron notably spoke with Delga on the morning of the 29th. Meanwhile, the General Confederation of Labour (CGT), France's largest trade union, condemned what it called a "power grab" by Macron and called for a day of strikes and protests on 1 October against the budget announced by the caretaker government, while refusing to say to participate in the 7 September planned protests, announcing that they preferred to focus on social and economic issues instead of political ones. The same evening, Ségolène Royal, a former Socialist Party candidate in the 2007 presidential election, who left the party in 2017 when she was appointed as an ambassador by Macron before "discreetly" rejoining the party in 2021 after being ousted from said post, announced that she was "available" for the position.

President Macron named Michel Barnier as prime minister on 5 September. The caretaker Attal government remained in place for 51 days, unprecedented since the fallen Pompidou government lasted 62 days in 1962. If no government had been appointed by 16 September, it would have been the longest period under a caretaker government in modern French history. Barnier appointed his minority government composed of Ensemble and The Republicans nicknamed the Socle commun. The NFP declared its opposition to the new government and proceeded to call a vote of no confidence, which failed due to the abstention of the RN.

==== Collapse ====
Motion of no confidence
Ballot →	4 December 2024
Required majority →	288 out of 575 ✓
Votes in favour: • RN (123); • LFI (71); • SOC (65); • ECO (38); • GDR (16); • UDR (16); • LIOT (1); • NI (1)	331 / 575
Abstentions or absentees (Note: In the French National Assembly, motions of no confidence are voted on by open ballot, with only those in favor of the motion taking part in the vote. Since a majority of the entire membership is required, those who are absent or do not cast a ballot are de facto voting against.)	244 / 575

On 4 December, following its usage of article 49.3 of the French constitution in order to push a social service financing bill without a parliamentary vote, the government was toppled by a motion of no confidence; it was the first government to suffer such a fate since 1962 and became the shortest-tenured in the history of the Fifth Republic. The French Parliament subsequently passed an "emergency law" which renewed the previous year's budget without any alteration.

=== Bayrou government ===
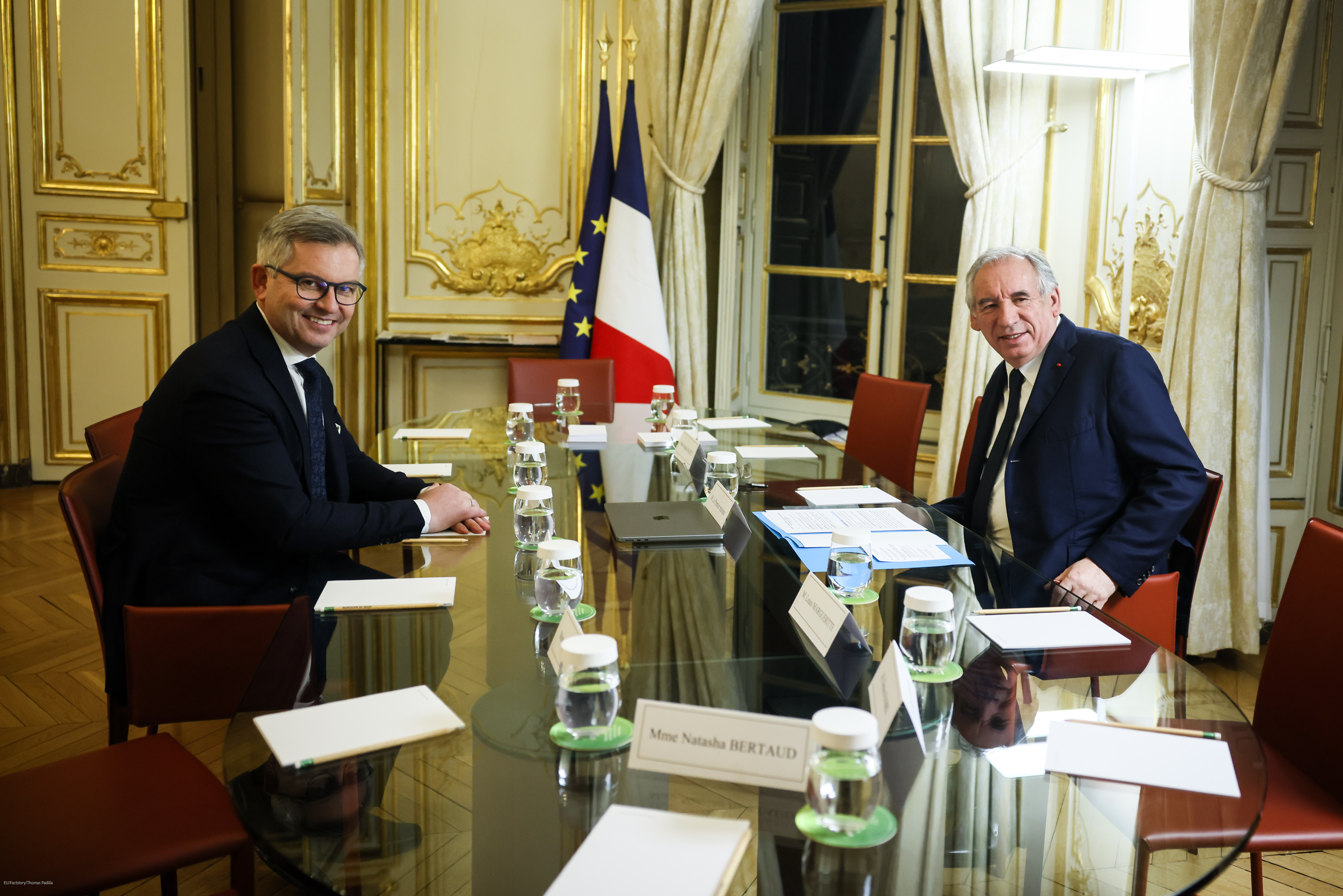
Prime minister François Bayrou (right), during a meeting with European commissioner Magnus Brunner

On 13 December, Macron appointed Democratic Movement leader François Bayrou as prime minister. According to Le Monde, the appointment of Bayrou was decided on at the last minute, with Macron originally telling Bayrou that he would not be named Prime Minister, only to be forced to appoint Bayrou shortly afterwards when Bayrou threatened to pull his support from Macron. Following Bayrou's appointment, Moody's Ratings cut the French credit rating, saying that it was "our view that the country's public finances will be substantially weakened over the coming years" and that "political fragmentation is more likely to impede meaningful fiscal consolidation."

==== Collapse ====
Question of confidence
Ballot →	8 September 2025
Required majority →	280 out of 573 ✗
Votes in favour: • ER (90); • LD (36); • HOR (34); • DR (27); • LIOT (4); • NI (3)	194 / 573
Votes against: • RN (123); • LFI (71); • SOC (66); • ECO (38); • GDR (17); • UDR (15); • LIOT (15); • DR (13); • NI (6)	364 / 573
Abstentions: • DR (9); • LIOT (4); • ER (1); • NI (1)	15 / 573

In the summer, Bayrou presented an austerity budget for 2026, which was endorsed by Macron's centrist alliance but faced opposition from both the left and the right. Bayrou refused to negotiate and instead called for a vote of confidence under article 49.1 of the Constitution. The vote, held on 8 September, resulted in a heavy defeat for Bayrou, with 194 votes in favor of the government and 364 against. The National Rally and the New Popular Front voted against alongside other minor parties.

=== Lecornu governments ===
Macron appointed Sébastien Lecornu as prime minister on 9 September 2025. Lecornu presented his cabinet on 5 October, but resigned the next day, making him the shortest-serving prime minister in the history of the French Fifth Republic. Lecornu's initial resignation was triggered by threats from the right-wing Les Républicains to leave the government, as well as by immediate threats of a vote of no confidence from the left-wing and right-wing blocs in the National Assembly. The non-centrist parties all objected to Lecornu installing a cabinet that was largely identical to Bayrou's previous one. Opposition leaders demanded that Macron resign or call snap elections. Macron instead asked Lecornu to lead "final negotiations" with the other parties to determine whether a stable government could still be brought about. Macron reappointed Lecornu as prime minister on 10 October. The government survived a vote of no-confidence six days later, which only got 271 votes instead of the 289 necessary. The Republicans and the Socialist Party voted against the motion after the latter reached an agreement on pension reform.

== Timeline ==
Cabinets before all ministers were named and caretaker governments shown with a thinner line.

== See also ==
- Bulgarian political crisis (2021–2026)
- Cabinet crisis
