= Liberties, Independents, Overseas and Territories =

French parliamentary group

Liberties, Independents, Overseas and Territories Libertés, indépendants, outre-mer & territoires
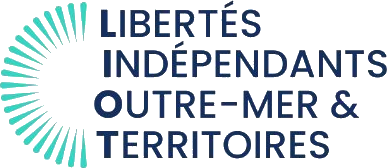
- Chamber: National Assembly
- Legislature(s): 15th and 16th (Fifth Republic)
- Foundation: 17 October 2018
- Member parties: Rad; LC; FD; FaC; UDI; DVD; DVG; RES (formerly)
- President: Bertrand Pancher; Christophe Naegelen (co-presidents)
- Constituency: Meuse's 1st Vosges's 3rd
- Representation: 21 / 577
- Ideology: Conservatism; Liberalism
- Website: groupeliot.fr

Liberties, Independents, Overseas and Territories (French: Libertés, Indépendants, Outre-mer & Territoires, LIOT), formerly Liberties & Territories (French: Libertés & territoires, LT), (Note: From 2018 to 2022) is a catch-all parliamentary group in the French National Assembly. It was formed on 17 October 2018, with deputies from centre-left and centre-right parties, as well as Corsican nationalist parties.

== History ==
The group was formed on 17 October 2018, led by co-presidents Bertrand Pancher from Meuse and Philippe Vigier from Eure-et-Loir. Prior negotiations between Corsican nationalist deputies, Olivier Falorni and François Pupponi had failed at the beginning of the 15th legislature.

Previous logo of the group

At its founding, the group defined itself as in the "minority", refusing to register as either being in the majority or in opposition to the government. This led to a disagreement over their placement in the National Assembly. The group's deputies demanded to be placed together in the centre of the hemicycle, which was declined. They protested by boycotting the photograph of the Assembly bringing together all the deputies. The group ultimately joined the opposition on 30 July 2020.

Following the 2022 legislative election, the group was central in a March 2023 attempt at dismissing the minority government of Prime Minister Élisabeth Borne through a motion of no confidence presented by Pancher and defended in front of Parliament by Charles de Courson. It was rejected by 9 votes. All group members voted in favour, except two who abstained.

Although five LIOT deputies were invested under the banner of the New Popular Front in the 2024 legislative election, several indicated that they did not wish to be associated with it. According to Laurent Panifous, the parliamentary group is likely to continue past 2024 should a sufficient number of incumbent deputies be re-elected.

== Membership ==
=== Members (15th legislature) ===
Name	Party
Jean-Félix Acquaviva	FaC
Sylvain Brial	DVD
Michel Castellani	FaC
Jean-Michel Clément	PP
Paul-André Colombani	PNC
Charles de Courson	LC
Jeanine Dubié	PRG
Frédérique Dumas	DVD
Olivier Falorni	PRG
Stéphanie Kerbarh	MR
Jean Lassalle	RES
François-Michel Lambert	LEF
Paul Molac	DVG
Sébastien Nadot	MDP
Bertrand Pancher	Rad
Benoît Simian	Horizons
Jennifer de Temmerman	DVG

=== Former members (15th legislature) ===
Name	Party	Notes
Matthieu Orphelin	FaC	Joined EDS group
M'jid El Guerrab	MR	Joined AE group
Philippe Vigier	UDI	Joined MoDem group
Yannick Favennec	UDI	Joined MoDem group
Sandrine Josso	UDI	Joined MoDem group
François Pupponi	Formerly PS	Joined MoDem group
Martine Wonner	Formerly LREM	Excluded from group

=== Election results ===
Year	Seats	Change
2022	16 / 577	New
2024	21 / 577	▲5

=== List of presidents ===
Co-president				Co-president			
Name	Term start	Term end	Notes	Name	Term start	Term end	Notes
Bertrand Pancher	17 October 2018	Current	Member of Rad	Philippe Vigier	17 October 2018	8 September 2020	Member of UDI; Joined the MoDem group
Bertrand Pancher	17 October 2018	Current	Member of Rad	Sylvia Pinel	16 September 2020	21 June 2022	Member of PRG
Bertrand Pancher	17 October 2018	Current	Member of Rad	Christophe Naegelen	28 June 2022	Current	Member of UDI
