= Philippe Vigier =

French politician (born 1958)

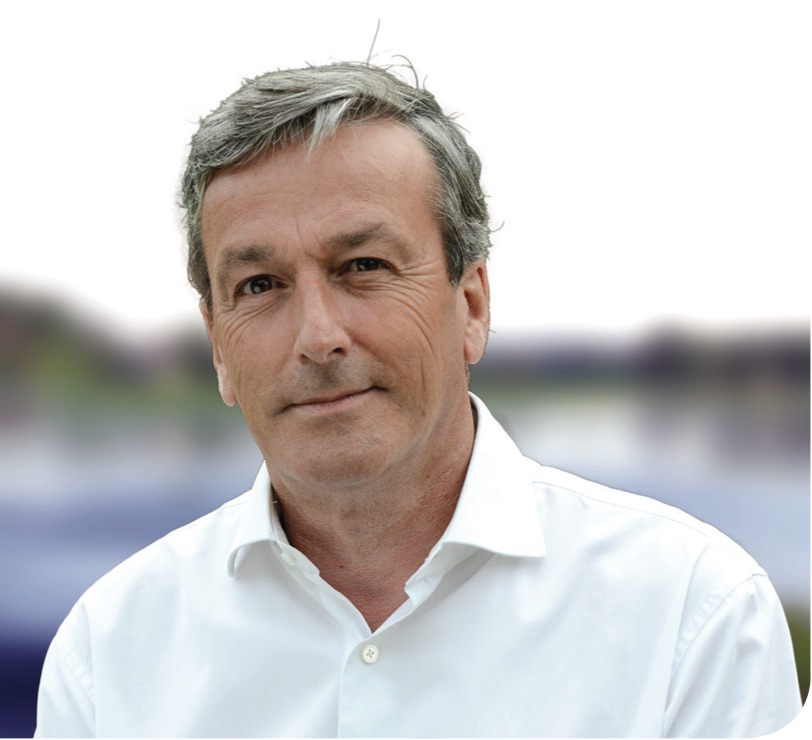

Minister Delegate for the Overseas
- In office 20 July 2023 – 11 January 2024
- Prime Minister: Élisabeth Borne
- Preceded by: Jean-François Carenco
- Succeeded by: Marie Guévenoux

President of the Liberties, Independents, Overseas and Territories group in the National Assembly
- In office 17 October 2018 – 8 September 2020; Served with Bertrand Pancher
- Preceded by: Group established
- Succeeded by: Sylvia Pinel

President of the Union of Democrats and Independents group in the National Assembly
- In office 14 April 2014 – 20 June 2017
- Preceded by: Jean-Louis Borloo
- Succeeded by: Stéphane Demilly; Franck Riester

Member of the National Assembly for Eure-et-Loir's 4th constituency
- Incumbent
- Assumed office 12 February 2024
- Preceded by: Laurent Leclercq
- In office 20 June 2007 – 20 August 2023
- Preceded by: Alain Venot
- Succeeded by: Laurent Leclercq

Mayor of Cloyes-sur-le-Loir
- In office 18 March 2001 – 4 September 2017
- Preceded by: Jacques Jouvelet
- Succeeded by: Claude Martin

Personal details
- Born: 3 February 1958 (age 68) Valence, France
- Party: Democratic Movement (2020–present)
- Other political affiliations: Union for French Democracy (until 2007); The Centrists (2007–2020); Union of Democrats and Independents (2012–2017)
- Education: Clermont Auvergne University

Philippe Vigier (French pronunciation: [filip viʒje]; born 3 February 1958) is a French politician who served as Minister Delegate for the Overseas in the government of Prime Minister Élisabeth Borne from 2023 to 2024.

A member of the Democratic Movement (MoDem), which he joined in 2020 upon leaving The Centrists (LC), he has represented the 4th constituency of the Eure-et-Loir department in the National Assembly since 2024, previously holding the seat from 2007 until his appointment to the government in 2023. Vigier has also held a seat in the Regional Council of Centre-Val de Loire since 2021, previously holding office from 1995 to 2014 when the region was named Centre.

== Early life and education ==
At age 16, Vigier campaigned for Valéry Giscard d'Estaing in the 1974 presidential election.

== Political career ==
=== Career in local politics ===
A biologist by occupation, Vigier became a Deputy Mayor of Châteaudun and regional councillor of Centre in 1995, positions he held until 1998 and 2014, respectively. In 2001, he was elected to the mayorship of Cloyes-sur-le-Loir, Eure-et-Loir, which he held until 2017.

In the 2015 regional election, Vigier led the Union of the Right and Centre (UDC) list in Centre-Val de Loire (formerly Centre). Despite favourable polls, the UDC list was narrowly defeated in the second round by the Socialist Party list led by outgoing Regional Council President François Bonneau. Vigier declined to take a seat in the regional council. In 2021, he was returned to the regional council on the Democratic Movement list led by Agriculture Minister Marc Fesneau.

=== Deputy in the National Assembly ===
In the 2007 legislative election, Vigier was elected to the National Assembly in the first round with 57.1% of the vote in the 4th constituency of Eure-et-Loir with the support of President Nicolas Sarkozy's Union for a Popular Movement. He was reelected in 2012 with 50.7% of the first-round vote.

In Parliament, Vigier presided over the Union of Democrats and Independents group from 2014 to 2017. In 2018, he was a founding member of the Liberties and Territories group, which he co-presided until leaving for the Democratic Movement group in 2020.

Vigier served on the Committee on Social Affairs; he was a member of the Committee on Finance from 2007 to 2019. In addition to his committee assignments, he was a member of the French parliamentary friendship groups with Armenia and Italy. He also served as member of the French delegation to the Parliamentary Assembly of the Council of Europe from 2022, where he was part of the Committee on Social Affairs, Health and Sustainable Development.

In the 2024 snap election, Vigier was reelected with 51.7% of the second-round vote, despite placing second in the first round behind Roger Pécout of The Republicans, who also had the support of the National Rally as part of the Union of the Far-Right.

=== In government ===
On 20 July 2023, Vigier was appointed Minister Delegate for the Overseas under Interior Minister Gérald Darmanin, in the government of Prime Minister Élisabeth Borne, replacing Jean-François Carenco. On 11 January 2024, less than six months into his position, he was succeeded by Marie Guévenoux, returning to the National Assembly.
