= Agir (France) =

Act, the Constructive Right Agir, la droite constructive
- President: Franck Riester
- Founded: 26 November 2017; 7 years ago
- Split from: The Republicans
- Ideology: Conservative liberalism Pro-Europeanism
- Political position: Centre-right
- National affiliation: Renaissance; Ensemble
- European Parliament group: Renew Europe
- Colors: Blue; Amaranth
- National Assembly: 5 / 577
- Senate: 6 / 348
- European Parliament: 1 / 81

Website
- agir-ladroiteconstructive.fr

Agir (French: [aʒiʁ]), officially Agir, la droite constructive (lit. 'Act, the Constructive Right'), is a political party in France, established on 26 November 2017. The majority of its founding members were previously associated with the Constructive faction within The Republicans. Styling itself as a "liberal, social, European, humanist and reformist" party, Agir was founded by a group of 19 established politicians as an alternative to The Republicans. The party merged with Renaissance (formerly La République En Marche!) as an "associate party" in 2022.

Agir Members of Parliament (MPs) were members of the Agir ensemble parliamentary group in the National Assembly. Fabienne Keller was the party's only Member of the European Parliament (MEP).

== History ==
=== Formation ===
Following the defeat of Les Républicains (LR) candidate François Fillon in the first round of the 2017 French presidential election and the ascension of Laurent Wauquiez, perceived as coming from the right wing of Les Républicains, to the leadership of the party, 19 politicians from LR and the centre-right Union of Democrats and Independents formed the group.

=== Coalition and merger ===
In the run-up to the 2022 French presidential election, Agir joined and formed part of the Ensemble Citoyens coalition, which supported President Emmanuel Macron in his re-election bid. The party grew closer to Macron's political camp following the election, and when it was later announced that his party would attempt to unify the presidential majority into a single party grouping, Agir took steps towards integrating into the ruling majority. Ultimately, Agir merged into Macron's party as it reformed and rebranded under the name Renaissance on 17 September 2022.

== Ideology ==
Agir was identified as part of centre-right politics, defining itself as pro-European, liberal and humanist, and rejecting the "identitarian, authoritarian, eurosceptic and ultra-conservative" right.

== Prominent members ==
=== Deputies ===
Agir had 12 Members of Parliament in the 15th assembly. In the 2022 French legislative election, 6 were elected as part of the Ensemble Citoyens coalition.

==== 15th National Assembly of France ====
Name	Former party	Constituency
Olivier Becht	LR	Haut-Rhin's 5th constituency
Pierre-Yves Bournazel	LR	Paris's 18th constituency
Paul Christophe	LR	Nord's 14th constituency
Agnès Firmin-Le Bodo	LR	Seine-Maritime's 7th constituency
Antoine Herth	LR	Bas-Rhin's 5th constituency
Dimitri Houbron	LREM	Nord's 17th constituency
Aina Kuric	LREM	Marne's 2nd constituency
Laure de La Raudière	LR	Eure-et-Loir's 3rd constituency
Luc Lamirault	LR	Eure-et-Loir's 3rd constituency
Vincent Ledoux	LR	Nord's 10th constituency
Patricia Lemoine	LR	Seine-et-Marne's 5th constituency
Lise Magnier	LR	Marne's 4th constituency

==== 16th National Assembly of France ====
- Olivier Becht
- Paul Christophe
- Thomas Gassilloud
- Franck Riester
- Charles Rodwell
- Charles Sitzenstuhl
- Lionel Vuibert

=== Senators ===
Agir has 6 Senators.

Name	Former party	Constituency
Emmanuel Capus	LR	Maine-et-Loire
Marie-Agnès Évrard	LR	Yonne
Ludovic Haye	LR	Haut-Rhin
Claude Malhuret	LR	Allier
Pierre Médevielle	UDI	Haute-Garonne
Colette Mélot	LR	Seine-et-Marne

=== MEP ===
- Fabienne Keller

== Election results ==
=== European Parliament ===
Election year	Votes	%	Seats	+/−
2019	5,079,015 (Renaissance)	22.42	1 / 79	▼1
