= Bertrand Pancher =

French politician

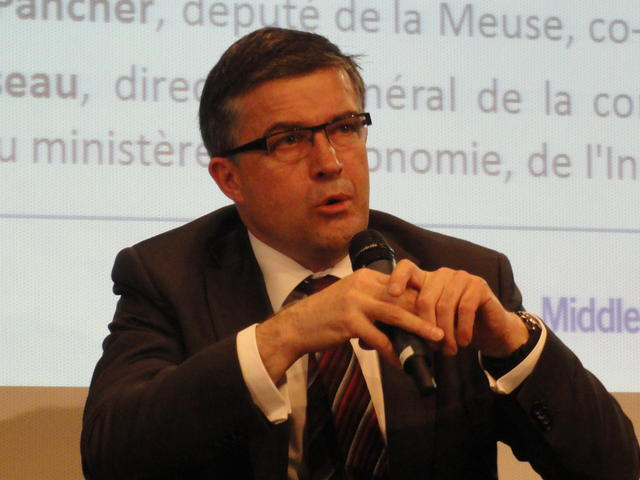

Member of the National Assembly for Meuse's 1st constituency
- Incumbent
- Assumed office 2007
- Preceded by: François Dosé

Personal details
- Born: 5 June 1958 (age 67) Saint-Mihiel, France
- Party: Radical Party

Bertrand Pancher (French pronunciation: [bɛʁtʁɑ̃ pɑ̃ʃɛʁ]; born 5 June 1958, in Saint-Mihiel) is a French politician of the Radical Party (Rad) who has been serving as a member of the National Assembly of France since the 2007 elections, representing the Meuse department.

== Political career ==
In the National Assembly, Pancher has been a member of the Committee on Cultural Affairs and Education since 2019. He has previously served on the Committee on Legal Affairs (2007-2009) and the Committee on Sustainable Development and Spatial Planning (2009-2020). In addition to his committee assignments, he is part of the French parliamentary friendship groups with the Democratic Republic of the Congo, Niger, and Tunisia.

In 2018, Pancher was one of the founding members of the Liberties and Territories (LT) parliamentary group, which he has been co-chairing with Philippe Vigier (2018-2020) and Sylvia Pinel (since 2020).
