= Radical Movement =

Radical Movement Mouvement radical
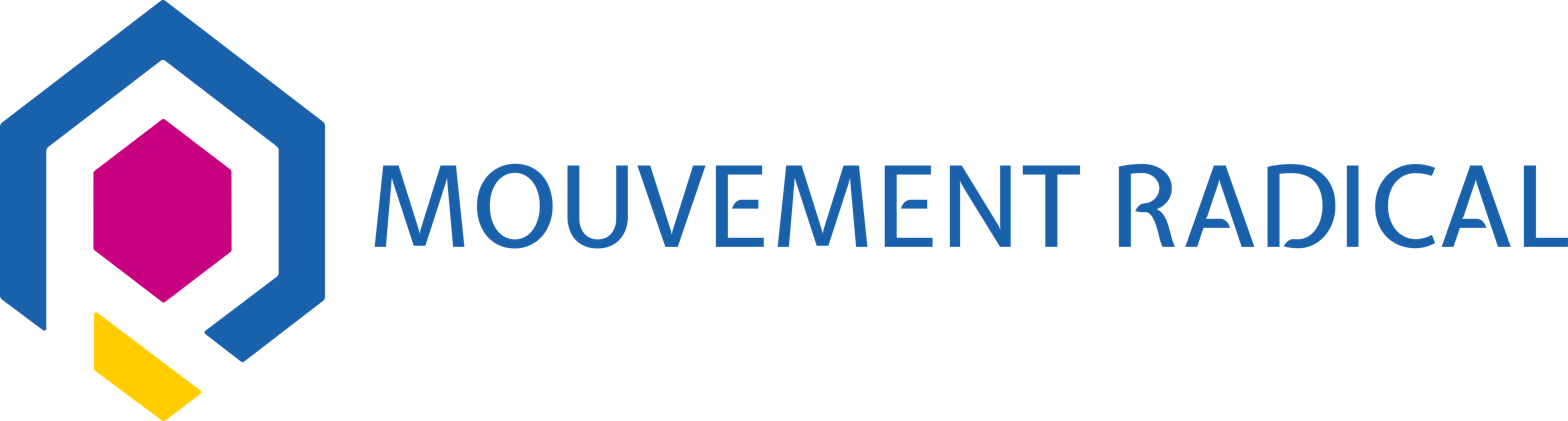
- Founded: 10 December 2017
- Dissolved: 12 September 2021
- Merger of: Radical Party; Radical Party of the Left
- Succeeded by: Radical Party
- Headquarters: 1, place de Valois; 75001 Paris
- Membership (2017): ▲15,000 claimed adherents
- Ideology: Social liberalism
- Political position: Centre
- Colours: Mauve
- Slogan: Ouverts, unis, indépendants "Open, United, Independent"

The Radical Movement (French: Mouvement radical, MR), officially the Radical, Social and Liberal Movement (French: Mouvement radical, social et libéral), was a liberal, radical and social-liberal political party in France.

The party aimed at being an "alternative to the right–left paradigm".

== History ==
The Radical Party (PR) was founded in 1901 as the Republican, Radical and Radical-Socialist Party. In 1972, the left wing of the party split and formed the Radical Party of the Left (PRG). The two parties were part of different political alliances, with the PR part of the centre-right, successively the Union for French Democracy, Union for a Popular Movement and Union of Democrats and Independents, while the PRG allied with the Socialist Party on the centre-left, with PRG leader Sylvia Pinel contesting the Socialist Party presidential primary in January 2017.

The idea for a united Radical Party was promoted in June 2017 after the presidential election in which Emmanuel Macron won the presidential election as the candidate for the centrist La République En Marche!.

The two parties were officially merged into the MR on 10 December 2017.

The party joined the Alliance of Liberals and Democrats for Europe on 9 November 2018. The LGBT association GayLib joined the party on 18 June 2018.

In February 2019, faction of ex-PRG members, including its last president Sylvia Pinel, split from the Radical Movement due to its expected alliance with La République En Marche in the European elections and plans to resurrect the PRG, who will meet on 16 March to move toward the reconstitution of the old party.

In 2021 its president Laurent Hénart announced that the Radical Movement would "become again" the Radical Party.

== Ideology ==
There were eight core ideas that the party stated at the founding congress.

- Freedom
- Equality
- Fraternity
- Secularism
- Security
- Environmental protection
- Commitment to Europe
- Humanism

== Election results ==
=== European Parliament ===
Election year	Votes	%	Seats	+/−
2019	5,079,015 (Renaissance)	22.42	1 / 79	▼1

== See also ==
- Liberalism and radicalism in France
