= UDI and Independents group =

Former centre-right parliamentary group in France

UDI and Independent deputies Députés UDI & indépendants
- Chamber: National Assembly
- Legislature(s): 14th & 15th (Fifth Republic)
- Foundation: 26 June 2012
- Dissolution: 21 June 2022
- Previous name(s): UDI group (2012–2017); The Constructives: Republicans, UDI, Independents group (2017); UDI, Agir and Independents group (2017–2019; 2019–2020)
- Member parties: UDI; DVD
- President: Jean-Christophe Lagarde (final)
- Constituency: Seine-Saint-Denis's 5th
- Ideology: Liberalism
- Website: Facebook page

The UDI and Independent deputies (French: Députés UDI & indépendants) was a parliamentary group in the National Assembly of France including members of the Union of Democrats and Independents (UDI), Agir (2017–2020), and some dissidents of The Republicans (LR) after the 2017 legislative election. It was formed in 2012 and dissolved in 2022.

== History ==
On 26 June 2012, the UDI group was founded in the aftermath of the 2012 legislative election.

In the aftermath of the legislative elections on 11 and 18 June 2017, the split between Macron-compatible "constructives" within the Republicans (LR) and the rest of the party re-emerged. On 21 June, Thierry Solère announced the creation of a new common group in the National Assembly with the Union of Democrats and Independents (UDI) likely to contain 18 UDI and about 15 LR deputies. The formation of two parliamentary groups on the right represented a symbolic divorce to the two threads on the right (the moderates and the hardliners) and the end of the old Union for a Popular Movement (UMP) which had been created in 2002 to unite the right and centre.

On 27 June, the group announced that Franck Riester (LR) and Stéphane Demilly (UDI) would preside as co-presidents. At the time of its formation on 27 June, the parliamentary group included 35 deputies, including 1 associated member.

On 28 November, following the establishment of the political party Agir by LR members, the group was renamed to the UDI, Agir and Independents group (groupe UDI, Agir et indépendants), with Jean-Christophe Lagarde replacing Demilly as part of the rotating co-presidency of the group. Simultaneously, Thierry Solère, after his exclusion from the Republicans as a result of his role in the constructives and subsequent adhesion with La République En Marche!, voluntarily left for the La République En Marche group.

Marine Brenier left the group to rejoin The Republicans group on 23 January 2018, and the invalidation of the election of Napole Polutele on 2 February reduced the group by one more and triggered a by-election.

=== Exclusion from The Republicans ===
Following the election of Emmanuel Macron as president under the banner of En Marche! and the subsequent appointment of three right-wing personalities in prominent posts in the newly formed government – Édouard Philippe as Prime Minister, Bruno Le Maire as French Ministry for the Economy and Finance, and Gérald Darmanin as Minister of Public Action and Accounts – a parliamentary group including LR dissidents supportive of the government, "The Constructives", was formed in the National Assembly, separate from the existing LR group. After the election of Thierry Solère, one of the founding LR members of the group, as a quaestor on 28 June – a post traditionally reserved for the opposition, with the group having declared itself as an opposition group regardless of its line towards the government – many party figures added to calls for the exclusion of LR "constructive" deputies and ministers, including Philippe, Le Maire, Darmanin, Sébastien Lecornu, Thierry Solère, and Franck Riester, from the party. The issue was to be raised at the meeting of political bureau of the party on 11 July, with the "constructive" deputies publicly declaring that to be excluded would be of "no importance", and tentative proposals for the creation of "a new political force" consisting of the "constructive" LR deputies and members of the Union of Democrats and Independents (UDI), who formed the backbone of the group.

Following the meeting of the political bureau on 11 July, Accoyer announced the creation of a "special commission" headed by Isabelle Le Callennec, Patrick Ollier, and Jean Leonetti tasked with "collecting the explanations" of Philippe, Le Maire, Darmanin, Lecornu, Solère, and Riester, and their immediate suspension from executive functions within the party, a compromise to postpone the decision on the possible exclusion of the six until the autumn in order to avoid pushing the "constructives" towards launching their own party. In an interview in Le Journal du Dimanche published on 24 October, Le Maire confirmed that he was no longer a member of The Republicans and confirmed that he was an adherent of La République En Marche, thereby resolving the question of his exclusion from LR. On 28 September, the five remaining received a letter from The Republicans summoning them to offer an explanation to the party for their support for Macron. On 3 October, the political bureau of the party initially voted to exclude Darmanin for "electoral dissidence" by appearing on an election list for La République En Marche in the department of Nord in the 2017 senatorial elections, but quickly reversing that decision, instead granting to Darmanin and the other four threatened with exclusion an additional eight days to respond. in addition, the political bureau also demanded that certain "constructive" deputies join the LR group by 30 November or else be excluded by the party.

In interviews on 4 October, both Solère and Riester envisaged the possibility of creating a new party of the right and centre representing "liberal, social, European, reformist and humanist" values. On the part of the ministers, Lecornu stated that he would appeal should he be excluded, Darmanin confirmed to have sent a response but would ultimately prefer exclusion by the party than abandonment of his political line, and Philippe was indifferent about the possibility of becoming a Prime Minister not associated with a political party, saying that the "political commitment [as Prime Minister] in my opinion is well worth the [loss of the] partisan label".

After no action was taken on 11 October, Accoyer stated that "the procedure will be completed on 24 October". At the meeting of the LR political bureau on 24 October, 37 of 47 participants voted in favor of exclusion. However, because fewer than 63 members (a majority of the body) were present, as required by the party statutes, the vote was not considered binding, and the political bureau must convene for a second time on 31 October to vote again in order to formally exclude the five, when only a simple majority of votes will be required. Darmamin, Lecornu, Solère, and Riester were formally excluded by the political bureau of the party on 31 October; Philippe was not formally excluded due to juridical reasons, though the party noted his departure. On 25 November, Le Journal du Dimanche reported that Darmamin, Lecornu, and Solère joined La République En Marche, while Riester, along with most LR members of the constructives and Senate group, announced the establishment of a new party, Agir, on the right.

== List of presidents ==
Name	Term start	Term end	Notes
Franck Riester	27 June 2017	28 November 2017	
Stéphane Demilly	27 June 2017	28 November 2017	
Franck Riester	28 November 2017	16 November 2018	
Jean-Christophe Lagarde	28 November 2017	present	

== Historical membership ==
Year	Seats	Change	Notes
2012	32 / 577	Steady	
2017	35 / 577	▲3	

== See also ==
- The Independents – Republic and Territories group
