= The Democrats (parliamentary group) =

Majority centrist parliamentary group in France

The Democrats Les Démocrates
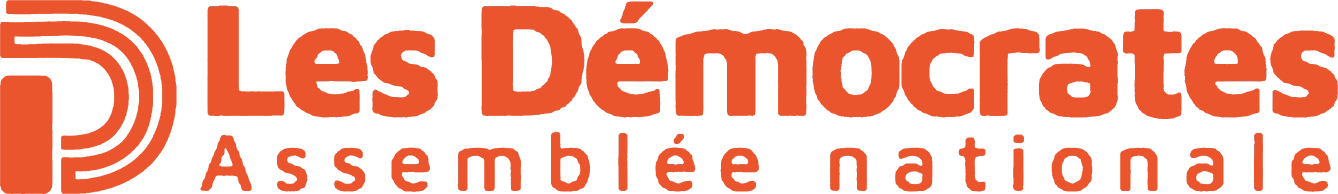
- Chamber: National Assembly
- Legislature(s): 15th, 16th and 17th (Fifth Republic)
- Foundation: 27 June 2017
- Previous name(s): Democratic Movement and Affiliated Group (2017–2020); Democratic Movement and Affiliated Democrats Group (2020–2022); Democratic, MoDem and Independents Group (2022–2024)
- Member parties: Democratic Movement
- President: Marc Fesneau
- Constituency: Pyrénées-Atlantiques's 2nd
- Representation: 36 / 577

The Democrats (French: Les Démocrates [le demɔkʁat]), known as the Democratic, MoDem and Independents Group (French: Groupe démocrate, MoDem et indépendants) until 2024, is a parliamentary group in the French National Assembly including representatives of the Democratic Movement (MoDem).

Formed following the 2017 legislative election, it is currently the fifth-largest group in the National Assembly.

== History ==
After the rallying of MoDem leader François Bayrou to the presidential candidacy of Emmanuel Macron, supported by En Marche (later La République En Marche! and Renaissance), the party was reserved dozens of constituencies in the subsequent legislative election, hoping to secure at least 15 deputies, the number required to form a parliamentary group. The party ultimately won 42 seats in the National Assembly.

On 25 June 2017, Marc Fesneau was unanimously elected president of the MoDem parliamentary group by its 42 members. At the time of its official formation on 27 June, the parliamentary group had 47 deputies, including 4 associated members.

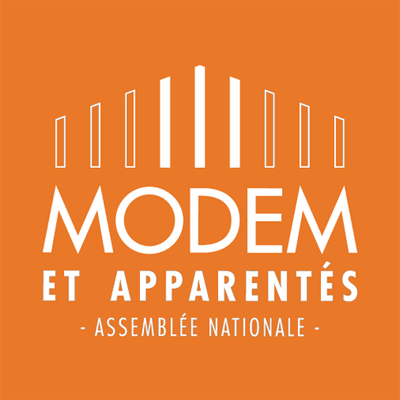
First group logo, in use until 2020

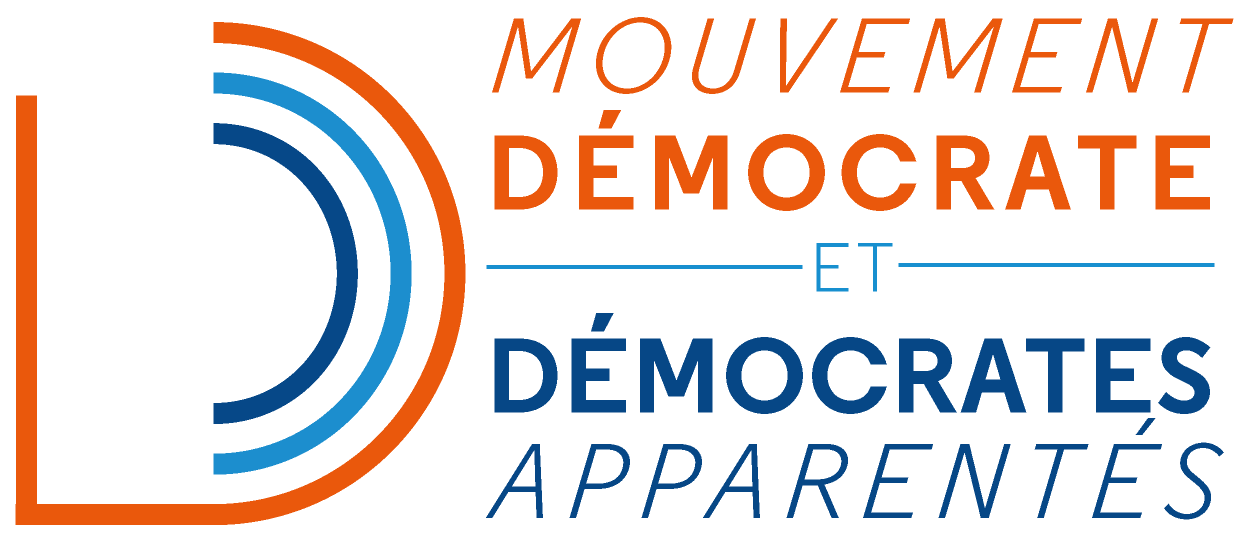
Second group logo, in use until 2022

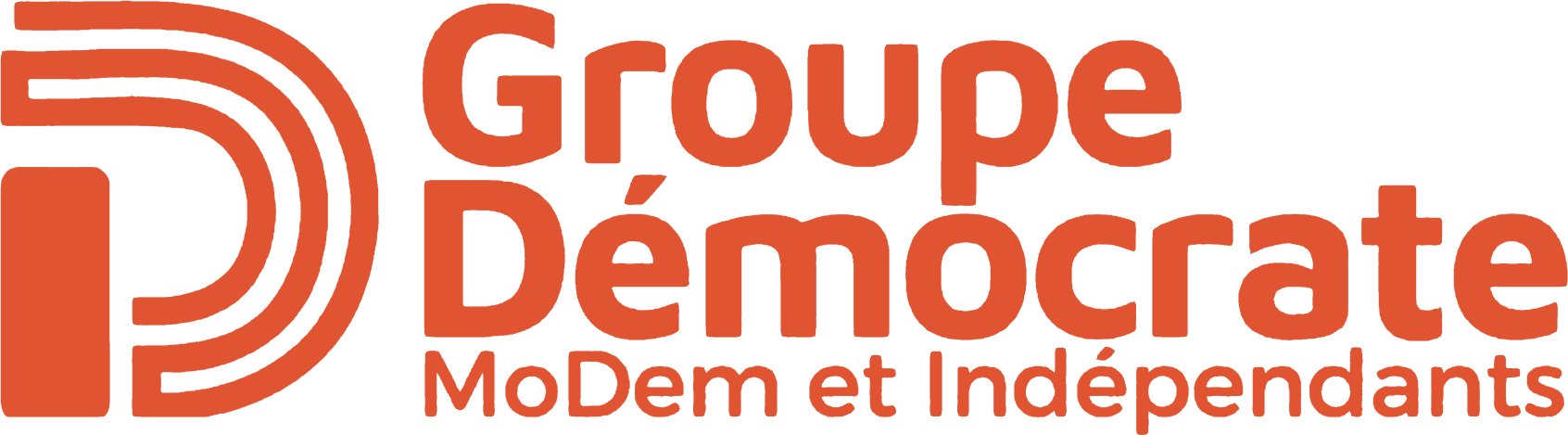
Previous group logo, in use until 2024

== List of presidents ==
Name	Term start	Term end	Constituency	Notes
Marc Fesneau	25 June 2017	17 October 2018	Loir-et-Cher's 1st	Resigned following his appointment to the government
Patrick Mignola	17 October 2018	21 June 2022	Savoie's 4th	Lost his seat in the 2022 legislative election
Jean-Paul Mattei	28 June 2022	9 June 2024	Pyrénées-Atlantiques's 2nd	
Marc Fesneau	18 July 2024		Loir-et-Cher's 1st	

== Historical membership ==
Year	Seats	Change	Notes
2017	47 / 577	▲47	
2022	48 / 577	▲1	
2024	36 / 577	▼12	

== See also ==
- Centrist Union group
