= Timeline of Nantes =

The following is a timeline of the history of the city of Nantes, France.

== Prior to 19th century ==
- After 276 CE - Construction of the Gallo-Roman wall of Nantes.
- 374 CE - Roman Catholic Diocese of Nantes established.
- 445 CE - Nantes besieged by Huns.
- 453 - Desiderius becomes Roman Catholic Bishop of Nantes.
- 548 - Félix of Nantes becomes Catholic bishop.
- 843-936 - The Normans held the town.
- 992 - Nantes taken by forces of the Duke of Brittany.
- 1118 - Fire.
- 1207 - Château des ducs de Bretagne constructed, a large castle in Nantes.
- 1434 - Nantes Cathedral construction begins.
- 1460 - University of Nantes founded.
- 1468 - Château des ducs de Bretagne rebuilt.
- 1493 - Printing press in operation.
- 1560 - Francis II of France grants Nantes a communal constitution.
- 1598 - Edict of Nantes, granting rights to Protestants, signed in the Château des ducs de Bretagne.
- 1606 - Hôtel de Ville completed.
- 1626 - Henry de Talleyrand punished for plotting against Cardinal Richelieu.
- 1640 - Nantes Stock Exchange established.
- 1685 - Revocation of Edict of Nantes by Louis XIV.
- 1720 - Street signs introduced.^{(fr)}
- 1753 - Bibliothèque municipale de Nantes (library) opens.
- 1788 - Théâtre Graslin inaugurated.
- 1790 - Nantes becomes part of the Loire-Inférieure souveraineté.
- 1793 - 29 June: Battle of Nantes.
- 1800 - Population: 77,162.

== 19th century ==
- 1803 - Chamber of Commerce established.
- 1806 - Municipal botanical garden established.
- 1808 - Lycée of Nantes inaugurated.
- 1815 - Palais de la Bourse (Nantes) built.
- 1817 - Slave trade officially banned.
- 1827 - Passage d'Orléans shopping arcade built.
- 1830 - Musée des Beaux-Arts de Nantes opens.
- 1832 - Duchess of Berry arrested for trying to stir up La Vendée against Louis Philippe I.
- 1843 - Passage Pommeraye shopping arcade built.
- 1846
  - Lefèvre-Utile biscuit company in business.
  - Notre-Dame de Bon-Port church built.
- 1848 - Labor unrest; crackdown.
- 1851 - Angers-Nantes railway begins operating.
- 1852 - Nantes Courthouse built.
- 1856 - Population: 108,530.
- 1858 - Nantes-Brest canal opens.
- 1869 - Basilique Saint-Nicolas de Nantes (church) built.
- 1875 - Natural History Museum of Nantes opens.
- 1876 - Population: 122,247.
- 1881 - Societe Nantaise de Photographie founded.
- 1891 - Nantes Cathedral construction completed.
- 1894 - Musée Dobrée left to the town.
- 1895 - La Cigale (brasserie) in business.
- 1900 - Ecole Supérieure de Commerce de Nantes established.

== 20th century ==
- 1903 - July: 1903 Tour de France passes through Nantes.
- 1906 - Population: 118,244 town; 133,247 commune.
- 1911 - Population: 170,535.
- 1937 - Stade Malakoff (stadium) opens.
- 1941 - Pont de la Rotonde (bridge) rebuilt.
- 1943
  - Bombing of Nantes.
  - Football Club de Nantes formed.
- 1946
  - Post-war rebuilding begins.
  - Population: 200,265.
- 1951 - Nantes Atlantique Airport begins commercial flights.
- 1955 - Unité d'Habitation of Nantes-Rezé (apartment building) constructed.
- 1965 - André Morice becomes mayor.
- 1966 - Pont Aristide-Briand (bridge) built.
- 1968 - Gare de Nantes (rail station) opens.
- 1971 - Orchestre National des Pays de la Loire established.
- 1973 - Palais des Sports de Beaulieu (arena) built.
- 1975 - Pont Anne-de-Bretagne (bridge) built.
- 1976 - Tour Bretagne built.
- 1977
  - Socialist Alain Chénard becomes mayor.
  - Socialist Party national congress held in Nantes.
- 1978 - Jules Verne Museum founded.
- 1979
  - Pont Haudaudine (bridge) built.
  - Three Continents Festival of film begins.
- 1980
  - Planetarium of Nantes established.
  - Sister city relationship established with Seattle, USA.
- 1982 - Nantes becomes part of the Pays de la Loire region.
- 1983 - Michel Chauty becomes mayor.
- 1984 - Stade de la Beaujoire (stadium) opens.
- 1985 - Nantes tramway begins operating.
- 1988 - École de design Nantes Atlantique and Théâtre de Poche Graslin established.
- 1989
  - Royal de Luxe marionette street theatre active.
  - Jean-Marc Ayrault becomes mayor.
- 1990 - École des mines de Nantes established.
- 1991
  - École centrale de Nantes active.
  - Les Anneaux de la Mémoire nonprofit headquartered in Nantes.
- 1992 - Nantes Events Center opens.
- 1995 - La Folle Journée music festival begins.
- 1998 - Théâtre du Cyclope established.
- 1999 - Population: 270,251.
- 2000 - Utopiales science fiction festival begins.

== 21st century ==
- 2001
  - Nantes.fr municipal website in operation.
  - Soy Festival of music begins.
- 2005 - Navibus (water bus) begins operating.
- 2006 - Nantes Busway begins operating.
- 2007
  - Machines of the Isle of Nantes exhibit opens.
  - Estuaire (biennale) art exhibit begins in Nantes vicinity.
- 2009 - Nantes Derby Girls (rollerderby league) formed.
- 2011 - Population: 287,845.
- 2014
  - March: Nantes municipal election, 2014 held.
  - Johanna Rolland becomes mayor.
  - 22 December: 2014 Nantes attack.
- 2015 - December: Pays de la Loire regional election, 2015 held.
- 2018- July 03- Police Officer shoots and kills 22 year old Aboubakar Fofana after he reverses his car towards another officer and 2 kids forcing one officer to shoot him in which the bullet hit him in the neck and hit an artery. The car was suspected of being used in drug dealing and Fofana had given police a false name prior to the shooting occurring. Following the shooting wide spread riots and protest occurred in the streets of Nantes.

== See also ==
- Nantes history
- History of Nantes
- List of mayors of Nantes
- Urban planning in Nantes
- History of Loire-Atlantique department
- History of Pays de la Loire region.

other cities in the Pays de la Loire region

- Timeline of Angers
- Timeline of Le Mans

== Bibliography ==
=== in English ===
- Heinrich August Ottokar Reichard (1816), "Nantes", An Itinerary of France and Belgium, London: Samuel Leigh
- "Nantes". Handbook for Travellers in France. London: John Murray. 1861.
- George Henry Townsend (1867), "Nantes", Manual of Dates (2nd ed.), London: Frederick Warne & Co.
- William Henry Overall, ed. (1870). "Nantes". Dictionary of Chronology. London: William Tegg. hdl:2027/uc2.ark:/13960/t9m32q949.
- "Nantes". Guide to the North of France. Edinburgh: Adam and Charles Black. 1876.
- John Ramsay McCulloch (1880), "Nantes", in Hugh G. Reid (ed.), A Dictionary, Practical, Theoretical and Historical of Commerce and Commercial Navigation, London: Longmans, Green, and Co.
- "Nantes". Northern France. Leipsic: Karl Baedeker. 1899. OCLC 2229516.
- "Nantes" . Encyclopædia Britannica. Vol. 19 (11th ed.). 1910. pp. 164–165.
- Georges Goyau (1911). "Nantes". Catholic Encyclopedia. New York: New York, The Encyclopedia Press.
- Trudy Ring, ed. (1995). "Nantes". Northern Europe. International Dictionary of Historic Places. Fitzroy Dearborn. ISBN 978-1-136-63944-9.
- Angela Fahy (2002). "Demographic change and social structure: the workers and the bourgeoisie in Nantes, 1830-1848". In Richard Lawton and W. Robert Lee (ed.). Population and Society in Western European Port Cities, c.1650-1939. Liverpool University Press. ISBN 978-0-85323-435-7.

=== in French ===
- Jacques Savary des Brûlons (1723). "Commerce de Nantes". Dictionnaire universel du commerce (in French). Paris: Jacques Estienne. hdl:2027/ien.35556004469227.
- "Nantes". De Paris à Nantes. Guides Joanne (in French). Paris. hdl:2027/nyp.33433003291436. circa 1856
- "Nantes". Basse-Loire. À la France: sites et monuments (in French). Paris: Touring-Club de France. 1901. OCLC 457600236.
