= Loire-Atlantique's 1st constituency =

Constituency of the National Assembly of France

1st constituency of Loire-Atlantique
- inline Constituency of the National Assembly of France

- Constituency in Department

- Location of Loire-Atlantique in France
- Deputy: Karim Benbrahim; PS
- Department: Loire-Atlantique
- Cantons: Nantes I, Nantes VI, Nantes VII, Orvault

The 1st constituency of Loire-Atlantique is a French legislative constituency in the Loire-Atlantique département, covering the western part of the city of Nantes. Like the other 576 French constituencies, it elects one MP using the two-round system, with a run-off if no candidate receives over 50% of the vote in the first round.

== Description ==
From 1958 to 1986, the constituency was made up of the cantons of Nantes-1, 2 and 3.

Deputy since 2007, Francois de Rugy, was also the President of the National Assembly between 2017 and 2018.

== Historic representation ==
Election	Member	Party	Notes
1988	Monique Papon	UDF	
1993	Monique Papon	UDF	
1997	Patrick Rimbert	PS	
2002	Jean-Pierre Le Ridant	UMP	
2007	François de Rugy	EELV	
2012	François de Rugy	EELV	
2017	François de Rugy	PÉ-LREM	
2018	Mounir Belhamiti	LREM	Substitute for François de Rugy, replaced him while he was Minister for the Ecological Transition, from 5 October 2018 to 16 August 2019
2019	François de Rugy	PÉ-LREM	
2022	Mounir Belhamiti	RE	
2024	Karim Benbrahim	PS	

== Election results ==
=== 2024 ===
Candidate	Party	Alliance	First round			Second round		
Candidate	Party	Alliance	Votes	%	+/–	Votes	%	+/–
Karim Benbrahim	PS	NFP	23,671	43.20	+6.23	24 963	46,16	-1.76
Mounir Belhamiti	REN	Ensemble	20,488	37.39	+5.91	20 610	26,75	-25.33
Bryan Pecqueur	RN		9,937	18.13	+11.74	8,501	10,99	new
Hélène Defrance	LO		521	0.95	+0.27			
Betty Collober	NPA		181	0.33	new			
Votes			54,798	100.00		54,074	100.00	
Valid votes			54,798	97.55	-0.85	54,074	98.08	+3.60
Blank votes			1,193	2.12	+0.76	910	1.65	-2.97
Null votes			181	0.32	+0.08	148	0.27	-0.63
Turnout			56,172	72.63	+17.94	55,132	71.28	+17.61
Abstentions			21,170	27.37	-17.94	22,213	28.72	-17.61
Registered voters			77,342			77,345		
Result			PS GAIN FROM LREM					

=== 2022 ===
Legislative Election 2022: Loire-Atlantique's 1st constituency
Party	Candidate	Votes	%	±%
PS (NUPÉS)	Karim Benbrahim	15,343	36.97	+13.05
LREM (Ensemble)	Mounir Belhamiti	13,067	31.48	-13.88
LR (UDC)	Anthony Beraud	5,212	12.56	−4.68
RN	Bryan Pecqueur	2,652	6.39	+1.96
REC	Carol Godon	1,984	4.78	N/A
DVE	Nicole Girel	1,852	4.46	N/A
Others	N/A	1,394	3.36	
Turnout		41,504	54.69	−1.16
2nd round result
LREM (Ensemble)	Mounir Belhamiti	20,367	52.08	-14.06
PS (NUPÉS)	Karim Benbrahim	18,739	47.92	N/A
Turnout		38,106	53.67	+10.52
LREM gain from PÉ				

=== 2017 ===
Candidate	Label	First round		Second round	
Candidate	Label	Votes	%	Votes	%
François de Rugy	PE	18,645	45.34	18,796	66.14
Julien Bainvel	LR	7,092	17.24	9,622	33.86
Sylvie Clabecq	FI	4,935	12.00		
Aymeric Seassau	PCF	2,980	7.25		
Jean-Michel Mézange	ECO	1,920	4.67		
Guylène Friard	FN	1,822	4.43		
Blandine Krysmann	DVD	828	2.01		
Margot Medkour	DVG	554	1.35		
Nicole Girel	ECO	450	1.09		
Hippolyte Le Routier	DLF	449	1.09		
Michel Beaupré	REG	345	0.84		
Sylvie Garcia	DIV	282	0.69		
Antoine Nivard	DVD	206	0.50		
Sarah Frison	DIV	196	0.48		
Philippe Renaud	REG	160	0.39		
Hélène Defrance	EXG	152	0.37		
Guillaume Brunet	DVG	111	0.27		
Votes		41,127	100.00	28,418	100.00
Valid votes		41,127	98.27	28,418	87.88
Blank votes		614	1.47	3,284	10.16
Null votes		111	0.27	636	1.97
Turnout		41,852	55.85	32,338	43.15
Abstentions		33,085	44.15	42,598	56.85
Registered voters		74,937		74,936	
Source: Ministry of the Interior

=== 2012 ===
2012 legislative election in Loire-Atlantique's 1st constituency
Candidate	Party	First round		Second round	
Candidate	Party	Votes	%	Votes	%
François de Rugy	EELV–PS	20,804	47.83%	23,916	58.94%
François Pinte	UMP	13,828	31.79%	16,659	41.06%
Guylène Friard	FN	2,667	6.13%		
Aymeric Seassau	FG	2,248	5.17%		
Hervé Grelard	NC dissident	1,060	2.44%		
Blandine Krysmann	PCD	774	1.78%		
Christine Meyer	MRC	670	1.54%		
Nicole Girel	??	529	1.22%		
Alexandre Eveno	PFE	374	0.86%		
Claudine Jegourel	NPA	293	0.67%		
Nicolas Bazille	LO	156	0.36%		
Chérine Sultan	SP	92	0.21%		
Valid votes		43,495	98.89%	40,575	97.73%
Spoilt and null votes		486	1.11%	943	2.27%
Votes cast / turnout		43,981	60.44%	41,518	57.05%
Abstentions		28,791	39.56%	31,254	42.95%
Registered voters		72,772	100.00%	72,772	100.00%

=== 2007 ===
Legislative Election 2007: Loire-Atlantique's 1st constituency
Party	Candidate	Votes	%	±%
UMP	Jean-Pierre Le Ridant	19,009	42.10	
LV	François de Rugy	15,800	34.99	
MoDem	Valérie Lorin	4,151	9.19	
Far left	Régis Boudaud	1,202	2.66	
Others	N/A	4,991		
Turnout		45,765	62.78	
2nd round result
LV	François de Rugy	23,029	52.03	
UMP	Jean-Pierre Le Ridant	21,231	47.97	
Turnout		45,039	61.78	
LV gain from UMP				

=== 2002 ===
Legislative Election 2002: Loire-Atlantique's 1st constituency
Party	Candidate	Votes	%	±%
UMP	Jean-Pierre Le Ridant	19,494	43.56	
PS	Patrick Rimbert	16,664	37.24	
FN	Lucie Blaie	2,435	5.44	
LV	François de Rugy	1,902	4.25	
Others	N/A	4,153		
Turnout		45,332	65.47	
2nd round result
UMP	Jean-Pierre Le Ridant	21,469	51.65	
PS	Patrick Rimbert	20,100	48.35	
Turnout		42,341	61.15	
UMP gain from PS				

=== 1997 ===
Legislative Election 1997: Loire-Atlantique's 1st constituency
Party	Candidate	Votes	%	±%
UDF	Monique Papon	15,176	35.91	
PS	Patrick Rimbert	14,019	33.17	
FN	Pierre Péraldi	4,009	9.49	
DVE	Jean-Claude Demaure	2,561	6.06	
PCF	Catherine Gravoille	2,561	6.06	
DVD	Patricia Rio	1,714	4.06	
GE	Jane Williamson	1,283	3.04	
Others	N/A	941		
Turnout		43,823	64.66	
2nd round result
PS	Patrick Rimbert	22,359	50.52	
UDF	Monique Papon	21,901	49.48	
Turnout		45,941	67.78	
PS gain from UDF				

== References and Sources ==
- Official results of French elections from 1998: "Résultats électoraux officiels en France" (in French). Archived from the original on 20 December 2011.
