= List of senators of Loire-Atlantique =

Location of Loire-Atlantique in France

Following is a list of senators of Loire-Atlantique, people who have represented the department of Loire-Atlantique in the Senate of France.

== Third Republic ==
Senators for Loire-Atlantique under the French Third Republic were:

- Alexandre de Lavrignais 1876–1886
- Henri Baillardel de Lareinty 1876–1901
- Henri Espivent de la Villesboisnet 1876–1897
- Adolphe Decroix 1886–1894
- Ernest Guibourd de Luzinais 1886–1899
- Charles Le Cour-Grandmaison 1895–1901
- Augustin Maillard 1897–1920
- Auguste Mercier 1900–1920
- Charles Etienne Gustave Leclerc de Juigné 1900
- Charles Édouard, comte de La Jaille 1901–1920
- Henri Le Cour-Grandmaison 1901–1916
- Fernand du Breil de Pontbriand 1901–1920
- Ambroise de Landemont 1920–1932
- Charles François-Saint-Maur 1920–1941
- Jean Babin-Chevaye 1920–1936
- Jules Léon Jamin 1920–1923
- Henri-Julien-Marie Busson-Billault 1920–1923
- Pierre de Montaigu 1920–1933
- Jules-Albert de Dion 1923–1941
- Louis Linÿer 1927–1941
- Gustave Gautherot 1932–1941
- Jacques Le Clerc de Juigné 1936–1941

== Fourth Republic ==
Senators for Loire-Atlantique under the French Fourth Republic were:

Term	Name
1946–1948	Georges Aguesse
1946–1948	Abel Durand
1946–1948	Corentin Le Contel
1948–1955	René Dubois
1948–1955	Abel Durand
1948–1955	Michel de Pontbriand
1948–1955	Pierre Fleury
1955–1959	Georges Aguesse
1955–1959	René Dubois
1955–1959	Abel Durand
1955–1959	Michel de Pontbriand

== Fifth Republic ==
Senators for Loire-Atlantique under the French Fifth Republic:

Term	Name	Group	Notes
1959–1965	Albert Boucher	Républicains et Indépendants	Died in office 2 March 1965
1959–1965	Paul Guillard	Union des Républicains et des Indépendants	From 3 March 1965 in place of Albert Boucher
1959–1965	Michel de Pontbriand	Union pour la Nouvelle République	
1959–1965	René Dubois	Républicains et Indépendants	
1959–1965	Abel Durand	Républicains et Indépendants	
1965–1974	Michel Chauty	Rassemblement pour la République	
1965–1974	Paul Guillard	Union des Républicains et des Indépendants	
1965–1974	Maurice Sambron	Républicains et Indépendants	Died in office 13 December 1973
1965–1974	Henri Fournis	Républicains et Indépendants	From 14 December 1973 in place of Maurice Sambron
1965–1974	André Morice	Gauche Démocratique	
1974–1983	Michel Chauty	Rassemblement pour la République	
1974–1983	Paul Guillard	Union des Républicains et des Indépendants	
1974–1983	Bernard Legrand	Rassemblement Démocratique et Européen	
1974–1983	André Morice	Gauche Démocratique	
1983–1992	François Autain	Communiste, Républicain, Citoyen et des Sénateurs du Parti de Gauche	
1983–1992	Michel Chauty	Rassemblement pour la République	
1983–1992	Charles-Henri de Cossé-Brissac	Républicains et Indépendants	
1983–1992	Luc Dejoie	Rassemblement pour la République	
1983–1992	Bernard Legrand	Rassemblement Démocratique et Européen	
1992–2001	François Autain	Communiste, Républicain, Citoyen et des Sénateurs du Parti de Gauche	
1992–2001	Charles-Henri de Cossé-Brissac	Républicains et Indépendants	
1992–2001	Luc Dejoie	Rassemblement pour la République	
1992–2001	Marie-Madeleine Dieulangard	Socialiste	
1992–2001	Guy Lemaire	Rassemblement pour la République	
2001–2011	François Autain	Communiste, Républicain, Citoyen et des Sénateurs du Parti de Gauche	
2001–2011	Charles Gautier	Socialiste	
2001–2011	Gisèle Gautier	Union pour un Mouvement Populaire	
2001–2011	Monique Papon	Union pour un Mouvement Populaire	
2001–2011	André Trillard	Les Républicains	
2011–2017	Ronan Dantec	Rassemblement Démocratique et Social Européen	
2011–2017	Joël Guerriau	Les Indépendants – République et Territoires	
2011–2017	Michelle Meunier	Socialiste et républicain	
2011–2017	André Trillard	Les Républicains	
2011–2017	Yannick Vaugrenard	Socialiste et républicain	
2017–2023	Ronan Dantec	Rassemblement Démocratique et Social Européen	
2017–2023	Joël Guerriau	Les Indépendants – République et Territoires	
2017–2023	Michelle Meunier	Socialiste et républicain	
2017–2023	Christophe Priou	Les Républicains	
2017–2023	Yannick Vaugrenard	Socialiste et républicain	

== Sources ==
- Liste des anciens sénateurs de la IIIème République par circonscription (in French), Sénat de France
- Liste des anciens sénateurs de la IVème République par circonscription (in French), Sénat de France
- Liste des anciens sénateurs de la Vème République par circonscription (in French), Sénat de France
- Liste par département – Loire-Atlantique (in French), Sénat de France
