= Lycée Georges Clemenceau (Nantes) =

Public secondary school in Nantes, France

Coordinates: 47.2189°N 1.5450°W

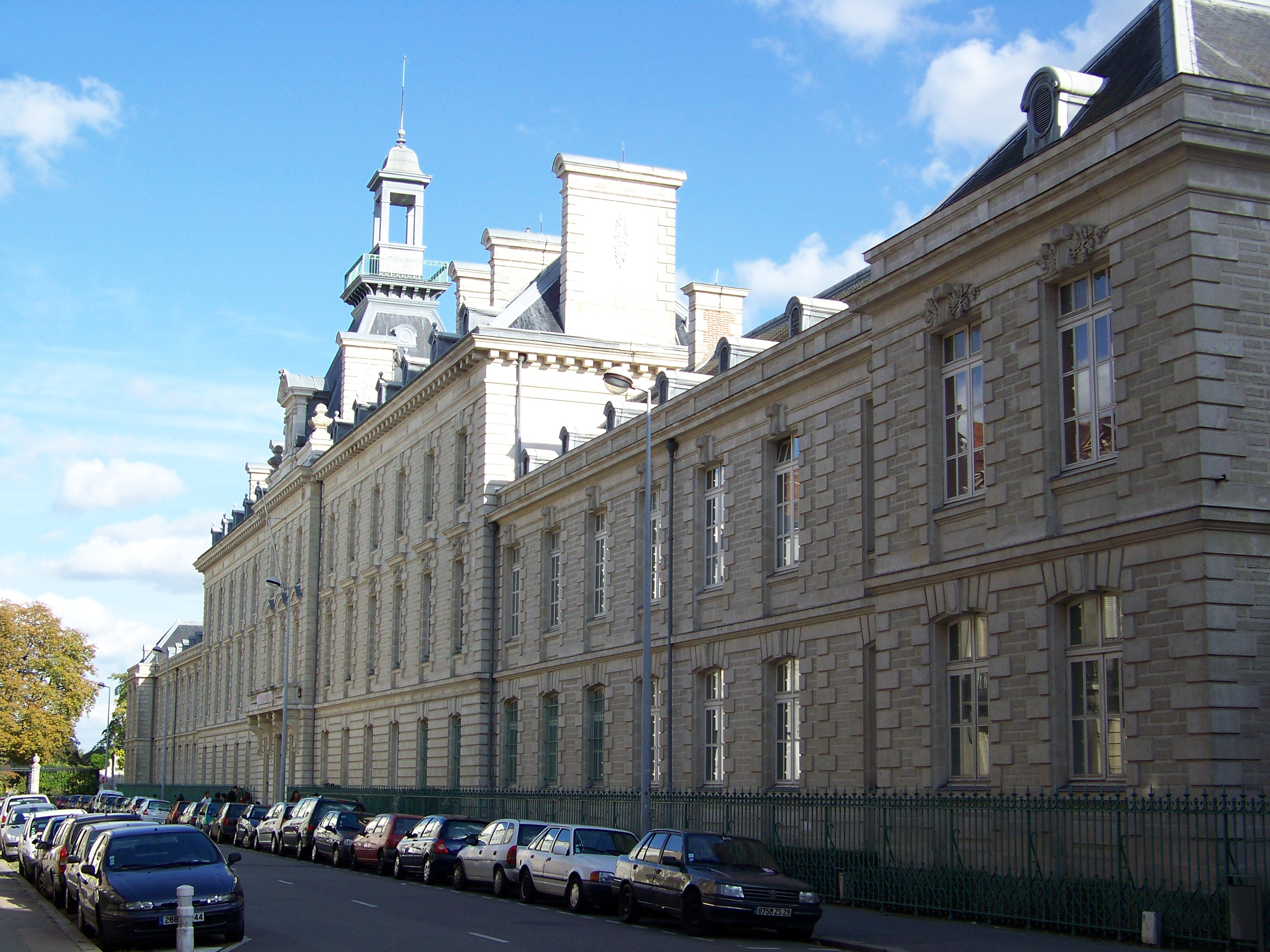
Lycée Georges Clemenceau

The Lycée Georges Clemenceau, French pronunciation: [lise ʒɔʁʒ klemɑ̃so], usually called Lycée Clemenceau is a public secondary school located in Nantes, France, formerly known as the Lycée of Nantes. Inaugurated in 1808, it is the oldest secondary school of the town of Nantes and in the department of Loire-Atlantique.

It offers both a sixth-form college curriculum (as a lycée), and a post-secondary-level curriculum (classes préparatoires).

It is located next to a botanic garden (Jardin des plantes).

The Emperor Napoleon visited the Lycée on 9 August 1808. The school was rebuilt from 1886 to 1892 to a design by the architects Antoine Demoget and Léon Lenoir. Notable alumni include the writer Jules Verne and the politician Georges Clemenceau for whom the school was renamed.

== Notable alumni ==
=== Writers ===
- Henri Anger (1907–1989), novelist
- Alphonse de Châteaubriant (1877-1951)
- Tristan Corbière (1845-1865, poet)
- Marc Elder (1884-1933)
- Julien Gracq (1910-2007)
- Morvan Lebesque (1911-1970, also journalist)
- Jean Sarment (1897-1976, also actor)
- Marcel Schwob (1867-1905)
- Jules Verne (1828-1905)
- Jacques Vaché (1895-1919)
- Jules Vallès (1832-1885)

=== Politicians ===
- François Autain, senator and Secretary of State
- Robert Badinter, lawyer, minister of Justice, president of the Constitutional Council
- Mehdi Bazargan, 46th Prime Minister of Iran (1979)
- Aristide Briand, minister, president of the Council (prime minister) and Nobel Peace Prize
- Georges Clemenceau, journalist, senator and president of the Council (prime minister)
- Henri Lopès, prime minister of the Republic of the Congo
- André Morice, minister, parliamentary and mayor of Nantes
- Abdollah Riazi, 16th Speaker of the Parliament of Iran (1963–1978)

=== Painters ===
- Maurice Chabas
- Paul Chabas
- Emile Laboureur
- Maxime Maufra
- Jean Metzinger
- James Tissot

=== Performing arts ===
- The brothers André and Georges Bellec (singers from the group les Frères Jacques)
- Yvan Dautin (singer)
- Jacques Garnier (dancer and choreographer)
- Thierry Fortineau (actor)
- Paul Ladmirault (composer)
- Yves Lecoq (actor)
- Jacques Legras (actor)
- Olivier Messiaen
- François Tusques (composer)
- Christine and the Queens (musician)

=== Architecture ===
- Pol Abraham (architect)

=== Military ===
- General Boulanger
- General Buat
- General Huntziger
- General Lamoricière
