= International reactions to the 2016 Turkish coup attempt =

International response to Turkey's 2016 failed coup

Many international leaders and governments responded to the 2016 Turkish coup d'état attempt. Financial markets reacted negatively.

== International response ==
=== Supranational bodies ===
- Council of Europe: Thorbjørn Jagland, Secretary General of the Council of Europe was the very first name who stood against the coup attempt during the first hours of the event. Unlike the other European leaders, he did not wait for the coup's failure to speak up. During the first hours of the coup plotters' moves of blocking İstanbul's bridges and flying fighter jets low over İstanbul and Ankara, Jagland tweeted against the coup attempt and underlined that 'any attempt to overthrow the democratically elected leaders is unacceptable'.
- European Union: Federica Mogherini, High Representative of the Union for Foreign Affairs and Security Policy, tweeted that she was "in constant contact" with the EU delegations in Ankara & Brussels, and called for "restraint and respect for democratic institutions." The next day, 2 statements were issued by the European Commission. One was by Federica Mogherini and the Commissioner for European Neighbourhood Policy and Enlargement Negotiations Johannes Hahn, and stated the condemnation of the attempted coup while stressing the need for "a swift return to Turkey's constitutional order". Another one was by the President of the European Commission Jean-Claude Juncker, the President of the European Council Donald Tusk and again Federica Mogherini, as well as on behalf of the member states of the European Union which were present at the 11th Asia–Europe Meeting. This statement expressed the support for the democratically elected Turkish government.
- NATO: Secretary-General Jens Stoltenberg issued a statement calling for calm and "full respect for Turkey’s democratic institutions and its constitution."
- United Nations: Secretary-General Ban Ki-moon issued a statement appealing for calm in Turkey. Spokesman Farhan Haq said the secretary-general was closely following developments.

=== States ===
- Albania: President Bujar Nishani said that he shows "full support for the constitutional order in Turkey" and also said that "Albanians are staying close to the friendly people of Turkey in these difficult hours. We hope for peace and legitimacy to return to our friend Turkey. Political stability and order in Turkey are very important. The only way of Turkey's stability and to the region's is that of democracy." The Prime Minister Edi Rama showed support for the government and has tweeted that he was "Happy for the brotherly people of Turkey and precious friend president Erdogan for getting out of a very tough night with full success."
- Australia: Prime Minister Malcolm Turnbull, after acknowledging the failure of the attempted coup, reiterated Australia's support for the democratically elected government of Turkey. The Department of Foreign Affairs and Trade warned Australians to stay off of the streets, to follow the instructions of authorities and to advise friends and family of their whereabouts. Foreign Minister Julie Bishop stated that the situation was fluid and that the government was in contact with the Ambassador and assisting in locating Australians in the country.
- Belgium: Professor of Ghent University and member of "Ghent Institute for International Studies", Dries Lesage, criticized the late responses of European and many western leaders and suggests that European leaders were opportunistically waiting to observe further developments, while the coup was filled with violence. He illustrated this by stressing that Prime minister Charles Michel only reacted shortly before midday. Prime minister Charles Michel and Minister of Foreign Affairs Didier Reynders (both of the party Mouvement Réformateur) condemned the coup d'état, but advocated for "respect for the rule of law and constitutional order" and "chariness". The mayor of Beringen (where attacks by Erdogan-supporters on the pro-Gülen movement "Vuslat" took place) said that it has been made clear that Erdogan will ask for the extradition of Gülen-supporters [without Belgium being specifically specified]. Nevertheless, by 18 July 2016, there had been no requests by the Turkish government to Belgium for the extradition of persons related to the coup d'état. A newspaper articles claimed that Belgian governments would not simply consent to each extradition request. The next day, Minister-President of Flanders Geert Bourgeois criticized a spokesman of the Turkish embassy in Brussels, who had condemned purported good relations between Bourgeois, Flemish authorities and Flemish organizations on the one hand and the Gülen movement on the other hand. Geert Bourgeois also denounced the dismissal of thousands of magistrates and teachers after the coup, stating that this is analogue to Nazi Germany and not worthy of a democracy and the rule of law.
- Bulgaria: President Rosen Plevneliev condemned all forms of violence and expressed support for the democratically elected institutions of Turkey. PM Boyko Borissov stated that the Bulgarian authorities are closely monitoring the situation in neighbouring Turkey.
- Canada: Foreign Minister Stéphane Dion tweeted that he was "concerned" and urged for "calm, order, [and] safety of Turkish citizens." Prime Minister Justin Trudeau released a statement calling for restraint by all parties, stating Canada supports the preservation of democracy in Turkey, and condemns any attempt to undermine its democratic institutions by "force of arms".
- China: The Ministry of Foreign Affairs called on Turkey to restore order and stability as soon as possible after a coup attempt.
- Costa Rica: The Ministry of Foreign Affairs and Worship announced that the Government of Costa Rica strongly condemned the coup d'état attempt to undermine its democratic institutions by armed forces, and wished for the re-establishment of the democratic constitutional order.
- Czech Republic: President Miloš Zeman said that "Turkey should avoid bloodshed and keep democratic principles as it is a member of NATO and a key player in the region." Prime Minister Bohuslav Sobotka noted that "democratic principles stressed by President Erdogan and the government during the night must be fulfilled in the future."
- Estonia: President Toomas Hendrik Ilves made a tweet condemning the coup, stating that "a military coup of a democratically elected government can never be accepted".
- France: The Minister of Foreign Affairs and International Development Jean-Marc Ayrault declared that France most strongly condemned the coup attempt. On 17 July 2016, the same Ayrault criticized the purge which was being actively executed by Recep Tayyip Erdoğan's government as a reaction to the attempted coup. On 20 July 2016, Erdoğan responded to Ayrault, claiming that Ayrault doesn't have authority to express anything about him. At the same time Erdoğan snapped at Ayrault, claiming he should occupy himself with his own matters.
- Georgia: Prime Minister Giorgi Kvirikashvili said that Georgia was following developments "with great concern," and that an emergency session of the National Security Council had met, which included President Giorgi Margvelashvili. Kvirakishvili also noted that the Georgian–Turkish border would be closed shortly, though no incidents had occurred near the border.
- Germany: Steffen Seibert, the German government's press secretary, tweeted that the democratic order of Turkey must be respected.
- Greece: PM Alexis Tsipras announced on Twitter that "the government and the people of Greece are staying by the side of democracy and constitutional legality."
- India – Ministry of External Affairs spokesperson Vikas Swarup tweeted that the ministry was closely watching developments, and advised Indians in Turkey to stay indoors. "We have been closely following the developments in Turkey. India calls upon all sides to support democracy and mandate of the ballot, and avoid bloodshed.”
- Iran: Foreign Minister Javad Zarif tweeted that he was "concerned" about the crisis in Turkey and that the "stability, democracy and safety of Turkish people are paramount" and urged for "unity and prudence order" between the Turkish people. President Hassan Rouhani was convening an emergency meeting of the Supreme National Security Council to discuss the situation in Turkey. He said later on 17 July that the era to stage coup d'état is gone, noting that problems can be resolved through "democracy" and "respect for votes of majority". "We are in a region where, unfortunately, some think can seize power by tank, plane and helicopter, and topple a government which has been elected by the people," Rouhani said while addressing people in Kermanshah, western Iran. An Iranian official pointed out parallels between the coup attempt in Turkey and the coup against Iranian Prime Minister Mohammad Mussadiq in 1953: “What we know is that this attempt was triggered by foreign hands. We have experienced the same thing in the past. Since Mr. Erdogan wants to play a more positive path in the region today, they want to overthrow him. (…) A message has been conveyed to the Turkish security authorities: Do not withdraw from the streets. This pulse may consist of several waves. That's what happened in Iran in 1953. When the first coup failed, the second was ready and he succeeded.”
- Ireland – Minister for Foreign Affairs Charles Flanagan made a statement calling for restraint and respect for democratic institutions in Turkey.
- Israel: The Foreign Ministry issued a statement following a failed coup in Turkey, stating that "Israel respects the democratic process in Turkey". It was also noted that "Israel expects that the process of reconciliation between the two countries will continue."
- Italy: Prime Minister Matteo Renzi expressed relief for the developments in Turkey; he also stated that "The concern for a situation out of control in a NATO partners, such as Turkey, gives way to the prevalence of stability and democratic institutions. We hope that there will not be setbacks and dangers for the population and for all the foreigners living in Turkey." He also added that he believed that "freedom and democracy are always the road to follow and defend".
- Lithuania: Minister of Foreign Affairs Linas Linkevičius tweeted that the coup "ruins foundation of sustainable democracy". The Ministry of Foreign Affairs issued a statement saying that they're highly concerned by the events in Turkey and asking all sides to secure the constitutional order and safety of civilians. They also reiterated Lithuania's support for the democratically elected Government of Turkey.
- Malaysia: Prime Minister Najib Razak condemned the coup, stressing that unconstitutional attempts to undermine legitimate government is unacceptable. "Democracy, and the will of the people, must always prevail". Najib also asked Malaysians in Turkey to remain calm and stay safe.
- Malta: Prime Minister Joseph Muscat condemned the coup, but stated that it should not result in an authoritarian crackdown.
- Moldova: President Nicolae Timofti condemned the coup attempt in Turkey and called for the constitutional order to be the main element of the existence of a law-governed state.
- Morocco: The Ministry of Foreign Affairs declared on 16 July that it was strongly concerned by constitutional order and stability in Turkey, and that it rejected any use of force for political change. The Prime Minister Abdelilah Benkirane, as Secretary General of PJD (Justice and Development Party), send a congratulation letter to Mr Erdogan.
- Netherlands: Minister for Foreign Affairs Bert Koenders strongly condemned the military actions against democratic institutions. He said his discussion with a Turkish colleague, about the rule of law, were important to continue. Further more, he stressed the need for the European Union to have a partner which respects human rights in the region with Syria.
- Pakistan: Prime Minister Nawaz Sharif strongly condemned the attempted military coup in Turkey. He added that Pakistan fully supports the Turkish president and his elected government. Tariq Fatemi, Special Assistant to Prime Minister on Foreign Affairs, telephoned the Turkish Foreign Minister to discuss the latest situation in Turkey. Pakistani Defense Minister Khawaja Asif tweeted saying that "Martial law... is no law" and also prayed for stability in Turkey and for the victory of democracy.
- Poland: President Andrzej Duda expressed his hope that the crisis be resolved as quickly as possible, seeing as he considers it crucial for peace and security in the Middle East, adding that "Let us bear in mind that Turkey plays a most important role as far as countering the migrant crisis goes, as well as stabilization in this part of the world and easening the tension arising from the Syrian conflict." Prime Minister Beata Szydło's official Twitter account posted a photo of her and German Chancellor Angela Merkel allegedly debating the crisis.
- Qatar: The Ministry of Foreign Affairs announced that "The State of Qatar has expressed its strong denunciation and condemnation of the military coup attempt, lawlessness, and violation of the constitutional legitimacy in the Republic of Turkey."
- Romania: President Klaus Iohannis expressed hope that "public order will be reinstated in the shortest time." Prime Minister Dacian Cioloș said the only way forward for Turkey was "a return to constitutional order and the rule of law."
- Russia: Foreign Minister Sergey Lavrov made a statement and said that it is important to "avoid bloodshed" in Turkey and that "any issues should be settled within a constitutional framework." President Vladimir Putin called Erdoğan out of solidarity before all NATO member countries’ heads following the coup attempt.
- Saudi Arabia: A Saudi foreign ministry official issued a statement welcoming the Turkish President's success in prevailing against the attempted coup. King Salman congratulated the Turkish President over the phone for the return to calm after the failed coup attempt. Saudi authorities detained, at the request of Ankara, the Turkish military attaché to Kuwait while flying through Dammam airport.
- Serbia: Prime Minister Aleksandar Vučić made a statement and said that Serbia wants Turkey to overcome the problems, to establish democratic order, peace and stability because that's important for Turkey, region of South-East Europe and Serbia."
- Somalia: The Ministry of Foreign Affairs in Somalia has tweeted that President Hassan Sheikh Mohamud condemns the attempted coup. It also tweeted that the President was "very glad to hear that evil forces who tried to turn Turkey into a violence ground have been defeated.’’ Somalia was one of the first countries to oppose the coup due to their close ties with Turkey and having received "close to one billion dollars' worth of aid, investment and infrastructure rebuilding since 2011". The Somali government ordered Gülen-linked organisations to close and gave Turkish citizens working for these a week to leave Somalia. This included Nile Academy, a Gülen-linked school.
- South Korea: On Saturday 16 July 2016, the Ministry of Foreign Affairs recommended its citizens to leave the country, and considered sending in a team to provide safety for stranded tourists at the Istanbul Atatürk Airport.
- Spain: – Prime Minister Mariano Rajoy announced over Twitter Spain's support for "the democratic constitutional order in Turkey, friend and ally".
- Sudan: President Omar al-Bashir condemned the attempted coup.
- Ukraine: Foreign Minister Pavlo Klimkin wrote on Twitter: "Now key priority for Turkey is respect for democratically elected institutions and saving people's lives." President Petro Poroshenko tweeted that he was "concerned" and that "Ukraine supports the democratically elected President and Government of Turkey".
- United Kingdom: Foreign Secretary Boris Johnson tweeted that he was "very concerned by events unfolding in Turkey," and that the British embassy was monitoring the situation closely. He advised British citizens to follow the Foreign and Commonwealth Office website for advice. Johnson subsequently followed this up with a statement urging "calm and the avoidance of any further bloodshed." He said he had spoken to Turkish foreign minister Mevlut Cavusoglu and had "underlined U.K. support for the democratic elected government and institutions."
- United States: Secretary of State John Kerry said he "hopes for stability, peace, continuity in Turkey." President Barack Obama said, "All parties in Turkey should support the democratically-elected Government of Turkey, show restraint, and avoid any violence or bloodshed." The United States Embassy in Ankara issued an Emergency Message, urging U.S. citizens in Turkey to "contact family and friends to let them know you are safe," also noting to "monitor local press for updates, avoid areas of conflict, and exercise caution if you are in the vicinity of any military or security forces." The United States State Department also prohibited U.S. airline carriers from flying to or from Turkey. The US Embassy in Turkey stated that the security at Istanbul's Atatürk airport is "significantly diminished" and The State Department advised U.S. citizens to reconsider travel to Turkey and also warned of threats of terrorism. The State Department stated on Twitter that "all parties in Turkey should support the democratically-elected Gov't of Turkey, show restraint, avoid violence."
- Venezuela: President Nicolás Maduro warned right wing against attempting a coup in his own country by stating that crackdown after the failed Turkish coup would be a child's play compared to how he would handle a similar attempt.

=== From unrecognized or partially recognized states ===
- Kosovo: President of Kosovo Hashim Thaçi tweeted that "The stability of Turkey is key to the whole region. In support of the democratically elected government and law and order in the country." Prime Minister Isa Mustafa wrote that "In these challenging moments for Turkey, strongly support the institutions that emerged from the votes and the will of the citizens of this friend country of Kosovo. In democratic societies the governing body is that which have received a mandate from the people. I hope as soon as possible that the situation in Turkey stabilizes and that there are no innocent victims."
- Gaza: The ruling Islamic militant group Hamas condemned the Turkish coup d'état attempt as a "vicious" plot to overthrow President Erdoğan.
- Northern Cyprus – Mustafa Akıncı, President of Northern Cyprus, said that commanders of Turkish troops deployed in the separatist Turkish Republic of Northern Cyprus remained loyal to Turkey's military command. He also said that undemocratic acts could never be the solution to Turkey's problems.
- Taiwan: The Ministry of Foreign Affairs advised its citizens in Turkey to pay special attention to safety and not to go near masses of people, and recommended not going to Turkey temporarily. Taiwanese airline EVA Air suspended flights to Turkey following the coup and announced that the airline would return operations in Summer 2017.

== Economy ==
Turkish coup attempt shook local markets. Istanbul's benchmark stock index, the BIST 100, fell 7.1% on the following Monday and was down another 1% on Tuesday, while lira-denominated bonds also lost value. The lira also plunged against other currencies after the coup attempt.
