= List of mayors of Nantes =

The office of the Mayor of Nantes is a directly elected position. Since 1947 there have been five mayors; the term of office is for a period of six years. The current mayor is Johanna Rolland (PS).

List of mayors
Period	Name	Party	Other position held
1565-1566	Geoffroy Drouet
1566-1568	Yves Rocas
1568-1569	Matthieu André
1569-1571	Pierre Cornulier
1571-1572	Jean Morin
1572-1573	Guillaume Harrouys
1573-1574	Michel Le Lou
1574-1575	Jacques Grignon
1575-1576	Jean Boutin
1576-1577	Robert Poullain
1577-1578	Michel Loriot
1578-1580	François Myron
1580-1581	Antoine de Brezenay
1581-1583	Bonaventure de Compluto
1583-1584	Claude Brossard
1584-1585	Antoine Gravoil
1585-1586	Jacques de Marquès
1586-1588	Jean Fruneau
1588-1590	Charles de Harouys
1590-1592	Pierre André
1592-1595	Jean Laubier
1595-1597	Guillaume Dubot
1597-1598	Jean Fourché
1598-1599	Charles de Harouys
1599-1601	Gabriel Hux
1601-1603	Julien Laurens
1603-1605	Yves Le Lou
1605-1607	Claude Cornulier
1607-1609	Michel Loriot
1609-1611	René Charette
1611-1613	Jean Blanchard
1613-1615	Louis Charette
1615-1617	Pierre Bernard
1617-1619	André Morin
1619-1621	Alexandre Charette
1621-1623	Jacques Raoul
1623-1625	Louis de Harouys
1625-1627	Jean de Harouys
1627-1629	René Ménardeau
1629-1631	René de la Tullaye
1631-1633	Guillaume Blanchard
1633-1634	René Bernard
1634-1636	André Jubot
1636-1637	René Charette
1637-1639	François Bourgogne
1639-1642	Pierre Poullain
1642-1644	Christophe Juchault
1644-1647	Yves Monti
1647-1648	Jacques de Bourges
1648-1650	Mathurin Boux
1650-1652	Jean Charette
1652-1654	Claude Bidé
1654-1657	Jean Fournier
1657-1659	René de Pontual
1659-1661	Jacques Huteau
1661-1662	Jean Poullain
1662-1664	Louis Macé
1664-1666	Mathurin Giraud
1666-1668	François Lorido
1668-1671	Jacques Charette
1671-1673	Gratien Libault
1673-1675	Jean Regnier
1675-1676	Louis Charette
1676-1679	Charles César Chevalier
1679-1682	Jacques Fremon
1682-1684	Louis Mesnard
1684-1685	Claude Bidé
1685-1688	Paul Cassard
1688-1690	Pierre Noblet
1690-1716	Julien Proust
1716-1720	André Boussineau
1720-1730	Gérard Mellier
1730-1732	René Le Ray
1732-1735	Jean François Vedier
1735-1736	René Darquistade
1736-1738	Claude Petit
1738-1740	François Moricaud
1740-1747	René Darquistade
1747-1748	François Pierre Durocher
1748-1754	Mathurin Bellabre
1754-1762	Jean-Baptiste Gellée de Prémion
1762-1766	Léonard Joubert
1766-1770	François Libault
1770-1772	Philippe-Vincent Royer
1772-1776	Pierre de la Ville de Chambardet
1776-1782	Jean-Baptiste Gellée de Prémion
1782-1786	Jean-Jacques Berrouette
1786-1787	Georges Guérin de Beaumont
1787-1789	Pierre Richard
1789-1791	Christophe-Clair Danyel de Kervégan
1791-1792	Pierre-Guillaume Giraud du Plessis
1792-1793	René Gaston Baco de la Chapelle
9 Oct 1793 - 6 Dec 1794	Jean-Louis Renard
12 Jan 1795 - 19 Nov 1795	Pierre-Guillume Giraud du Plessis
19 Nov 1795 - 3 May 1797	Gilbert Beaufranchet
4 May 1797 - 22 Sep 1797	Christophe-Clair Danyel de Kervégan
22 Sep 1797 - 25 Nov 1798	Julien-François Douillard
25 Nov 1798 - 19 Jul 1800	Louis-Maris Saget
19 Jul 1800 - 31 Mar 1801	François Fellonneau
2 Jun 1801 - 14 Jun 1803	Claude-Sylvain Paris
15 Jun 1803 - 17 Apr 1805	Augustin-Louis de Loynes
1805-1813	Jean-Baptiste Bertrand-Geslin
1813-1815	François-Maire de Fou
1815	Jean-Baptiste Bertrand-Geslin
1815	Maurice Etiennez
1815-1816	François-Marie du Fou
1816-1819	Louis Rousseau de Saint-Aignan
1819-1830	Louis-Hyacinthe Lévesque
1830	Maurice Etiennez
1830-1832	Philippe-René Soubzmain
1832-1848	Ferdinand Favre
1848-1852	Evariste Colombel
1852-1866	Ferdinand Favre
1866-1870	Antoine Dufour
1870-1871	René Waldeck-Rousseau
1871-1872	Arsène Leloup
1872-1874	René Waldeck-Rousseau
1874-1881	Julien Charles Marie Claudius Lechat
1881	Mathurin Brissonneau (interim)
1881-1885	Georges Évariste Eugène Colombel
1885-1888	Édouard Normand
1888-1892	Ernest François James Guibourd de Luzinais
1892-1896	Alfred Joseph Riom
1896-1899	Hippolyte Étienne Étiennez
1899-1908	Paul-Émile Sarradin
1908	Joseph Canal (interim)
17 May 1908 - 16 Dec 1910	Gabriel Guist'hau	ARD
16 Dec 1910 - 2 May 1928	Paul Bellamy	PRS
2 May 1928 - 1 Jun 1928	Gaston Veil	SFIO
1928-1929	Adolphe Moitié
1929-1935	Léopold Cassegrain	Radical Party
1935-1940	Auguste Pageot	SFIO
24 Dec 1940 - 4 May 1941	Edmond Prieur	SFIO
4 May 1941 - 10 Oct 1942	Gaëtan Rondeau
10 Oct 1942 - 31 Aug 1944	Henry Orrion	CNIP
31 Aug 1944 - 19 May 1945	Clovis Constant	SFIO
19 May 1945 - 31 Oct 1947	Jean Philippot (homme politique)	SFIO in 1933-1935
31 Oct 1947 - 26 Mar 1965	Henry Orrion	RPF
1965-1977	André Morice	CR	Senator
1977-1983	Alain Chénard	PS	Deputy
1983-1989	Michel Chauty	RPR	Senator
20 Mar 1989-21 Jun 2012	Jean-Marc Ayrault	PS	Deputy
21 Jun 2012-04 Apr 2014	Patrick Rimbert	PS	Deputy
04 Apr 2014-	Johanna Rolland	PS

== See also ==
- Timeline of Nantes
- Cornulier family
