= Ferdinand Favre =

French industrialist and politician (1779–1867)

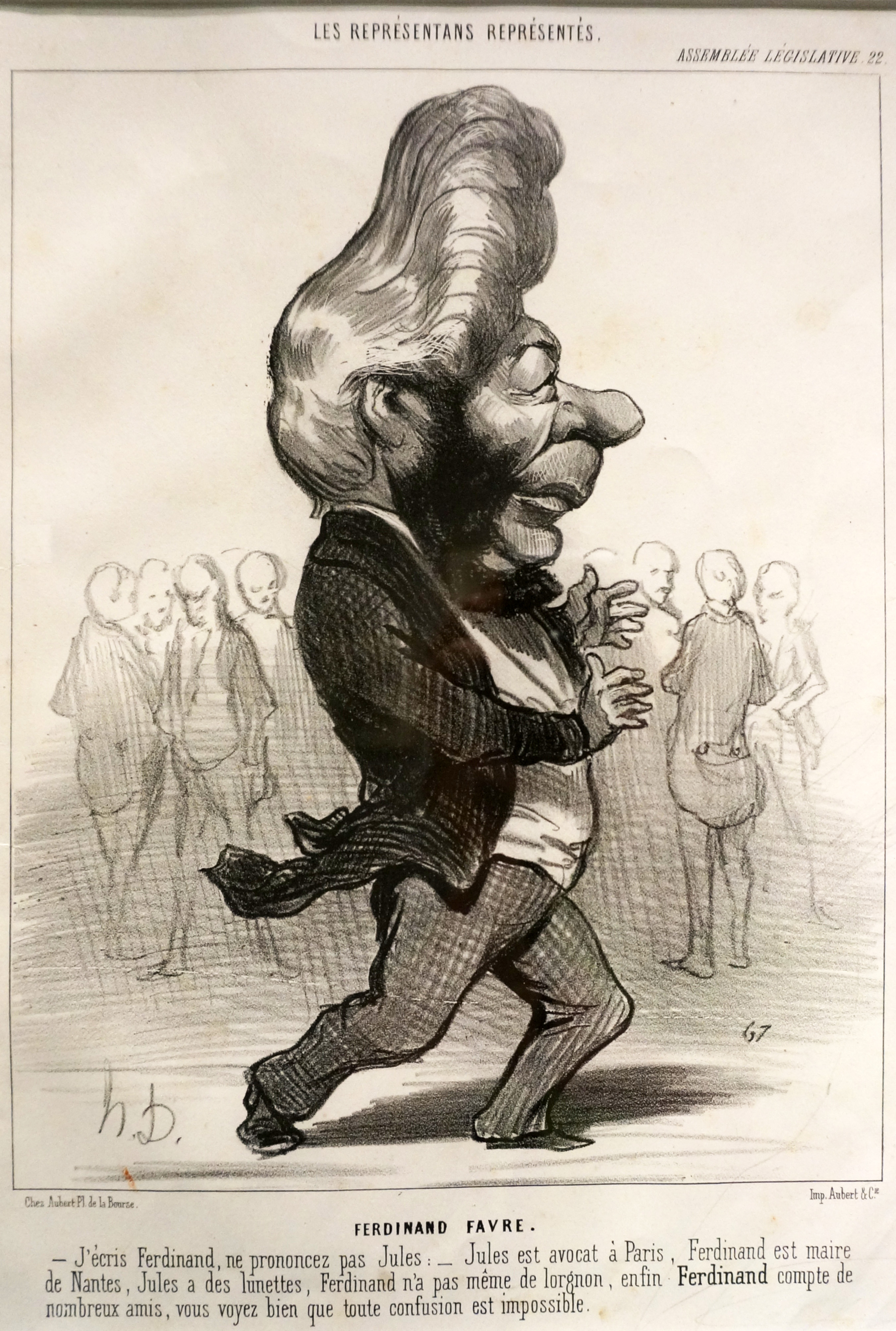
- Caricature of Ferdinand Favre
- Born: 22 February 1779; Couvet, Principality of Neuchâtel
- Died: 16 July 1867 (aged 88); 1st arrondissement, Paris, France
- Resting place: Petitpierre-Favre cemetery, Clos sur l’Eau, Saint-Sébastien-sur-Loire
- Occupations: Industrialist, politician
- Known for: Mayor of Nantes (1832–1848, 1852–1866), Deputy (1848–1857), Senator of the Second Empire (1857–1867)
- Parent(s): Antoine Favre (father), Marguerite-Henriette Petitpierre (mother)
- Relatives: Abraham Favre (brother), Charles Favre (brother), Rose-Marguerite Favre (sister)

Mayor of Nantes
- In office 15 February 1832 – 21 March 1848
- Preceded by: Philippe-René Soubzmain
- Succeeded by: Évariste Colombel

Mayor of Nantes
- In office 31 January 1852 – 19 January 1866
- Preceded by: Évariste Colombel
- Succeeded by: Antoine Dufour

Deputy of Loire-Inférieure
- In office 23 April 1848 – 1857

Senator of the Second Empire
- In office 20 June 1857 – 16 July 1867

Ferdinand Abraham Favre (22 February 1779 – 16 July 1867) was a French industrialist and politician of the 19th century. He served as Mayor of Nantes from 1832 to 1848 and again from 1852 to 1866, with an interruption during the Second French Republic. He was also a deputy of Loire-Inférieure (1848–1857) and a senator during the Second French Empire (1857–1867).

Favre should not be confused (Note: Until 17 January 2011, errors in sources conflated Favre with his uncle and brother-in-law, Ferdinand Petitpierre, particularly regarding involvement in the War in the Vendée and ownership of the Clos sur l'Eau estate.) with his uncle and brother-in-law, Ferdinand Petitpierre, who also moved from Couvet to Nantes in the late 18th century.

Favre was deeply involved in Nantes' illegal slave trade during the Bourbon Restoration. In 1824, he openly advertised in the Étrennes royales de Nantes his supply of goods for the slave trade. (Note: Favre was the consignee of a suspected illegal slave-trading expedition in 1824. Commanded by Robert Charles Scheult and outfitted by Edmond Villaume, the ship Bluette sailed to Santiago de Cuba. Another expedition, the Arthur, commanded by Captain John Williams of Charleston and outfitted by Pierre-Thomas Dennis, departed Nantes on 27 May 1825 for the African coast with 22 sailors. It embarked 183 captives, landing 160 in Santiago de Cuba. On its return, the ship carried 106 hogsheads of sugar and 80 sacks of coffee for Ferdinand Favre & Cie.)

== Biography ==
=== Family background and early life ===
The Favre family of Couvet, originally from Besançon, were Protestants who sought refuge in Switzerland around 1670 due to religious persecution preceding the Revocation of the Edict of Nantes. Ferdinand was the son of Antoine Favre, an artisan, and Marguerite-Henriette Petitpierre, daughter of another Couvet artisan.

In 1793, during the French Revolution, Ferdinand and his parents moved to Nantes, where his older siblings—Abraham, Charles, and Rose-Marguerite—had already settled. Rose-Marguerite was married to Ferdinand Petitpierre (1746–1803), a fellow Swiss from Couvet and a wealthy manufacturer of printed cotton fabrics (Société Petitpierre Frères et Compagnie). Petitpierre, a supporter of the Revolution and the Republic, served as a militia captain in 1789 and helped defend Nantes against the Vendéans in 1793.

The Favre and Petitpierre families were closely intertwined. Rose-Marguerite Favre, Ferdinand Petitpierre’s wife, was also his niece, as Marguerite-Henriette was Ferdinand Petitpierre’s sister. Since 1785, Petitpierre employed Abraham and Charles Favre in his business.

In 1799, Petitpierre retired, entrusting the company’s management to Abraham Favre under a lease to protect his children’s interests. In 1801, Petitpierre purchased the Clos sur l’Eau estate in Saint-Sébastien-sur-Loire. He died in 1803 and was buried on the estate, a common Protestant practice. Rose-Marguerite appointed Ferdinand Favre, her preferred brother, as guardian of her children, bypassing Abraham. When Abraham’s lease ended in 1806, he was replaced by Petitpierre’s sons, Ferdinand II and Aristide, under Ferdinand Favre’s guardianship. Abraham then founded his own company, “Favre-Petitpierre,” on the Île de Petite Biesse. The Clos sur l’Eau estate remained with Rose-Marguerite and later passed to her fourth son, Fleurus Petitpierre (1796–1859).

=== Business career ===
By 1806, the Petitpierre company, once thriving in 1785, had declined, as had Nantes’ broader calico industry from 1785 to 1800. Ferdinand Favre failed to revive the company, which went bankrupt in 1818, though the Petitpierre family’s wealth remained intact. In contrast, Abraham’s enterprise prospered until 1848.

Ferdinand pursued his own ventures in trade, ship outfitting, and industry, including coffee roasting and sugar refining. His commercial activities included involvement in Nantes’ illegal slave trade. In 1822, he began producing fertilizer from sugar refinery byproducts, known as “animal black,” which proved highly effective. By 1840, Nantes held a virtual monopoly on this product in Europe due to strong agricultural demand.

=== Political career ===
Ferdinand Favre joined the National Guard as an officer in 1814. His political activity was limited during the Bourbon Restoration.

==== Mayor of Nantes under the July Monarchy ====
A supporter of King Louis-Philippe, Favre served on the Loire-Inférieure general council and was appointed Mayor of Nantes by royal ordinance on 9 February 1832, succeeding Philippe-René Soubzmain. Installed on 15 February, he worked with new deputy mayors, including Mathurin Chéguillaume (merchant), François Le Sant (pharmacist and father-in-law of Ange Guépin), Thomas Chéguillaume (leather industrialist), Louis Vallet (spinner), and François Polo (cloth merchant). In the municipal council election, Favre ranked 14th with 59 votes, behind Soubzmain (90 votes) and others like Camille Mellinet (77 votes) and Adolphe Billault.

In 1832, Favre contributed to the arrest of the Duchess of Berry. His mayoral term was renewed in 1834, 1837, 1840, 1843, and 1846. In 1843, he topped the council election with 137 votes. Notable council members included Mathurin Peccot (1837, 1840), Saint-Félix Seheult (1840, 1843), Évariste Colombel (1843, resigned 1844), and Ange Guépin and Victor Mangin (1846).

==== Second Republic ====
During the French Revolution of 1848, Favre, favoring a regency, was dismissed as mayor on 21 March 1848 by government commissioner Jacques-Hippolyte Maunoury, who appointed Évariste Colombel. However, Favre was elected a deputy to the Constituent Assembly on 23 April 1848 and re-elected to the Legislative Assembly on 13 May 1849.

==== Second Empire ====
Following Louis-Napoléon Bonaparte’s coup d’état, Favre was appointed mayor again on 30 December 1851, thanks to Maurice Duval, a former Loire-Inférieure prefect. He was reinstalled on 31 January 1852 and re-elected in 1852, 1855, and 1860. He also became president of the Loire-Atlantique General Council on 7 August 1852 and served as a senator from 1857 to 1867.

Early in the Second Empire, Favre sought to make Nantes an imperial residence, proposing the purchase of the Château de l’Abbaye in Chantenay in 1853 and a residence for the imperial prince in 1856. Both proposals were declined.

In the July 1865 municipal elections, his list was defeated by the liberal opposition, including Ange Guépin and René Waldeck-Rousseau. Favre served as interim mayor until 19 January 1866, when he was succeeded by Antoine Dufour.

=== Botanist ===
As mayor, Favre played a key role in establishing the Jardin des Plantes de Nantes. An avid botanist, he dedicated years to acclimatizing the camellia.

At his death, he was buried in the Petitpierre-Favre cemetery at Clos sur l’Eau, (Note: The Clos sur l’Eau residence was demolished in 1971, but the cemetery remains and is open to the public during the European Heritage Days.) alongside most family members, except Abraham Favre, whose grave is in the Protestant section of Miséricorde Cemetery in Nantes.

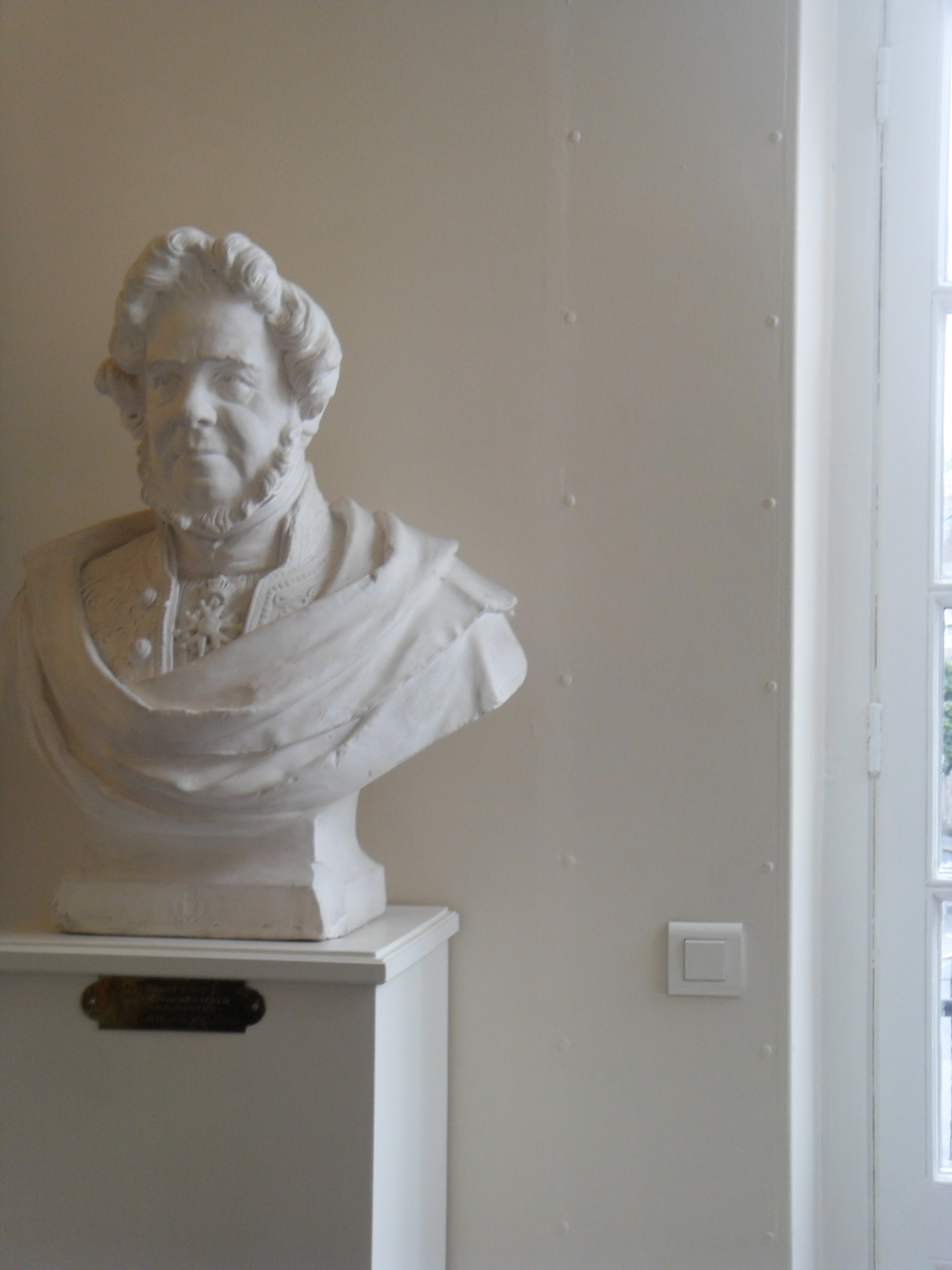
Bust of Ferdinand Favre at Nantes City Hall

== Honours ==
- Officer of Public Instruction
- Grand Officer of the Legion of Honour
- Commander of the Order of Isabella the Catholic

== Legacy ==
- Quai Ferdinand-Favre in Nantes, along the Canal Saint-Félix, near the Lieu Unique.

== See also ==
- History of Nantes
- Atlantic slave trade
- Second French Empire
- July Monarchy
- Jardin des Plantes de Nantes
- French Revolution
- Bourbon Restoration
- List of mayors of Nantes
- List of senators of Loire-Atlantique

== Bibliography ==
- Perthuis, Alexandre; de La Nicollière-Teijeiro, Stéphane (1873). Le Livre doré de l'hôtel-de-ville de Nantes [The Golden Book of Nantes City Hall] (in French). Vol. II. Nantes: Imprimerie Grinsard.
- Kahn, Claude; Landais, Jean (1992). Nantes et les Nantais sous le Second Empire [Nantes and Its People under the Second Empire] (in French). Nantes: Ouest éditions et Université inter-âges de Nantes. p. 281. ISBN 9782908261929.
- Gaillard, Alain (2010). "Les Petitpierre, indienneurs à Nantes" [The Petitpierres, Calico Printers in Nantes]. Amis de Saint-Sébastien (in French). Saint-Sébastien-sur-Loire.
- "Biographie" [Biography] (PDF). Dictionnaire des députés (1789-1889) (in French).
