= Mounir Belhamiti =

French politician (born 1985)

Member of the National Assembly for Loire-Atlantique's 1st constituency
- In office 22 June 2022 – 9 June 2024
- Preceded by: François de Rugy
- Succeeded by: Karim Benbrahim
- In office 5 October 2018 – 16 August 2019
- Preceded by: François de Rugy
- Succeeded by: François de Rugy

Member of the Municipal council of Nantes
- Incumbent
- Assumed office 4 April 2014
- Mayor: Johanna Rolland

Personal details
- Born: 8 March 1985 (age 41) Nantes, France
- Party: Renaissance
- Education: ESEO
- Profession: Engineer

Mounir Belhamiti (born 8 March 1985) is a French politician of La République En Marche! (LREM) who has been a member of the National Assembly from 2018 to 2019 and again since 2022, representing Loire-Atlantique's 1st constituency. He was reelected and succeeded to François de Rugy in 2022.

== Early life and education ==
Belhamiti is Digital Project Manager Engineer.

== Political career ==
=== Career in local politics ===
In the municipal elections of 2014, Belhamiti was elected councilor of Nantes on the list led by the socialist Johanna Rolland. In April 2018, with two other municipal councilors from Nantes, he left the group ecologist and citizen to form the group "Les écologistes en marche".

=== Member of the National Assembly ===
Replacing François de Rugy, Belhamiti became a member of the National Assembly for Loire-Atlantique's 1st constituency, following de Rugy's appointment to the government on September 4, 2018.

In the National Assembly, Belhamiti serves on the Defence Committee. He is also a member of several working groups on digital (Cybersecurity and Digital Sovereignty; Participatory Democracy and e-democracy; Digital economy of data, Knowledge and Artificial intelligence; Internet and Digital society).

In addition to his committee assignments, Belhamiti has been a member of the French delegation to the Franco-German Parliamentary Assembly since 2022.

== Other activities ==
- Institute of Advanced Studies in National Defence (IHEDN), Member of the Board of Directors

== See also ==
- 2017 French legislative election
