= Timeline of Le Mans =

The following is a timeline of the history of the city of Le Mans, France.

== Prior to 18th century ==
- 3rd C. – Wall built around Vindunum.
- 4th C. - Julian of Le Mans becomes bishop.
- 5th C. – Roman Catholic Diocese of Le Mans established.
- 6th C. – Le Mans Cathedral rebuilding begins.
- 832 – Aldric of Le Mans becomes bishop.
- 1063 – William the Conqueror in power.
- 1120 – Le Mans Cathedral consecrated.
- 1133 – 5 March: Birth of Henry (later king of England).
- 1189 – Philip II of France in power.
- 1508 – Maine customary laws published.
- 1558 – Hôtel de Vignolles built.
- 1562 – Le Mans sacked by Huguenots.

== 18th–19th centuries ==
- 1756 – Hôtel de Ville (City Hall) built.
- 1760 – Prefecture built.
- 1790 – Le Mans becomes part of the Sarthe souveraineté.
- 1793
  - December: Battle of Le Mans (1793).
  - Population: 18,855.
- 1799 – Royalist Chouans take Le Mans.
- 1812 – Nouvelliste de la Sarthe newspaper begins publication.
- 1854 – Gare du Mans (rail station) opens.
- 1856 – Le Mans Chamber of Commerce established.
- 1857 - Notre Dame de Sainte Croix completed.
- 1866 – Population: 45,230.
- 1868 – La Sarthe newspaper begins publication.
- 1871 – January: Battle of Le Mans; Germans win.
- 1873 – Comptoir d'Escompte de la Sarthe (bank) established.
- 1875 – Société historique et archéologique du Maine founded.
- 1880 – Société philotechnique du Maine active.
- 1886 – Petit Manceau newspaper begins publication.
- 1888 – Gare du Mans-les-Halles (rail station) opens.

== 20th century ==
- 1906
  - Automobile Club de l'Ouest founded.
  - Population: 54,907.
- 1908 – August: Wright brothers demonstrate flying machine.
- 1911 – Population: 69,361.
- 1923– First edition of the 24 Hours of Le Mans auto race.
- 1936 – Population: 84,525.
- 1940 – 19 June: German forces take city, during the Battle of France.
- 1944
  - 8 August: Germans ousted by Allied forces, during the Battle of Normandy.
  - Le Maine Libre newspaper begins publication.
- 1946 – Population: 100,455.
- 1947 – Jean-Yves Chapalain becomes mayor.
- 1965 – Jacques Maury becomes mayor.
- 1967
  - Cantons Centre, Est, Nord, Nord-Ouest, Sud, and Sud-Ouest created.
  - Le Mans twinned with Paderborn, Germany.
- 1974 – Le Mans twinned with Bolton, England, United Kingdom.
- 1977
  - Le Mans University opens.
  - Robert Jarry becomes mayor.
- 1981 – Le Mans twinned with Rostov-on-Don, Russia.
- 1982
  - Le Mans becomes part of the Pays de la Loire region.
  - Le Mans twinned with Haouza, Western Sahara.
- 1983 – Le Mans twinned with Volos, Greece.
- 1985 Le Mans FC founded.
- 1988 – Médiathèque Louis-Aragon du Mans opens in the Quartier des Halles (Le Mans).
- 1989 – Palais des congrès et de la culture du Mans opens.
- 1990 – Le Mans twinned with Suzuka, Japan.
- 1995 – Antarès arena and Musée Vert (museum) open.
- 1999 – Population: 146,105.

== 21st century ==
- 2001
  - Cityglace ice rink opens.
  - Jean-Claude Boulard becomes mayor.
- 2002 – Le Mans fait son cirque (circus) begins.
- 2005 – November: Socialist Party national congress held in Le Mans.
- 2006 – 9 March: Sablé-sur-Sarthe hostage crisis occurs near Le Mans.
- 2007 – Le Mans tramway begins operating.
- 2010 – Roman-era religious site discovered in nearby Neuville-sur-Sarthe.
- 2011 – Population: 143,240.
- 2014 – March: Le Mans municipal election, 2014 held.
- 2015 – December: Pays de la Loire regional election, 2015 held.

== See also ==
- Le Mans history
- History of Le Mans
- List of mayors of Le Mans
- List of heritage sites in Le Mans
- List of bishops of Le Mans
- County of Maine history
- List of Counts and dukes of Maine, 8th–18th c., centered in Le Mans

other cities in the Pays de la Loire region

- Timeline of Angers
- Timeline of Nantes

== Bibliography ==
=== in English ===
- "Mans". Chambers's Encyclopaedia. London. 1901. hdl:2027/njp.32101065312926.
- "Le Mans", Northern France (4th ed.), Leipzig: Karl Baedeker, 1905, hdl:2027/mdp.39015063869328, OCLC 01820283
- "Le Mans" . Encyclopædia Britannica. Vol. 16 (11th ed.). 1910. pp. 408–409.
- Georges Goyau (1910). "Le Mans". Catholic Encyclopedia. New York.
- Jean Caswell; Ivan Sipkov (1977). "Maine". Coutumes of France in the Library of Congress: an Annotated Bibliography. USA: Library of Congress. hdl:2027/mdp.39015034753866. ISBN 978-0-8444-0232-1.
- Trudy Ring, ed. (1995). "Le Mans". Northern Europe. International Dictionary of Historic Places. Fitzroy Dearborn. p. 403. ISBN 978-1-136-63944-9.
- Colum Hourihane, ed. (2012). "Le Mans". Grove Encyclopedia of Medieval Art and Architecture. Oxford University Press. ISBN 978-0-19-539536-5.

=== in French ===
- Léon Hublin (1884). Le Mans pittoresque (in French). Le Mans: E. Lebrault.
- Le Mans, Guides Joanne (in French), Hachette, 1888
- "Mans". Dictionnaire Bouillet (in French) (34th ed.). Hachette. 1914. hdl:2027/mdp.39015074817142.
