= Michelle Meunier =

French politician

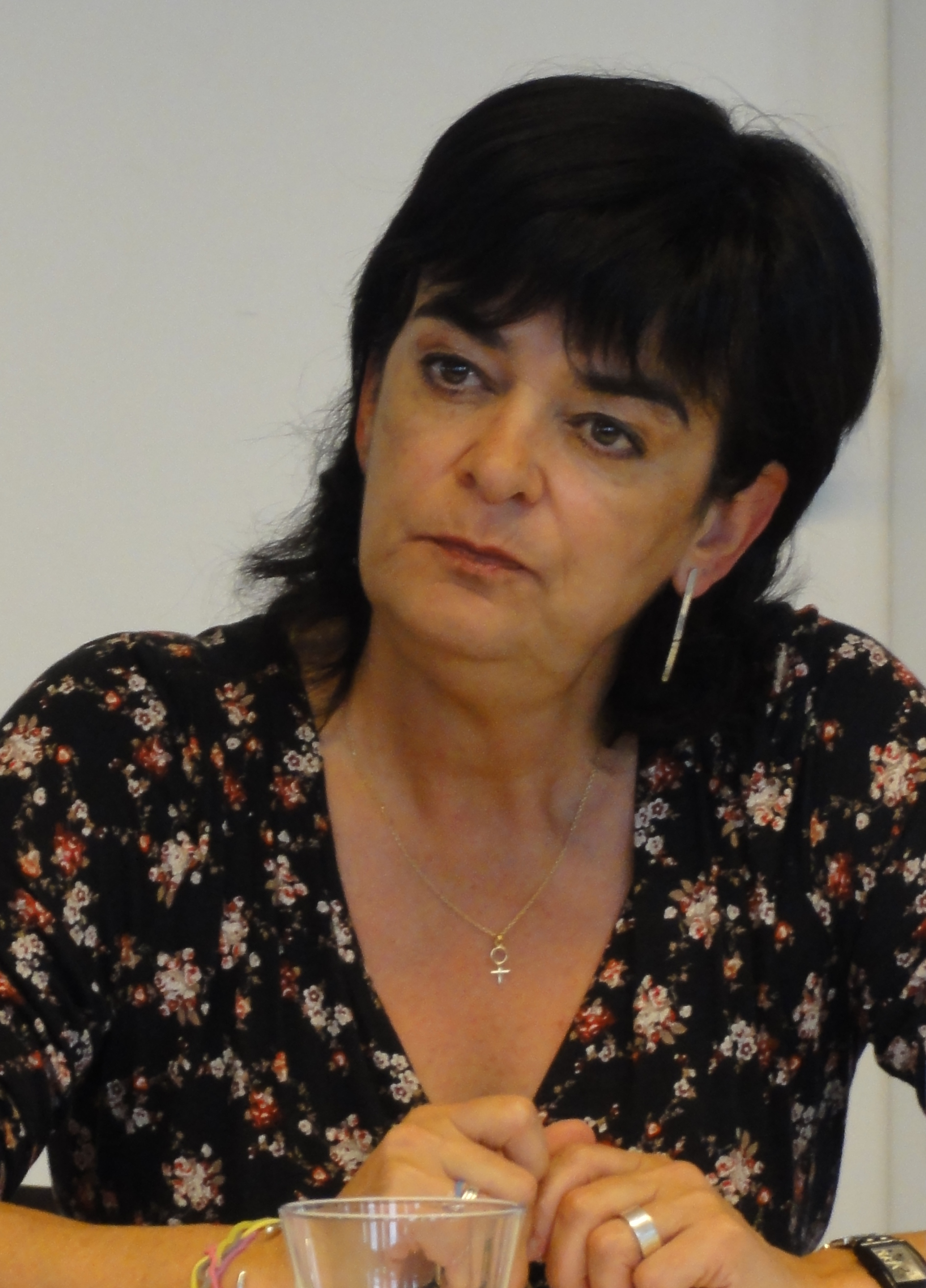
- Meunier in 2011.

Member of the French Senate for Loire-Atlantique
- Incumbent
- Assumed office 1 October 2011

Personal details
- Born: 24 January 1956 (age 70) France
- Party: Socialist Party

Michelle Meunier (born 24 January 1956) is a French politician who has been a member of the French Senate since 2011.

In 2023, Meunier publicly endorsed the re-election of the Socialist Party's chairman Olivier Faure.

== See also ==
- List of senators of Loire-Atlantique
- Women in the French Senate
