= François de Rugy =

French politician (born 1973)

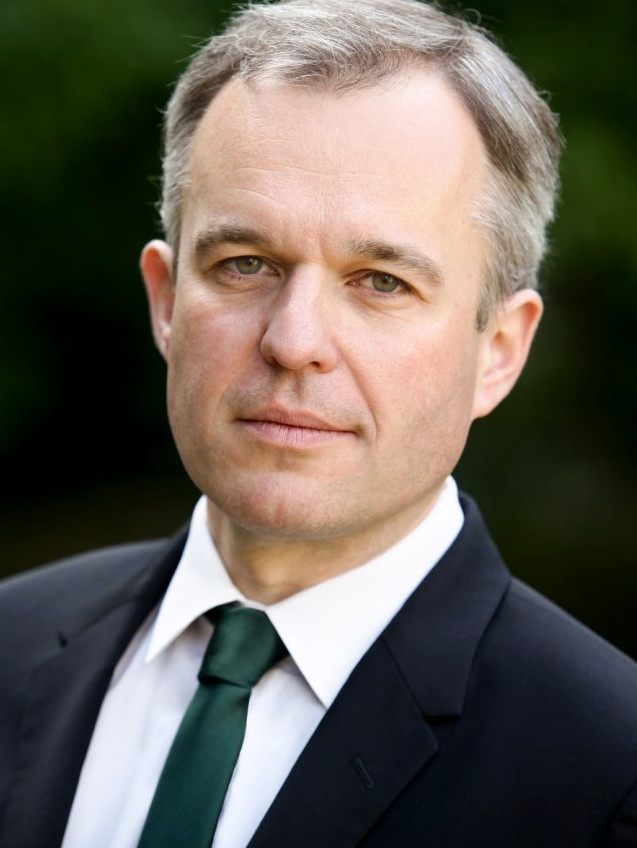
- De Rugy in 2017

Minister of State, Minister of Ecological and Solidary Transition
- In office 4 September 2018 – 16 July 2019
- Prime Minister: Édouard Philippe
- Preceded by: Nicolas Hulot
- Succeeded by: Élisabeth Borne

President of the National Assembly
- In office 27 June 2017 – 4 September 2018
- Preceded by: Claude Bartolone
- Succeeded by: Richard Ferrand

Member of the National Assembly for Loire-Atlantique's 1st constituency
- In office 17 August 2019 – 21 June 2022
- Preceded by: Mounir Belhamiti
- Succeeded by: Mounir Belhamiti
- In office 20 June 2007 – 5 October 2018
- Preceded by: Jean-Pierre Le Ridant
- Succeeded by: Mounir Belhamiti

Personal details
- Born: 6 December 1973 (age 52) Nantes, France
- Party: Renaissance (2017–present)
- Other political affiliations: GE (1991–1994); LV (1997–2010); EELV (2010–2015); PE (2015–present)
- Spouse: Séverine Servat (m. 2017)
- Children: 2
- Education: Sciences Po

François Henri Goullet de Rugy (French pronunciation: [fʁɑ̃swa ɑ̃ʁi ɡulɛ də ʁyʒi]; born 6 December 1973) is a French politician who served as President of the National Assembly from 2017 to 2018 and Minister of Ecological and Solidary Transition from 2018 to 2019.

From 2007, De Rugy represented the Loire-Atlantique department, with an interruption between 2018 and 2019, originally as a member of the Democratic and Republican Left group, which includes his former political party Europe Ecology – The Greens. In 2015, he joined the Ecologist Party and later the La République En Marche group in Parliament. In 2017, he defeated Jean-Charles Taugourdeau and Laure de la Raudière for the presidency of the National Assembly.

He was appointed Minister of Ecological and Solidary Transition after the resignation of Nicolas Hulot. De Rugy resigned from his ministership less than a year following his appointment after allegations of excessive spending of public funds for private use. He regained his seat in Parliament.

De Rugy did not seek re-election at the 2022 parliamentary election.

== Political career ==
=== Member of the National Assembly ===
First elected to the National Assembly in the 2007 legislative election, he was reelected in 2012. In 2012, he was elected to the co-presidency of the newly founded Ecologist group, alongside Barbara Pompili. In 2015, he broke with Europe Ecology – The Greens to form a new party with Jean-Vincent Placé, the Ecologist Party, which supported the administration of President François Hollande. He was succeeded as group co-president by Cécile Duflot before regaining the office following the Pompili's appointment as Secretary of State for Biodiversity.

As a member of the National Assembly, he supported the 2015 Intelligence Act and 2016 Labour Act.

In 2016, De Rugy announced a campaign for the 2017 Socialist Party presidential primary in which he secured 3.8% of the vote in the first round, outstripping polls. Though he promised to support the primary winner, he reneged on that commitment in late February, instead backing Emmanuel Macron over Benoît Hamon. De Rugy was subsequently invested by En Marche! in the upcoming legislative election.

=== Presidency of the National Assembly ===
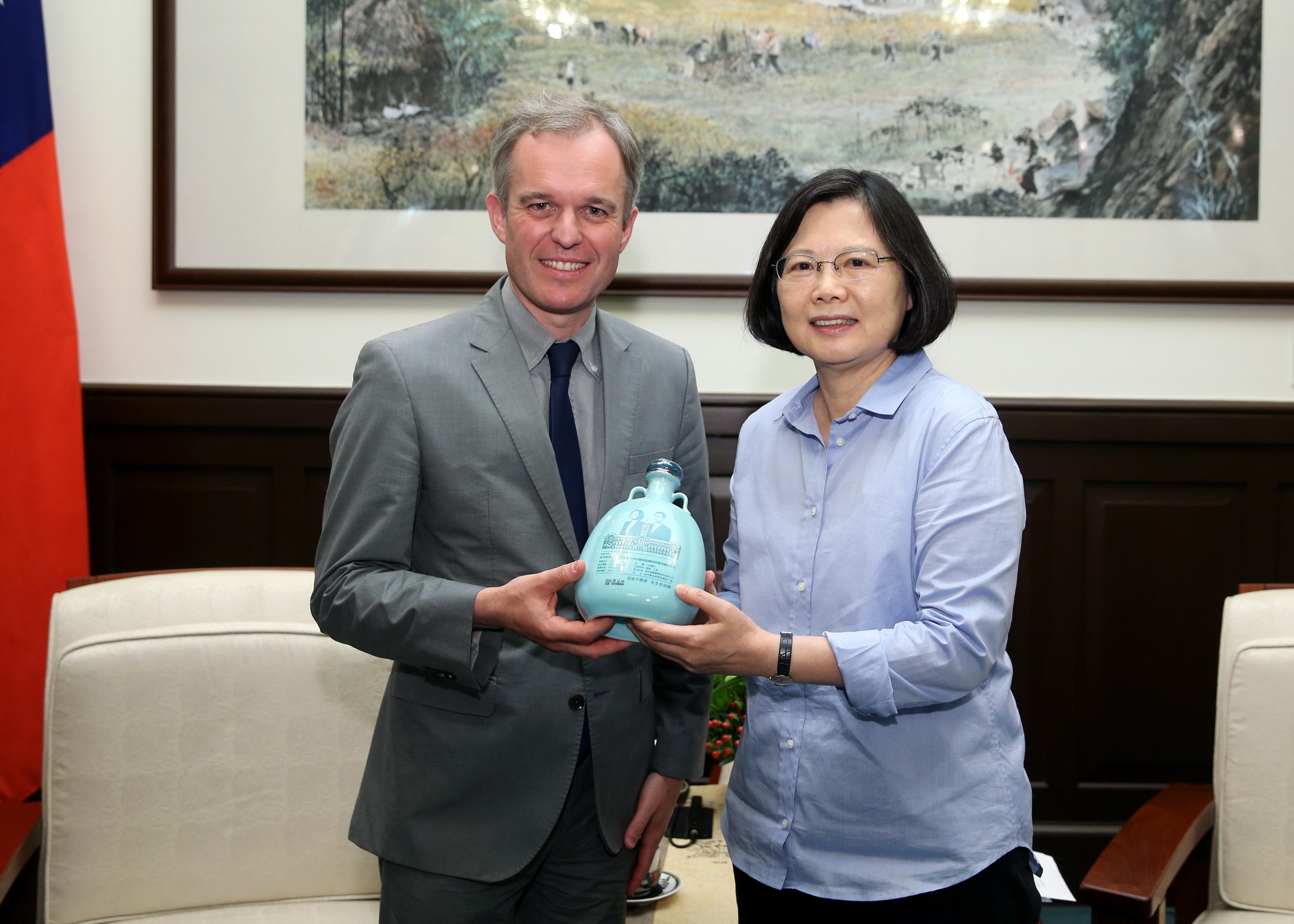
François de Rugy as Vice President of the National Assembly with Tsai Ing-wen, President of the Taiwan, in 2016

On 18 May 2016, François de Rugy succeeded Denis Baupin as a Vice President of the National Assembly. He has resigned as group co-president the previous day. On 27 June 2017, De Rugy was elected President of the National Assembly after being chosen as candidate by the La République En Marche group with 353 votes (out of 577 members).

=== Minister of Ecological and Solidary Transition ===
On 4 September 2018, De Rugy was appointed Minister of Ecological and Solidary Transition in the government of Prime Minister Édouard Philippe. He replaced Nicolas Hulot who had announced his resignation on 28 August 2018 on France Inter. On 10 July 2019, online magazine Mediapart revealed that €63,000 of public money had been spent on refurbishment of De Rugy's official apartment in Paris (including €19,000 on a dressing room). The magazine also published photographs of lobster and champagne dinners. On 16 July 2019, De Rugy resigned as Ecology Minister.

=== Return to the National Assembly ===
On 17 August 2019, François de Rugy regained his seat in the National Assembly. In September 2020, he was a candidate to succeed Gilles Le Gendre as LREM group president in the National Assembly. He came in third behind Christophe Castaner and Aurore Bergé. In the final round, he endorsed Bergé.

In the 2021 regional election, De Rugy led the LREM list in Pays de la Loire (supported by the Democratic Movement and Radical Movement), which placed fifth, with 11.9% of the vote in the first round and 8.20% in the second round.

In addition to his committee assignments, De Rugy chaired the France-Taiwan parliamentary friendship group.

In February 2022, De Rugy announced that he would not stand in the 2022 elections but instead resign from active politics by the end of the parliamentary term.

== Career after politics ==
In 2022, De Rugy founded NaoKern Conseil, a consulting firm. In 2023, he was appointed by Spanish investment bank Alantra to co-chair the firm's newly established Energy Transition Group, alongside Nemesio Fernández-Cuesta.
