= Karim Benbrahim =

French politician (born 1980)

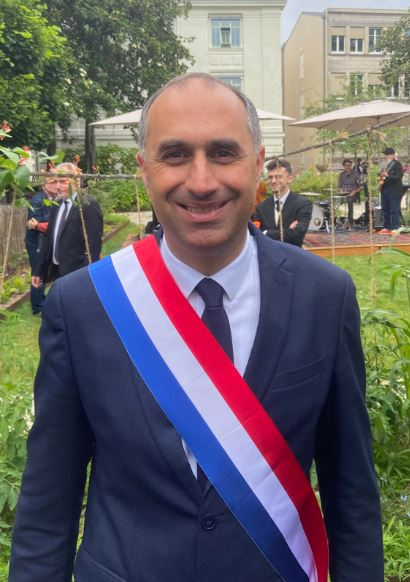
- Benbrahim in 2024

Member of the French National Assembly for Loire-Atlantique's 1st constituency
- Incumbent
- Assumed office 18 July 2024
- Preceded by: Mounir Belhamiti

Personal details
- Born: 13 April 1980 (age 45); Salon-de-Provence, France
- Political party: Socialist Party

Karim Benbrahim (born 13 April 1980) is a French politician of the Socialist Party. In the 2024 legislative election, he was elected member of the National Assembly for Loire-Atlantique's 1st constituency. He is the leader of the Socialist Party in Loire-Atlantique and was a candidate for the constituency in the 2022 legislative election.

== Biography ==
Karim Benbrahim was born on the 1st of April 1980 in Salon-de-Provence located in the Bouches-du- Rhônes department. He's the son of a small shopkeeper of Tunisian descent.

Karim Benbrahim is an engineer in the renewable energy department in the RTE branch in Nantes.

== Political career ==
=== Early Political career ===
Karim Benbrahim joined the Socialist Party in 2005 in the wake of the French European Constitutional referendum.

Indeed, he positioned himself against the Treaty establishing a Constitution for Europe. He then stayed multiple years as a member of the party. During this time, he participated in multiple protests and events organized by the socialist party. He was engaged in a variety of activities, such as sticking posters on walls and organizing public meetings.

Karim Benbrahim continued his ascension to the socialist party ladder in 2014. Indeed, he was present as a substitute for the departmental elections.

He was elected as the secretary of the northern section of the socialist party in Nantes. This election was made by the party members. It was a part of a larger set of elections of the Loire-Atlantique's Socialist party. Theses elections were made in two rounds, during the 21st and 28th of May 2015. This result was furthermore confirmed during the Saint-Herblain federal congress on the 30th of May 2015.
