= Henri Anger =

French journalist and writer (1907–1989)

- Born: 8 June 1907; La Baule-Escoublac
- Died: 1989 (aged 81–82); Morlaix
- Occupation: Writer

Henri Anger (8 June 1907 – 1989) was a French journalist and writer. Entered at Télégramme de Brest et de l'Ouest in 1944, he became its chief editor in 1965. He used to sign his columns under the pseudonym Kerdaniel.

After he finished his studies at lycée de Nantes, he became a journalist at age 16 for Le Populaire de Nantes.

Henri Anger won the 1983 edition of the Prix Roland de Jouvenel awarded by the Académie française with his novel Une petite fille en colère as well as the 1988 edition of the Prix des Deux Magots with his novel La Mille-et-Unième Rue.

== Works ==
- 1979: Chatte allaitant un ourson, Grasset
- 1980: L'An Quarante, Grasset
- 1982: Une Petite fille en colère, Gallimard
- 1987: La Mille-et-Unième Rue, Julliard, Prix des Deux Magots
- 1989: Monte-Carlo blues, Julliard
