= René Waldeck-Rousseau (born 1809) =

French politician (1809–1882)

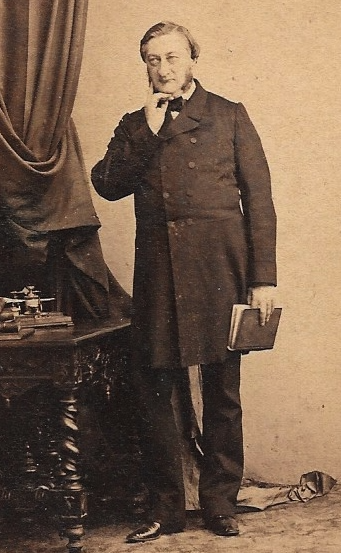
René Waldeck-Rousseau, father

René Waldeck-Rousseau (27 September 1809 Avranches, Manche – 17 February 1882 Nantes, Loire-Atlantique) was a French politician, father of Pierre Waldeck-Rousseau who was a statesman during the Third Republic.

During the 1848 Revolution, he was elected as a Republican deputy of Loire-Inférieure to the Constituent Assembly of April 1848 to May 1849. He then became mayor of Nantes, from 1870 to 1871 and a second time from 1872 to 1873.

With Jules Simon, Louis Blanc and others he sat on the commission appointed to inquire into the labour question during the Second Republic, making many important proposals, one of which, for the establishment of national banks, was partially realized in 1850. After the election of Louis Napoleon Bonaparte to the presidency he returned to his practice at the bar, and for some time after the coup d'état was in hiding to escape arrest.

He came back to political life in the crisis of 1870, when he became mayor of Nantes in August and took part to the proclamation of the Third Republic there on September 4. He shortly afterwards resigned municipal office in consequence of differences with his colleagues on the education question.
