= Timeline of Angers =

The following is a timeline of the history of the city of Angers, France.

== Prior to 19th century ==
- 372 – Roman Catholic Diocese of Angers established.
- 471 – Merovingians in power.
- 8th century – Angers becomes part of Anjou province.
- 851 – Frankish-Breton treaty signed in Angers.
- 870 – Duke of Anjou centered in Angers.
- 1025 – Angers Cathedral built.
- 1028 – Abbaye du Ronceray d'Angers founded.
- 1059 – Abbaye Saint-Serge d'Angers rebuilt.
- 12th century – Trinity Church, Angers construction begins.
- 1151 – Henry Plantagenet becomes count of Anjou and Maine (and king of England in 1154).
- 1184 – Hôpital Saint-Jean built.
- 13th century – Château d'Angers (castle) enlarged.
- 1288 – Jews expelled from Anjou.
- 1364 – Universitas Andegavensis active.
- 1380 – Apocalypse Tapestry created.
- 1384 – Public clock installed.
- 1487 - Logis Barrault mansion built.
- 1508 - Anjou customary laws published.
- 1516 - Grand jour (judicial proceeding) takes place.
- 1539 – Grand jour (judicial proceeding) takes place.
- 1585 – Huguenots in power.
- 1589 – Catholic League active, then quashed.
- 1685 - Académie des sciences, belles lettres et arts d'Angers founded.
- 1790 – Angers becomes part of the Maine-et-Loire souveraineté.
- 1791 – Angers Public Library founded.
- 1793
  - February: Liberty pole erected in the Place du Ralliement.
  - December: Siege of Angers.
- 1796 – Archives départementales de Maine-et-Loire established.
- 1797 – Musée des Beaux-Arts d'Angers established.

== 19th century ==
- 1806 – Population: 29,187.
- 1823 – Hôtel de Ville completed.
- 1839 – Basse-Chaine Bridge built.
- 1849 – Cointreau distillery in business.
- 1850 – 16 April: Collapse of the Basse-Chaine Bridge.
- 1855 – Chamber of Commerce established.
- 1856 – Population: 50,726.
- 1859 – Café Serin in business.
- 1869 – Patriote de l'Ouest newspaper begins publication.
- 1871 – Grand Théâtre (Angers) opens.
- 1873 – Journal de Maine-et-Loire newspaper begins publication.
- 1875 – Catholic University of Angers active.
- 1876 – Population: 56,846.
- 1878 – Gare d'Angers-Saint-Serge (rail station) opens.
- 1883 – Petit Courrier newspaper begins publication.
- 1886 – Population: 73,044.
- 1889 – Musée Pincé opens.
- 1895 – Jardin botanique de la Faculté de Pharmacie d'Angers (garden) established.
- 1896 – Angers tramway (1896) begins operating.

== 20th century ==
- 1901 – Galeries Lafayette (Angers) built on Rue d'Alsace (Angers).
- 1911 – Population: 83,786.
- 1914 – Avrillé airfield begins operating.
- 1919 – Angers SCO (sport club) formed.
- 1937
  - Parc de la Garenne created.
  - Roman-era archaeological remains found.
- 1940 – June: German occupation begins.
- 1944
  - May: Bombing by Allied forces.
  - August: German occupation ends.
  - Le Courrier de l'Ouest newspaper begins publication.
- 1964 – Angers twinned with Haarlem, Netherlands.
- 1967 – 1967 Tour de France cycling race departs from Angers.
- 1968 – Musée Jean-Lurçat et de la tapisserie contemporaine opens.
- 1971 – University of Angers and Orchestre Philharmonique des Pays de la Loire established.
- 1972 – 1972 Tour de France cycling race departs from Angers.
- 1973
  - Pont de l'Atlantique (Angers) (bridge) built.
  - Association généalogique de l'Anjou formed.
- 1974 – Angers twinned with Bamako, Mali.
- 1980 – Association des musulmans d'Angers founded.
- 1982
  - Angers becomes part of the Pays de la Loire region.
  - Ducs d'Angers ice hockey team formed.
  - Angers twinned with Pisa, Italy.
- 1983 – Centre de congrès d'Angers (assembly hall) built.
- 1985 – Parc des expositions d'Angers developed.
- 1986 – Nouveau théâtre d'Angers established.
- 1988
  - TV10 Angers begins broadcasting.
  - Angers twinned with Wigan, United Kingdom.
- 1991 – Amphitéa assembly hall built.
- 1994 – Théâtre de la Comédie d'Angers opens.
- 1999 – Population: 151,279.

== 21st century ==
- 2005 – Angers child sexual abuse case tried.
- 2007
  - Le Quai cultural space opens.
  - Angers 7 television begins broadcasting.
- 2011
  - Angers tramway begins operating.
  - City partnered with Austin, Texas, USA.
  - Population: 148,803.
- 2014
  - March: Angers municipal election, 2014 held.
  - Christophe Béchu becomes mayor.
  - Mosque construction begins.
- 2015 – December: Pays de la Loire regional election, 2015 held.

== See also ==
- Angers history
- History of Angers
- Juliomagus (Roman era settlement)
- List of heritage sites in Angers
- List of mayors of Angers
- List of counts of Anjou (residing in Angers beginning in 9th c.)
- History of Anjou
- History of Maine-et-Loire department

other cities in the Pays de la Loire region

- Timeline of Le Mans
- Timeline of Nantes

== Bibliography ==
=== in English ===
- Abraham Rees (1819), "Angers", The Cyclopaedia, London: Longman, Hurst, Rees, Orme & Brown, hdl:2027/mdp.39015012312156
- William Henry Overall, ed. (1870). "Angers". Dictionary of Chronology. London: William Tegg. hdl:2027/uc2.ark:/13960/t9m32q949.
- "Angers". Chambers's Encyclopaedia. London. 1901. hdl:2027/njp.32101065312868.
- Israël Lévi [in French] (1901), "Anjou", Jewish Encyclopedia, vol. 1, New York, hdl:2027/mdp.49015002282318
- "Angers" . Encyclopædia Britannica. Vol. 2 (11th ed.). 1910. pp. 8–9.
- R. Edouard André (1938). "Horticulture in Town Planning: The Formation of a Park System at Angers, France". Town Planning Review. 18 (1): 51–55. doi:10.3828/tpr.18.1.41464w846k0q6233. JSTOR 40101790.
- Jean Caswell; Ivan Sipkov (1977). "Anjou". Coutumes of France in the Library of Congress: an Annotated Bibliography. USA: Library of Congress. hdl:2027/mdp.39015034753866. ISBN 978-0-8444-0232-1.
- Jeff W. Huebner (1995). "Angers". In Trudy Ring (ed.). Northern Europe. International Dictionary of Historic Places. Fitzroy Dearborn. ISBN 978-1-136-63944-9.
- Colum Hourihane, ed. (2012). "Angers". Grove Encyclopedia of Medieval Art and Architecture. Oxford University Press. p. 72+. ISBN 978-0-19-539536-5.

=== in French ===
- Jean-François Bodin [in French] (1847). Recherches historiques sur l'Anjou (in French) (2nd ed.). Cosnier et Lachèse.
- Ch. Brossard (1901). "Anjou: Maine-et-Loire: Description des villes: Angers". La France de l'Ouest. Géographie pittoresque et monumentale de la France (in French). Flammarion. hdl:2027/nyp.33433066581129. (+ table of contents)
- "Angers". Basse-Loire. À la France: sites et monuments (in French). Paris: Touring-Club de France. 1901. OCLC 457600236.
- "Angers". La Loire. Guides Joanne (in French). Hachette et cie. 1903. hdl:2027/hvd.hxnvkh.
- "Angers". Dictionnaire Bouillet (in French) (34th ed.). Hachette. 1914. hdl:2027/mdp.39015074817142.
