= Jean-Pierre Le Ridant =

French politician

Deputy of the 1st constituency of Loire-Atlantique
- In office June 18, 2002 – June 20, 2007
- Preceded by: Patrick Rimbert
- Succeeded by: François de Rugy

Personal details
- Born: February 4, 1948 (age 78) Riaillé, France
- Party: Union for a Popular Movement
- Occupation: Politician; Administrative framework

Jean-Pierre Le Ridant (born February 4, 1948) is a French politician and administrative framework. He is member of the Union for a Popular Movement party. He served as deputy of the 1st constituency of Loire-Atlantique from 2002 to 2007. He was beaten in his turn by François de Rugy, Green candidate supported by the PS on June 19, 2007. Jean-Pierre Le Ridant also elected deputy of the XIIe legislatures.

== Biography ==
Jean-Pierre Le Ridant was born in Riaillé, France on 1948. He was part of the Union for a Popular Movement group.

Political offices
Preceded by Patrick Rimbert	Deputy of the 1st constituency of Loire-Atlantique; 18 June 2002 – 20 June 2007	Succeeded by François de Rugy
