= Marc Elder =

French writer and art historian

Marc Elder (Marcel Tendron) (31 October 1884, Nantes – 16 August 1933, Saint-Fiacre-sur-Maine) was a French writer, winner of the Prix Goncourt for The People of the Sea.

== Life ==
He was a critic and art historian, a Knight of the Legion of Honor, he was curator of the Chateau des Ducs de Bretagne, in Nantes. The Place Marc Elder in the center of Nantes is named for him.

== Works ==
- Le Peuple de la mer, G. Oudin, 1914
- Deux essais: Octave Mirbeau, Romain Rolland, G. Crès, 1914
- La vie apostolique de Vincent Vingeame, Calmann-Lévy, 1917
- Le sang des dieux, A. Michel, 1921
- À Giverny, chez Claude Monet, Bernheim-Jeune, 1924
- Gabriel-Belot, peintre imagier, A. Delpeuch, 1927
- Pays de Retz, Emile-Paul, 1928
- Les Dames Pirouette,' J. Ferenczi & fils, 1929
- Croisières J. Ferenczi & Fils, 1931
- La belle Eugénie: roman, Ferenczi et fils, 1931
- Jacques et Jean: bois originaux en couleurs de Robert Antral, Ferenczi et Fils, 1931
- La Bourrine - Le Beau livre N°4, 1932
- Jacques Cassard: corsaire de Nantes, J. Ferenczi, 1933
- Marc Elder, ou, Un rêve écartelé, Roger Douillard ed., Cid éditions, 1987

=== Anthologies ===
- Charles F. Stuckey, ed. (1985). "A Giverny, chez Claude Monet". Monet: a retrospective. Beaux Arts Editions. ISBN 978-0-88363-301-4.
