= Nantes Congress =

Sixth national congress of the French Socialist Party

The Nantes Congress was the sixth national congress of the French Socialist Party (Parti socialiste or PS). It took place from 17 to 18 June 1977, directly after the left's victory in the local elections.

At the Congress, the more moderate François Mitterrand comprehensively defeated the left wing challenger Jean-Pierre Chevènement.

== Results ==
Popular vote
François Mitterrand	75.79%
Jean-Pierre Chevènement	24.21%

François Mitterrand was re-elected as First Secretary.
