= Charles Gautier =

French politician

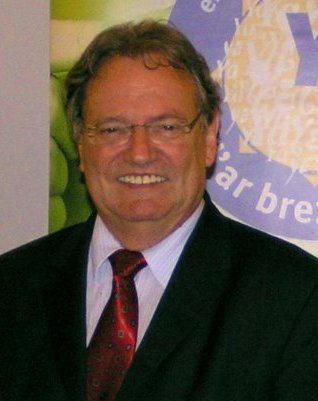

Mayor of Saint-Herblain
- In office 20 March 1989 – 6 April 2014
- Preceded by: Jean-Marc Ayrault
- Succeeded by: Bertrand Affilé

Member of the French Senate for Loire-Atlantique
- In office 1 October 2001 – 30 September 2011

Personal details
- Born: 25 January 1945 Plélan-le-Grand, France
- Died: 11 June 2014 (aged 69) Saint-Herblain, France
- Party: Socialist Party

Charles Gautier (French pronunciation: [ʃaʁl ɡotje]; 25 January 1945 – 11 June 2014) was a French politician who was a member of the Senate of France, representing the Loire-Atlantique department. He was a member of the Socialist Party; a former mayor of Saint-Herblain, he died of colon cancer at his home in the town.

== Biography ==
The son of schoolteachers, Charles Gautier was born at the very end of World War II in Plélan-le-Grand. After attending Saint-Vincent School in Rennes and Sainte-Geneviève High School in Versailles, he studied at the National Higher School of Agronomy in Rennes and the National Higher Institute of Agronomy, Food and Environment in Dijon.

An agricultural engineer, he spent his entire career in agricultural education. He taught at the agricultural high school in La Roche-sur-Yon from 1971 to 1974, then at the National School of Agricultural and Food Industry Engineering in Nantes from 1974 to 1984. Finally, he served as national inspector of agricultural and food education from 1984 to 2001.

He died on June 11, 2014, from Colorectal cancer.

In his honor, in Saint-Herblain, Boulevard de La Baule, which connects the Porte d'Armor roundabout to the Abel Durand roundabout, and the Hermeland media library have been renamed after him.
