= Patrick Rimbert =

French politician

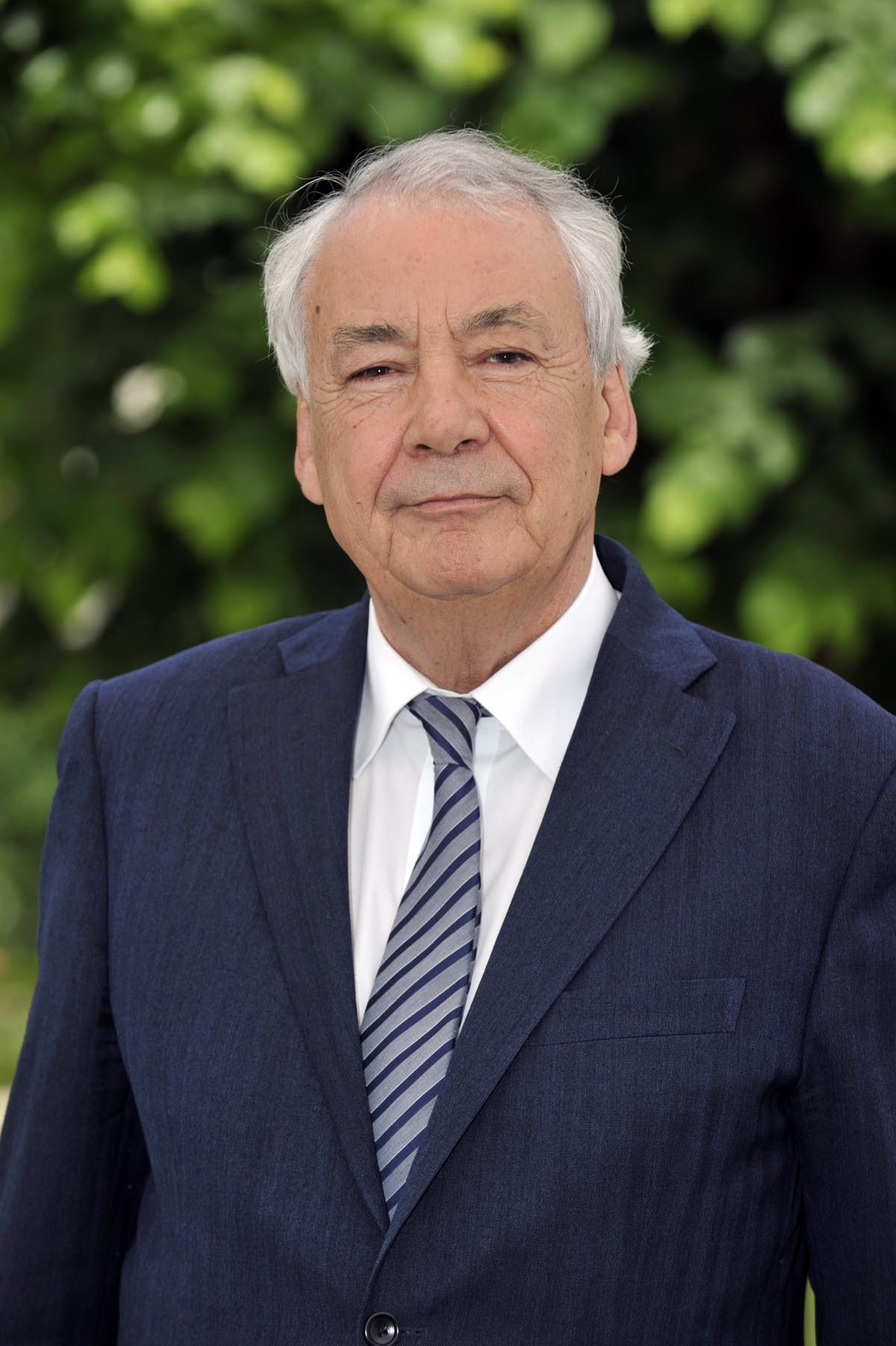
- Mayor of Nantes, since June 29, 2012.

Mayor of Nantes
- In office June 29, 2012 – April 4, 2014
- Preceded by: Jean-Marc Ayrault
- Succeeded by: Johanna Rolland

Deputy of the 1st constituency of Loire-Atlantique
- In office June 12, 1997 – June 18, 2002
- Preceded by: Monique Papon
- Succeeded by: Jean-Pierre Le Ridant

Personal details
- Born: July 20, 1944 (age 80); Blain, Loire-Atlantique, France
- Political party: Socialist Party
- Occupation: Politician

Patrick Rimbert (French pronunciation: [patʁik ʁɛ̃bɛʁ]; July 20, 1944) is a French politician. He is a member of the Socialist Party. He served as Mayor of Nantes from 2012 to 2014. He was deputy of the 1st constituency of Loire-Atlantique from 1997 to 2002. He was elected president of the Nantes region planning agency on January 14, 2015. He was general councilor of Loire-Atlantique from 1992 to 2001.

== Biography ==
Patrick Rimbert was born in Blain, France on 1944. He becomes an economics professor. Patrick Rimbert then succeeds him as interim head of the municipality on June 21, then is elected mayor of Nantes by the municipal council on June 29.

Political offices
| Preceded by Jean-Marc Ayrault | Mayor of Nantes; 29 June 2012 – 4 April 2014 | Succeeded by Johanna Rolland |
| Preceded by Monique Papon | Deputy of the 1st constituency of Loire-Atlantique; 12 June 1997 – 18 June 2002 | Succeeded by Jean-Pierre Le Ridant |
