= Les Anneaux de la Mémoire =

Shackles of Memory
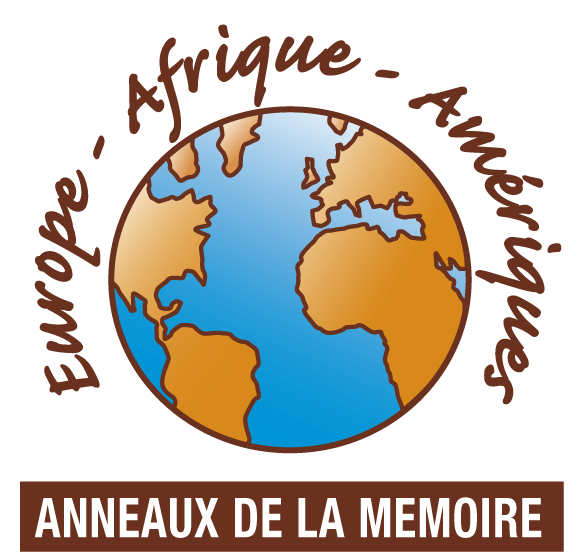
- Formation: 1991, Nantes, France
- Legal status: Association loi 1901
- Purpose: History of the slave trade and slavery. Consequences and contemporary legacy.
- Headquarters: Espace Cosmopolis - 18 rue Scribe 44000 Nantes, France
- Region served: Atlantic world (Africa, Americas, Caribbean, Europa) and Indian ocean
- Website: anneauxdelamemoire.org

The organization Les Anneaux de la mémoire (literally The Rings of Memory in English) is an association under French law. Its objective is to make better known the history of the slave trade and slavery and their current consequences, in the perspective of making an experiment among many others, of work of memory whose theory remains to be done, in order to promote exchanges, balanced and equitable, between the societies of Africa, America and Europe. The Rings of Memory develop and implement exhibitions, publications, cultural actions at local and international level. Shared values (freedom, respect, equality, solidarity) and the search for scientific validity in its approach to historical, social and economic facts underlie all the association's activities today. They are at the origin of multiple cultural actions, international conferences and symposia, publications, educational activities and numerous cultural and tourist development projects, in the framework of actions built with interlocutors from the three continents.

The Rings of Memory develop and implement exhibitions, publications, cultural actions at local and international level. Shared values (freedom, respect, equality, solidarity) and the search for scientific validity in its approach to historical, social and economic facts underlie all the association's activities today. They are at the origin of multiple cultural actions, international conferences and symposia, publications, educational activities and numerous cultural and tourist development projects, in the framework of actions built with interlocutors from the three continents.

== History ==
Wishing to break away from the denial of the past, the founders of the rings of memory wanted to participate in the need to confront the memories of the past, convinced that in Nantes as elsewhere that «Memory is the health of the world» (Erick Orsenna).

The association was born in Nantes in 1991. His first projects concerned the City of Nantes, the first French trading port in the 18th century, and its region. In 1992, the association organized the exhibition «The Rings of Memory» whose name it later retained. This exhibition will be a considerable success, with more than 400,000 visitors on a particularly sensitive subject and well beyond the city of Nantes alone. It marks an essential turning point in the memory work of memory conducted in Nantes, France and around the Atlantic world. Researchers, historians and citizens are still inspired by it. She played a considerable role in the recognition in France and in the world of the history of trafficking and slavery.

Meaning of the name “The Rings of Memory”:

The Rings of Memory symbolize the instruments of restraint of captives on ships and people enslaved on plantations but also the historical chain that connects people through time and continents and finally alliances and exchanges people in mutual respect and benevolence.

== The foundation exhibition «The Rings of Memory» ==
In 1985 the colloquium «De la traite à l'esclavage» gathered at the University of Nantes more than a hundred personalities of the world scientific community. This is the first time in France that a demonstration of this magnitude has been organized. 1985 also celebrates the tercentenary of Colbert's Code Noir. In the wake of these two events, the association Les Anneaux de la mémoire was created by Nantais anxious to break the silence around these centuries of French colonial history. The Rings of Memory were officially incorporated as an association in 1901 in February 1991.

Between December 1992 and May 1994, with the support of the municipality of the time, the association organized at the Château des Ducs de Bretagne the exhibition The Rings of Memory, the largest international exhibition ever held on this theme. The exhibition traces the history of the transatlantic trade practised by Europeans from the 15th to the 19th century. The exhibition received 400,000 visitors and, thanks to the support of UNESCO and its programme "The Slave Route" today "Route of the Enslaved People" had an international impact. Since then, the association has expanded its associative activity by multiplying its actions in France and abroad, aimed at young people as well as the general public and researchers initiated in historical research.

Since 1994, following the exhibition at the castle of the dukes of Brittany The Rings of Memory, Nantes associations (Rings of Memory, Memory of Overseas, Métis in Nantes, etc.) have begun work to raise public awareness and lobby local governments to promote the creation of a major international museum of trafficking and slavery in Nantes. The Nantes municipality took the decision to build a Memorial of the Abolition of Slavery, which was inaugurated in 2012, facing the courthouse, on the banks of the Loire.

== The Library of the Rings of Memory ==
=== « Les Cahiers des Anneaux de la Mémoire » ===
In 1999, the Association des Anneaux de la Mémoire created an annual review: «Les Cahiers des anneaux de la Mémoire» which explores the themes of slave trade, slavery and its contemporary consequences with the intention of contributing to the demand for memory work that was asserted at that time in French society.

Each volume consists of ten to fifteen articles written by international researchers in the humanities and by civil society actors. The Cahiers des Anneaux de la mémoire are a space for meetings, dialogues and debates between international researchers, young or confirmed, Europeans, Africans, Americans, the Middle East and the Indian Ocean. The association hopes that this journal will also be a forum for young African researchers, whose work is often poorly disseminated. This publication activity is central to the association's activity and responds to its desire to transmit and disseminate research on these themes.

The objective of this publication is twofold:

Enabling historians to build a universal and scientific history: by collecting and disseminating reference works on the Atlantic slave trade; by encouraging research into other trade circuits, both land and sea; by studying the construction and evolution of slave systems. To contribute to the awareness of all the legacies that the history of slavery and colonization has left us: questioning the models and institutions born of these confrontations; measuring the past's contribution to the construction of our cultural landmarks; exploring the traces of these collective traumas in the psychic memory and the dynamics of identity constructions. by questioning the permanence within the contemporary world, of false representations inherited from history. Editor: Jean-Marc Masseaut

Titles published:

The slave trade, its history, its memory, its effects - 1999 Slavery and Slavery in the Indian Ocean - 2000 The Trade and Slavery in the Lusophone World; The French Revolution and Slavery; Debates Today - 2001 The Milkings in Africa; Black Pirates and Sailors of the Milking - 2002 Women in Trafficking and Slavery - 2003 Haiti: Raw materials - 2004 Haiti in the world - 2004 Cuba - 2005 From Africa to the Far East - 2006 Ports and the Slave Trade: Nantes - 2007 Ports and the Slave Trade: France - 2008 Plastic creation, milking and slavery - 2009 The Mediterranean - 2010 Central Atlantic Africa - 2011 Creoles in the French Americas - 2014 The Loire and Atlantic trade - 17th-19th centuries - 2015 Colour and freedom in the French colonial space – 18th-19th century - 2017 Guadeloupe - 2018 The right to the service of slaves - 2021 Subversions, emancipation and abolition - 2023

=== Exhibition catalogues ===
The Rings of Memory publishes exhibition catalogues and works for all audiences.

== Exhibition creations ==
Date	Titre	Lieux	Thématique
1992-1994	Les Anneaux de la Mémoire, Nantes – Afrique – Amériques.	Château des ducs de Bretagne – Nantes (France)	Themes: trafficking, slavery, triangular trade, abolition.
1998-1999	Mémoires des migrations. Tolérance, intolérances.	Espace Cosmopolis – Nantes (France)	Themes: religious tolerance, attached to the edict of Nantes, is extended here to that of the coexistence of different populations in the same territory
1999-2000	Des bords de Loire aux rives du Mississipi	France / Louisiane, Texas, Floride	Themes: This exhibition evokes the years 1750–1830, during which Nantes and the West of France participated in the birth of the States-United States of America by assisting in the War of Independence and contributing to settlement through colonization and emigration.
2010-2012	D’Ayiti à Haïti : la Liberté conquise		Themes: History of Haiti, from origins to independence in 1804.
2014 et 2016	Des bords de Loire à l’île de la Tortue – Histoire entrelacée de l’Anjou et des Antilles	Chapelle Sainte-Barbe – Chalonnes-sur-Loire (France) / Hôtel des pénitentes – Angers (France)	Exhibition created as part of the local program «Loire des Lumières».Themes: Anjou and the West Indies from the 15th^{th} to the 19th^{th} century / Bertrand d'Ogeron / slavery / abolition / trade / shipowners.
2016 - 2018	Mémoires Libérées Afrique, Caraïbes, Europe, des origines aux héritages de l’esclavage	Hôtel du département – Nantes (France) / Mupanah – Port-au-Prince (Haïti) – Musée national – Yaoundé (Cameroun)	Exhibition created within the framework of the international program TOSTEM. The objectives of this exhibition ~~sont~~aim to reconcile the duty of remembrance with historical truth, while highlighting the consequences for our present societies.
2017- 2019	Grâce aux prisonniers – Bonchamps et David d’Angers, Lumières sur un chef d’œuvre	Abbaye de Saint-Florent-le-Vieil - Mauges-sur-Loire (France) / Hôtel de Ville de Saint-Sébastien-sur-Loire (France) / Musée d’art et d’histoire – Cholet (France)	Themes: memories/ arts/ Restoration/ Civil Wars/ Vendée Wars
2021 (exposition permanente)	Femme et esclavages - Histoire de combats pour la liberté	Ouidah, Bénin - Centre Culturel de Rencontre International John Smith	Artistic and historical exhibition Themes: Slavery/ factory work/ globalization
2021-2022	Coton, la conquête du Monde	Musée d'Art et d'Histoire de Cholet	Exhibition in co-production with Cholet MuseumsThemes: Slavery/ factory work/ globalization

== Cultural activities, educational activities, support & services ==
The Rings of Memory set up awareness-raising activities aimed at the public, especially the youngest, in an effort to popularize the historical and pedagogical knowledge of the history of the slave trade, slavery and its contemporary consequences. Several activities around these topics are now proposed by the association.

=== Guided tour «In the footsteps of Nantes slave port» ===
The association offers school students and other groups of adults guided tours of the city center of Nantes, to discover the slave trade and historical past of the city and its port, of its architecture, and of the relations maintained by the political elites, merchants of the 18th – 19th centuries of the city with the questions of trade, slavery and abolition. The memorial issues of the 19th – 20th – 21st centuries are also discussed. Guided tours are available upon request.

=== Mobile Exhibits ===
The association of the Rings of Memory offers tools and interventions on the history of the Atlantic slave trade, slavery and its legacies including mobile exhibitions available for rent:

• Exhibit on the history of the Atlantic Slave Trade and colonial slavery, resistances and legacies (racism and discrimination, modern slavery)

• Exhibition on the history and heritage of the Atlantic slave trade in Europe, Africa and the Caribbean

• Exhibition on the history of Haiti

=== The teaching sheets ===
Since 2015, the association has been producing teaching sheets for children from 5 years old and middle school students from 12 years old. These fact sheets cover themes related to geography, history, culture and nature. They are available on the association's website or on its premises.

=== Intervention with the public ===
The Rings of Memory intervene with the public on request. Speakers are members of the Rings of Memory, historians, activists or specialized stakeholders.

=== Mastery & museography ===
The Rings of Memory carry out various mastery and museography projects. For thirty years, the association has been working on exhibitions and heritage projects.

== Conferences, symposia and scientific meetings ==
In order to continue the memory work carried out since 1991, The Rings of Memory organize and participate in scientific meetings in order to develop and disseminate knowledge and research on the history of the colonial slave trade and its legacies. Punctual meetings are regularly organized.

Some examples of events organized by The Rings of Memory:

Centre for the Study of the Rings of Memory (CEAM)

In 2002, the association and the University of Nantes created a study center dedicated to research on the one hand on the Atlantic slave trade and slavery, and on the other hand on the slave trade and slavery throughout the history of humanity. An annual cycle of conferences open to the public was organized until 2012. From 2002 to 2009, the CEAM organizes introductory workshops to historical research, and participates in the Campus numérique juridique international CODES (Campus Ouvert, Droit, Éthique et Société).

=== Organisation of international conferences ===
The association organizes international meetings aimed at developing relations and transcontinental achievements between Europe, Africa and America.

1993: «L'Afrique des interrogations» in Nantes (France) 1994: «The new Europe-Americas trade: the Caribbean way» in Nantes (France) 1997: «The legacy of the past: five centuries of Europe-Africa-Americas relations» in Dakar (Senegal) 2005: The colonial experience - Dynamics of exchanges in Atlantic spaces in the era of slavery, 15th – 19th centuries in Nantes (France) – In partnership with EHESS of Paris. 2009: “Trade and Slavery” in Bamendjinda, Cameroon. – Symposium organized for the inauguration of the Museum of Arts, Traditions and Slavery of Bamendjinda. 2019: «Memories of the civil wars» in Cholet (France)- In partnership with the Cholet Museums, the University of Nantes, the Catholic University of the West. 2022: «ESCLAVAGES, des traites aux émancipations, trente ans de recherche historique» in Nantes (France)- In partnership with CRHIA de Nantes Université
