= Johanna Rolland =

French politician

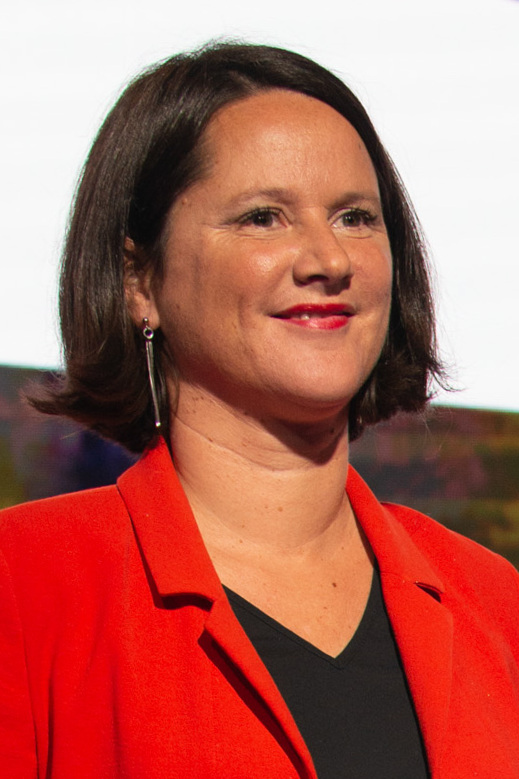
- Rolland in 2019

Mayor of Nantes
- Incumbent
- Assumed office 4 April 2014
- Preceded by: Patrick Rimbert

President of Nantes Métropole
- Incumbent
- Assumed office 16 April 2014
- Preceded by: Gilles Retière

Personal details
- Born: 11 May 1979 (age 47) Nantes, France
- Party: Socialist Party
- Education: Sciences Po Lille; University of Grenoble

Johanna Rolland (born 11 May 1979) is a French politician, belonging to the Socialist Party. She is the current mayor of Nantes, being the first woman to hold this position. As of April 2014, she is one of six female mayors of French cities with more than 100,000 inhabitants.

Rolland also serves as president of both the Nantes Métropole and the Metropolitan Center of Nantes - Saint-Nazaire.
