= François Autain =

French politician (1935–2019)

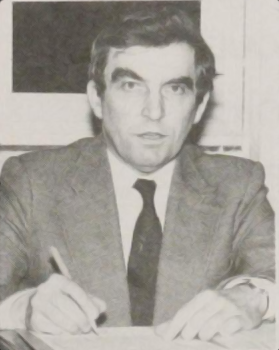
- François Autain,1981

Member of the Senate of France
- In office 25 September 1983 – 25 September 2011
- Prime Minister: Pierre Mauroy
- Parliamentary group: Communist, Republican, Citizen and Ecologist group
- Constituency: Loire-Atlantique department

Deputy in the National Assembly
- In office 3 April 1978 – 24 July 1981
- Constituency: Loire-Atlantique's 3rd constituency

Secretary of State for Social Security
- In office 21 May 1981 – 22 June 1981
- President: François Mitterrand
- Preceded by: Jacques Barrot
- Succeeded by: office eliminated

Secretary of State for Immigration
- In office 23 June 1981 – 22 March 1983
- President: François Mitterrand
- Prime Minister: Pierre Mauroy
- Preceded by: new office
- Succeeded by: Georgina Dufoix

Secretary of State for Defense
- In office 23 March 1983 – 25 September 1983
- President: François Mitterrand
- Prime Minister: Pierre Mauroy
- Preceded by: new office
- Succeeded by: Jean Gatel

Personal details
- Born: 16 June 1935 Luché-sur-Brioux (Deux-Sèvres)
- Died: 21 December 2019 (aged 84)
- Party: Unified Socialist Party (1971-1975); PS (1975-2001); Citizen and Republican Movement (2001-2008); Left Party (from 2008)

François Autain (16 June 1935 – 21 December 2019) was a French politician. Over his career, he was a member of the Communist, Republican, and Citizen Group and a member of the Left Party, prior to which he was a member of the Citizen and Republican Movement but also the PS and the PSU.

He was a member of the Senate of France, representing the Loire-Atlantique department from 1983 to 2011 and a deputy in the National Assembly from 1978 to 1981. From 1981 to 1983, he served as a secretary of state in the governments of Pierre Mauroy in the Ministry of Solidarity and Heath and the Ministry of Defense.

== Biography ==
François Autain was born on 16 June 1935 in the commune of Luché-sur-Brioux in the Deux-Sèvres department. He studied medicine in Nantes and became active in the Union Nationale des Étudiants de France during the Algerian War. He became a general practitioner in Bouguenais, a commune near Nantes. In 1968, he joined the Unified Socialist Party.

In 1971, he was elected as mayor of Bouguenais, a position that he held until 1993. He joined the Socialist Party in 1975 and won election to the National Assembly in the 1978 French legislative election. As a physician, he focused on health issues in the Assembly. After the victory of François Mitterrand in the 1981 French presidential election, Autain joined the government as a Secretary of State, or junior minister. He served in government until 1983, when he was elected as a Senator.

Autain served in the Senate until 2011, having been re-elected in 1992 and 2001. He was a secretary of the senate as well as a quaestor, a role that gave him access to government funds that he could distribute to mayors of communes. The party removed him from its official list in 2001; however, he was able to win re-election in the 2001 French Senate Election as a member of the Citizen and Republican Movement. He later left the Citizen and Republican Movement and joined the Left Party formed by Jean-Luc Mélenchon.

He did not stand as a candidate for re-election in 2011.

== Bibliography ==
- Page on the Senate website
