= Jean-Marc Ayrault =

Prime Minister of France from 2012 to 2014

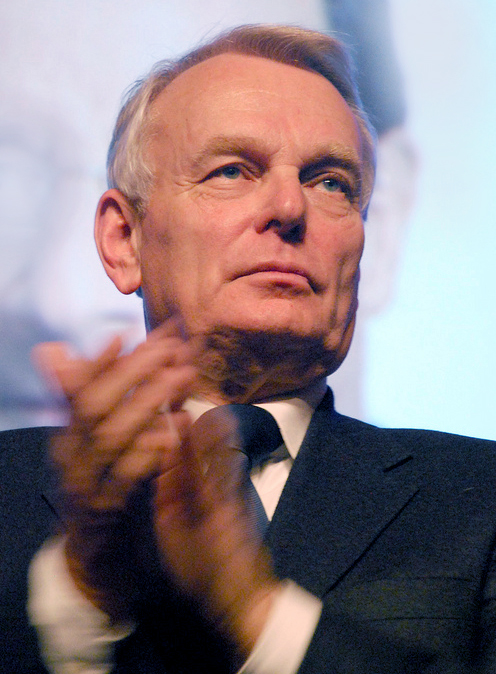
- Ayrault in 2012

Prime Minister of France
- In office 15 May 2012 – 31 March 2014
- President: François Hollande
- Preceded by: François Fillon
- Succeeded by: Manuel Valls

Minister of Foreign Affairs and International Development
- In office 11 February 2016 – 10 May 2017
- Prime Minister: Manuel Valls; Bernard Cazeneuve
- Preceded by: Laurent Fabius
- Succeeded by: Jean-Yves Le Drian (Europe and Foreign Affairs)

Leader of the Socialist group in the National Assembly
- In office 12 June 1997 – 19 June 2012
- Preceded by: Laurent Fabius
- Succeeded by: Bruno Le Roux

Mayor of Nantes
- In office 20 March 1989 – 21 June 2012
- Preceded by: Michel Chauty
- Succeeded by: Patrick Rimbert

Mayor of Saint-Herblain
- In office 14 March 1977 – 20 March 1989
- Preceded by: Michel Chauty
- Succeeded by: Charles Gautier

Member of the National Assembly for Loire-Atlantique's 3rd constituency
- In office 1 May 2014 – 12 March 2016
- Preceded by: Jean-Pierre Fougerat
- Succeeded by: Karine Daniel
- In office 23 June 1988 – 20 July 2012
- Preceded by: Proportional representation per department
- Succeeded by: Jean-Pierre Fougerat

Member of the National Assembly for Loire-Atlantique
- In office 2 April 1986 – 23 June 1988
- Preceded by: Jean-Pierre Fougerat
- Succeeded by: Jean-Pierre Fougerat

Personal details
- Born: Jean-Marc Joseph Marcel Ayrault; 25 January 1950 (age 76) Maulévrier, France
- Party: Socialist Party
- Spouse: Brigitte Terrien (m. 1971)
- Children: 2
- Education: University of Nantes

Jean-Marc Joseph Marcel Ayrault (French: [ʒɑ̃maʁk eʁo]; born 25 January 1950) is a French politician who served as Prime Minister of France from May 2012 to March 2014 under President François Hollande. He later was Minister of Foreign Affairs and International Development from 2016 to 2017. He previously was Mayor of Nantes from 1989 to 2012 and led the Socialist group in the National Assembly from 1997 to 2012. In 2022 he was named president of the Fondation Jean-Jaurès.

== Early life ==
Born in Maulévrier, Maine-et-Loire, Jean-Marc Ayrault is the son of Joseph Ayrault, from Maulévrier, formerly an agricultural worker who was subsequently employed in a textile factory, and of Georgette Uzenot, a former seamstress who later became a full-time housewife.

His early schooling was at the St Joseph Catholic primary school in Maulévrier, after which, between 1961 and 1968, he attended the Lycée Colbert, in Cholet. He subsequently studied German at the University of Nantes. In 1969/70 he spent a term at the University of Würzburg in Bavaria. He graduated with a degree in German in 1971 and in 1972 obtained his graduate teaching diploma. He stayed in the Nantes area for his probationary teaching year which was undertaken in Rezé. Between 1973 and his election to the National Assembly in 1986 he worked as a German language teacher in nearby Saint-Herblain.

== Political career ==
During his youth, Ayrault was a member of a movement of young Christians in rural areas. He joined the Socialist Party (PS) after the 1971 Epinay Congress during which François Mitterrand took the party leadership. Ayrault was affiliated to Jean Poperen's faction, one of the left-wing groups in the party. Elected in 1976 to the General Council of Loire-Atlantique département, he subsequently became Mayor of Saint-Herblain, located in the western suburbs of Nantes, in 1977. At 27, he was the youngest mayor of a French city of more than 30,000 inhabitants. He left the General Council in 1982.

He reached the PS national committee in 1979, then the executive of the party in 1981. He was first elected to the National Assembly in 1986, as representative of Loire Atlantique department, and he was consistently re-elected in subsequent elections. In 1989, he was chosen by the PS to conquer the mayoralty of Nantes, held by the Rally for the Republic (RPR) party, and he won. Re-elected in 1995, 2001 and 2008, he was also president of the Urban Community of Nantes Métropole since 2002. He was an important "local baron" of the Socialist Party.

After the surprising victory of the "Plural Left" in the 1997 legislative election, he was not appointed to the government but was instead designated as president of the Socialist parliamentary group in the National Assembly, a position he held for the next 15 years. Ayrault was a supporter of François Hollande during the Socialist Party's 2011 primary election to choose its presidential candidate. Hollande was ultimately elected president in the 2012 presidential election, and he appointed Ayrault as prime minister when he took office on 15 May 2012.

=== Prime Minister ===
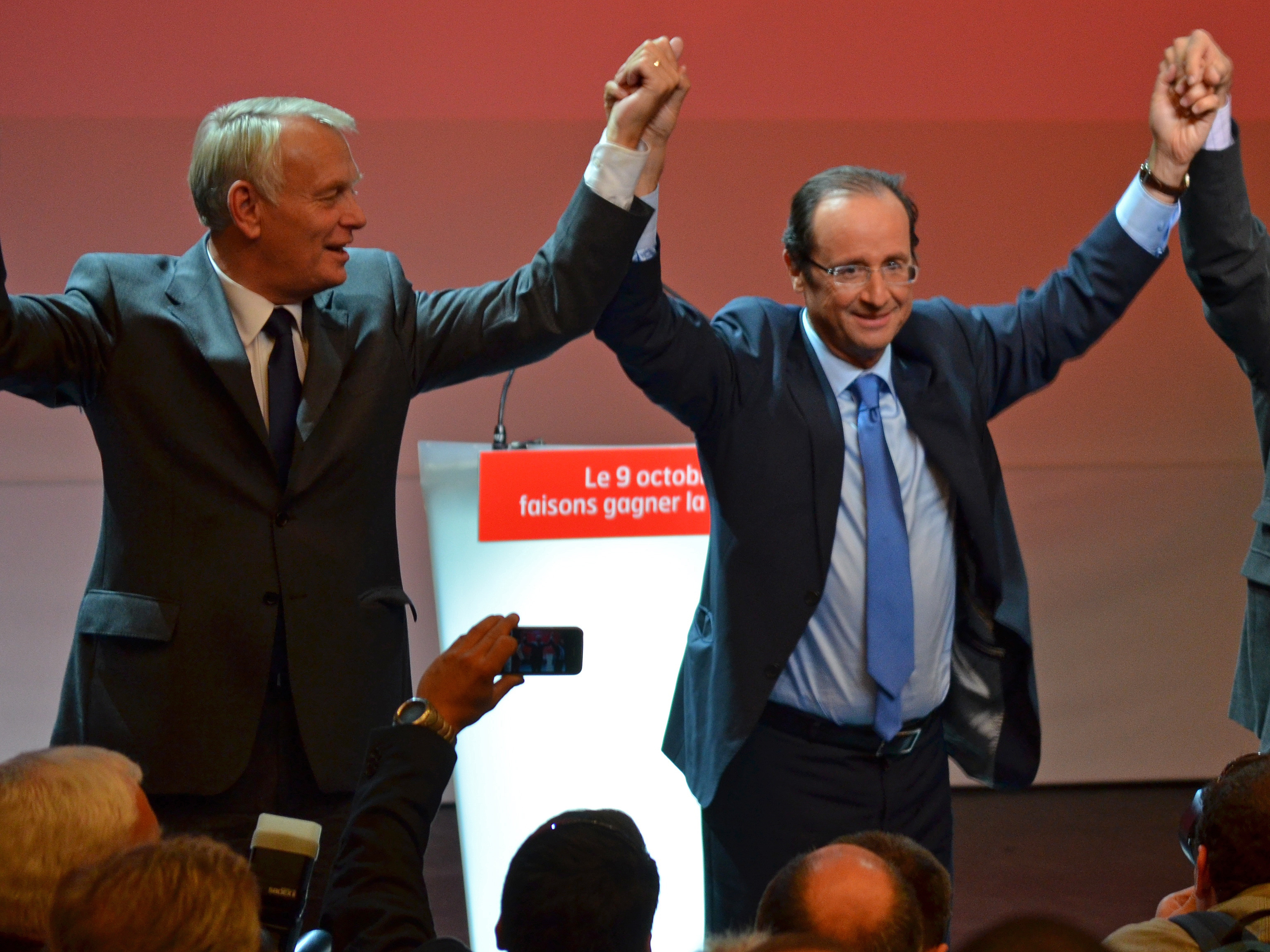
Ayrault during a meeting in his constituency in Nantes with François Hollande

Following François Hollande's victory in the 2012 presidential election, Ayrault was appointed Prime Minister of France replacing François Fillon. The following day, Ayrault unveiled his Cabinet. In response to the Greek government-debt crisis he asked the European Commission to put unused structural funds towards helping the Greek economy return to growth and said "We waited too long before helping Greece. This has been going on for two years now and only gets worse..." During his time in office, same-sex marriage was also legalized.

Ayrault's appointment to the country's head of government prompted discussion within Arabic language mass media as to how to pronounce his surname. When his name is pronounced properly in French, it sounds "very much like a moderately rude Lebanese [slang] term" for a phallus. Al-Arabiya decided to pronounce the name properly and write its Arabic transliteration "in a way that makes clear it is not the offensive word"; CNN Arabic decided to pronounce Ayrault's surname by "voicing the last two letters in the written word."

During his time in office, Ayrault and his ministers introduced a raft of progressive measures, including a reduction in the retirement age from 62 to 60 for some categories of workers, cuts in ministerial salaries of up to 30%, a rise in the minimum wage, the introduction of a 36-month rent freeze on new contracts in some urban areas, an extension of social rebates on energy, increased educational support for low-income families, the introduction of a system of subsidised employment for young people between 16 and 25, and the extension of an entitlement to free health care to an additional 500,000 people.

Ayrault resigned on 31 March 2014, the day after the "Socialists suffered heavy losses in nationwide municipal elections", and formally handed over to his successor Manuel Valls at the prime ministerial residence, the Hotel Matignon, on 1 April 2014.

=== Minister of Foreign Affairs ===
As part of a 2016 cabinet reshuffle, Hollande appointed Ayrault as foreign minister, replacing Laurent Fabius.

Under Ayrault's leadership, the French foreign ministry summoned Vincent Mertens de Wilmars, Belgium's ambassador in Paris, in September 2016 after detaining two Belgian police officers on French territory for allegedly depositing migrants across the countries' border.

In September 2016, Ayrault took part in the formal signing ceremony for the Hinkley Point C nuclear power station, a controversial $24-billion Franco-Chinese investment project.

== Other activities ==
On 12 November 2023, he took part in the March for the Republic and Against Antisemitism in Paris in response to the rise in antisemitism since the beginning of the Gaza war.

== Personal life ==
When President Hollande published a list of bank deposits and property held by all 38 ministers for first time 2012, Ayrault declared personal assets worth 1.5 million euros.

== Political resume ==
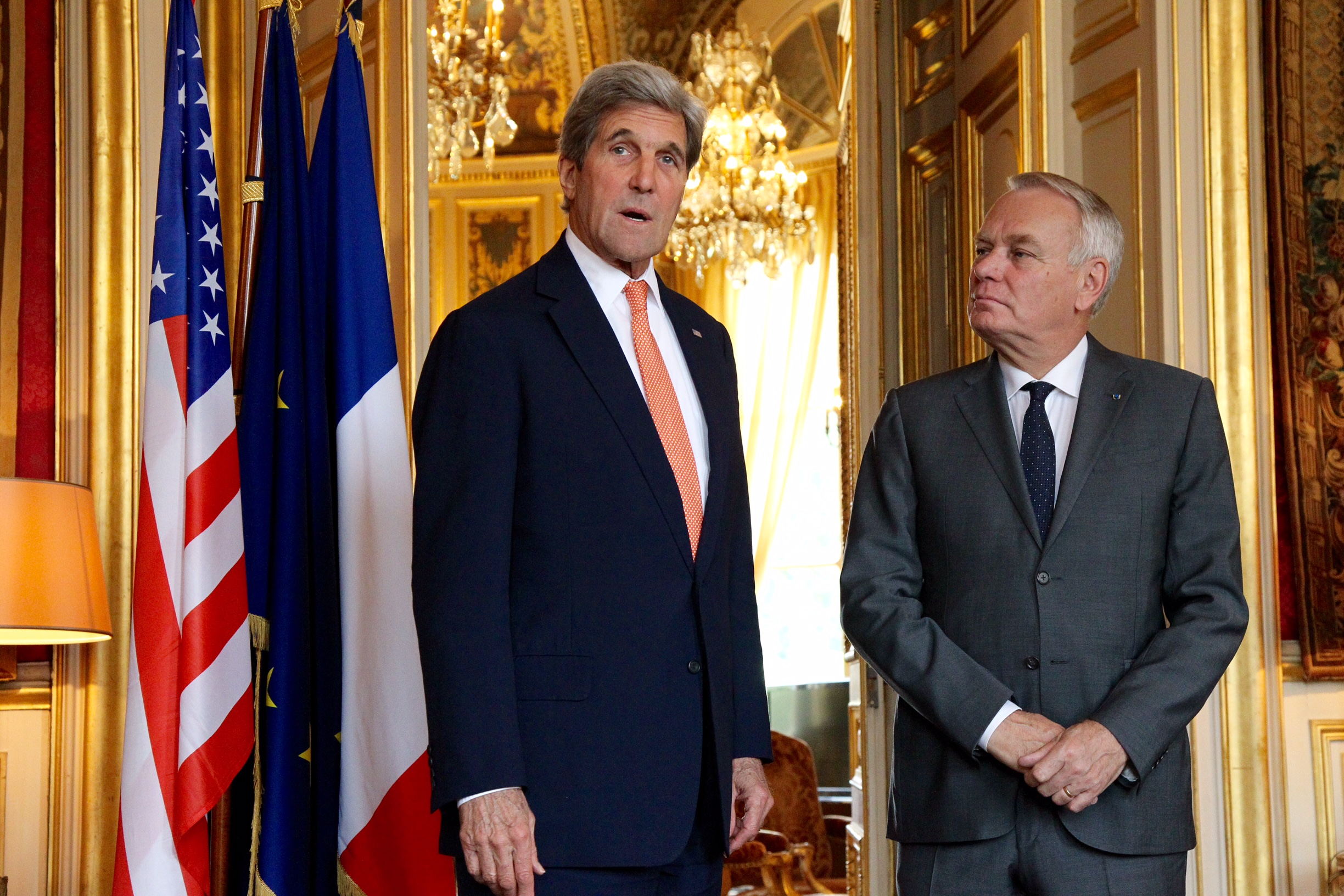
Ayrault with US Secretary of State John Kerry in Paris, 30 July 2016

French Government

- Prime Minister: 2012–2014.
- Minister of Foreign Affairs: 2016–2017

National Assembly

- President of the Socialist Group in the National Assembly of France: 1997–2012. Re-elected in 2002 and 2007.
- Member of the National Assembly of France for Loire-Atlantique (3rd constituency): 1986–2012 (appointed Prime Minister in 2012). Elected in 1986, re-elected in 1988, 1993, 1997, 2002, 2007, 2012.

General council

- General councillor of Loire-Atlantique, elected in the canton of Saint-Herbain-Est: 1976–1982.

Community Council

- Président of the Urban Community of Nantes Métropole: 1992–2012 (Resignation). Re-elected in 1995, 2001, and 2008.
- Member of the Urban Community Council of Nantes Métropole: since 1992. Re-elected in 1995, 2001, and 2008.

Municipal Council

- Mayor of Saint-Herblain: 1977–1989. Re-elected in 1983.
- Municipal councillor of Saint-Herblain: 1977–1989. Re-elected in 1983.
- Mayor of Nantes: 1989–2012 (Resignation). Re-elected in 1995, 2001, and 2008.
- Municipal councillor of Nantes: Since 1989. Re-elected in 1995, 2001 and 2008.

=== Honours ===
==== National honour ====
- France : Commandeur of the Legion of Honour (14 July 2019)
- France: Grand Cross of the Order of National Merit (28 November 2012)

==== Foreign honours ====
- Italy : Grand Cross of the Order of Merit of the Italian Republic (19 November 2012)
- Japan : Grand Cordon of the Order of the Rising Sun (3 November 2017)
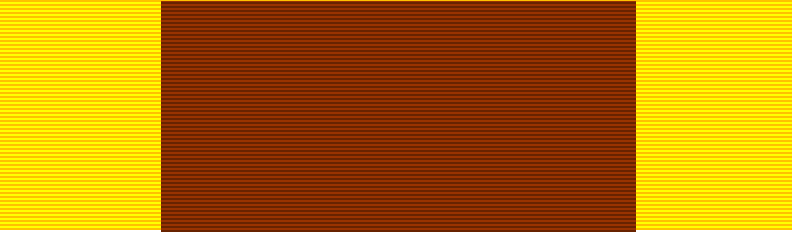
- Knight Grand Cross of the Order of the Knights of Rizal

== See also ==
- List of foreign ministers in 2017

Political offices
Preceded by Michel Chauty	Mayor of Saint-Herblain; 1977–1989	Succeeded by Charles Gautier
Preceded by Michel Chauty	Mayor of Nantes; 1989–2012	Succeeded by Patrick Rimbert
Preceded by François Fillon	Prime Minister of France; 2012–2014	Succeeded by Manuel Valls
Preceded by Laurent Fabius	Minister of Foreign Affairs; 2016–2017	Succeeded by Jean-Yves Le Drian
Order of precedence
Preceded by François Fillon as former Prime Minister	Order of precedence of France; Former Prime Minister	Succeeded by Manuel Valls as former Prime Minister
