= Monique Papon =

French politician

Monique Papon (5 October 1934 – 6 June 2018) was a French politician who was member of the Senate of France, representing the Loire-Atlantique department. She was a member of the Union for a Popular Movement; most recently she served as a vice-president of the Senate.

Papon was elected to the National Assembly from Loire-Atlantique between 1986 and 1997, successively affiliated with the Union for French Democracy, Centrist Union group, and the Union for a Popular Movement group. A member of the political bureau of the Union pour la démocratie française since 1995, she was elected senator September 2001, in second position on the list led by André Trillard. She rejoined the Union for a Popular Movement on that date. Defeated in her canton of Nantes in the elections of 2004, she carried out the function of secretary of the French Senate until October 2008, when she was elected vice president of the High Assembly.

In 2010, Papon was awarded an Order of Brilliant Star with Grand Cordon by President of the Republic of China Ma Ying-jeou. She received the Legion of Honour in 2012, as an officer of the order. Papon died on 6 June 2018.
