= List of by-elections to the National Assembly (France) =

This is an incomplete list of by-elections to the National Assembly of France. It includes all by-elections (French: élection partielles) to the National Assembly since 1997.

== List ==
=== 11th legislature (1997–2002) ===
Constituency	Date	Incumbent party	Winning candidate	Winning party	Result
Meurthe-et-Moselle's 4th constituency	7 December 1997; 14 December 1997	RPR	François Guillaume	RPR	
Haut-Rhin's 6th constituency	7 December 1997; 14 December 1997	UDF	Jean-Jacques Weber	UDF	
Landes's 3rd constituency	18 January 1998; 25 January 1998	PS	Joël Goyheneix	PS	
Moselle's 3rd constituency	25 January 1998; 1 February 1998	RPR	Marie-Jo Zimmermann	RPR	
Var's 1st constituency	26 April 1998; 1 May 1998	FN	Odette Casanova	PS	
Lot's 2nd constituency	31 May 1998; 7 June 1998	PS	Jean Launay	PS	
Bas-Rhin's 7th constituency	7 June 1998; 14 June 1998	UDF	Émile Blessig	UDF	
Nord's 13th constituency	20 September 1998; 27 September 1998	PS	Franck Dhersin	DL	
Bouches-du-Rhône's 9th constituency	20 September 1998; 27 September 1998	PCF	Alain Belviso	PCF	
Var's 1st constituency	20 September 1998; 27 September 1998	PS	Odette Casanova	PS	
Alpes Maritimes' 2nd constituency	22 November 1998; 29 November 1998	RPR	Jacqueline Mathieu-Obadia	RPR	
Eure's 3rd constituency	22 November 1998; 29 November 1998	DL	Hervé Morin	UDF	
Côte-d'Or's 2nd constituency	22 November 1998; 29 November 1998	RPR	Jean-Marc Nudant	RPR	
Bouches-du-Rhône's 9th constituency	21 March 1999; 28 March 1999	PCF	Bernard Deflesselles	RPR	
Paris's 21st constituency	28 November 1999; 5 December 1999	PS	Michel Charzat	PS	
Landes's 3rd constituency	30 January 2000; 6 February 2000	PS		PS	
Pyrénées-Atlantiques' 2nd constituency	12 March 2000; 19 March 2000	UDF	Pierre Menjucq	UDF	
Sarthe's 2nd constituency	12 March 2000; 19 March 2000	PS		PS	
Pas-de-Calais' 3rd constituency	12 March 2000; 19 March 2000				
Haut-Rhin's 6th constituency	18 June 2000; 25 June 2000	UDF	Francis Hillmeyer	UDF	
Territoire-de-Belfort's 2nd constituency	15 October 2000; 22 October 2000	MRC	Jean-Pierre Chevènement	MRC	
Seine-Maritime's 9th constituency	15 October 2000; 22 October 2000				
Haute-Garonne's 1st constituency	25 March 2001; 1 April 2001	UDF	Philippe Douste-Blazy	UDF	
Val d'Oise's 8th constituency	25 March 2001; 1 April 2001				
Alpes Maritimes' 8th constituency	25 March 2001; 1 April 2001	UDF	Bernard Brochand	RPR	

=== 12th legislature (2002–2007) ===
Constituency	Date	Incumbent party	Winning candidate	Winning party	Result
Nord's 23rd constituency	8 December 2002; 15 December 2002	UMP	Jean-Claude Decagny	UMP	MI
Yvelines' 3rd constituency	8 December 2002; 15 December 2002	UDF	Christian Blanc	UDF	MI
Paris' 17th constituency	26 January 2003; 2 February 2003	PS	Annick Lepetit	PS	MI
Val d'Oise's 5th constituency	26 January 2003; 2 February 2003	UMP	Georges Mothron	UMP	MI
Eure-et-Loir's 3rd constituency	16 March 2003; 23 March 2003	UMP	François Huwart	PRG	MI
Seine-Saint-Denis' 7th constituency	16 March 2003; 23 March 2003	CAP	Jean-Pierre Brard	CAP	MI
Gard's 5th constituency	13 June 2004; 20 June 2004	PS	William Dumas	PS	MI
Paris' 15th constituency	20 June 2004; 27 June 2004	UDF	Bernard Debré	UDF	MI
Haute-Loire's 1st constituency	27 June 2004; 4 July 2004	UMP	Laurent Wauquiez	UMP	MI
Gironde's 2nd constituency	14 November 2004; 21 November 2004	UMP	Hugues Martin	UMP	MI
Yvelines' 8th constituency	28 November 2004; 5 December 2004	UMP	Pierre Bédier	UMP	MI
Vendée's 4th constituency	23 January 2005; Won in the first round	MPF	Véronique Besse	MPF	MI
Hauts-de-Seine's 6th constituency	13 March 2005; Won in the first round	UMP	Nicolas Sarkozy	UMP	MI
Meurthe-et-Moselle's 1st constituency	4 September 2005; 11 September 2005	PRV	Laurent Hénart	PRV	MI
Nord's 4th constituency	11 September 2005; 18 September 2005	UMP	Marc-Philippe Daubresse	UMP	MI
Oise's 4th constituency	11 September 2005; 18 September 2005	UMP	Éric Woerth	UMP	MI
Val-de-Marne's 7th constituency	25 September 2005; 2 October 2005	UMP	Marie-Anne Montchamp	UMP	MI

=== 13th legislature (2007–2012) ===
Constituency	Date	Incumbent party	Winning candidate	Winning party	Result
Val d'Oise's 8th constituency	9 December 2007; 16 December 2007	PS	François Pupponi	PS	MI
Hauts-de-Seine's 12th constituency	27 January 2008; 3 February 2008	UMP	Jean-Pierre Schosteck	UMP	MI
Eure-et-Loir's 1st constituency	27 January 2008; 3 February 2008	UMP	Françoise Vallet	PS	MI
Vendée's 5th constituency	6 April 2008; Won in the first round	MPF	Dominique Souchet	MPF	MI
Alpes Maritimes' 5th constituency	18 May 2008; 25 May 2008	UMP	Christian Estrosi	UMP	MI
Rhône's 11th constituency	25 May 2008; 1 June 2008	UMP	Raymond Durand	UMP	MI
Eure-et-Loir's 1st constituency	7 September 2008; 14 September 2008	PS	Jean-Pierre Gorges	UMP	MI
Gironde's 8th constituency	23 November 2008; 30 November 2008	UMP	François Deluga	PS	MI
Marne's 1st constituency	7 December 2008; 14 December 2008	UMP	Arnaud Robinet	UMP	MI
Yvelines' 10th constituency	20 September 2009; 27 September 2009	UMP	Jean-Frédéric Poisson	UMP	MI
Yvelines' 12th constituency	11 October 2009; 18 October 2009	UMP	David Douillet	UMP	MI
Isère's 4th constituency	30 May 2010; 6 June 2010	PS	Marie-Noëlle Battistel	PS	
Yvelines' 10th constituency	4 July 2010; 11 July 2010	UMP	Anny Poursinoff	LV	MI

=== 14th legislature (2012–2017) ===
Constituency	Date	Incumbent party	Winning candidate	Winning party	Result
Val-de-Marne's 1st constituency	9 December 2012; 16 December 2012	UDI	Sylvain Berrios	DVD	MI
Hérault's 6th constituency	9 December 2012; 16 December 2012	PS	Élie Aboud	UMP	MI
Hauts-de-Seine's 13th constituency	9 December 2012; 16 December 2012	UMP	Patrick Devedjian	UMP	MI
Oise's 2nd constituency	17 March 2013; 24 March 2013	UMP	Jean-François Mancel	UMP	MI
Wallis and Futuna's 1st constituency	17 March 2013; 24 March 2013	DVD	Napole Polutele	DVD	MI
First constituency for French residents overseas	25 May 2013; 8 June 2013	PS	Frédéric Lefebvre	UMP	
Eighth constituency for French residents overseas	26 May 2013; 9 June 2013	PS	Meyer Habib	UDI	
Lot-et-Garonne's 3rd constituency	16 June 2013; 23 June 2013	PS	Jean-Louis Costes	UMP	
Haute-Garonne's 3rd constituency	25 May 2014; 1 June 2014	UMP	Laurence Arribagé	UMP	
French Polynesia's 1st constituency	14 June 2014; 28 June 2014	Tahoeraa Huiraatira	Maina Sage	Tahoeraa Huiraatira	
Nord's 21st constituency	22 June 2014; 29 June 2014	UDI	Laurent Degallaix	UDI	
Saint-Pierre-et-Miquelon's 1st constituency	29 June 2014; Won in the first round	PRG	Annick Girardin	PRG	
Aube's 3rd constituency	7 December 2014; 14 December 2014	UMP	Gérard Menuel	UMP	
Doubs' 4th constituency	1 February 2015; 8 February 2015	PS	Frédéric Barbier	PS	
Aveyron's 3rd constituency	6 September 2015; 13 September 2015	LR	Arnaud Viala	LR	
Aisne's 2nd constituency	13 March 2016; 20 March 2016	LR	Julien Dive	LR	
Yvelines' 2nd constituency	13 March 2016; 20 March 2016	LR	Pascal Thévenot	LR	
Nord's 10th constituency	13 March 2016; 20 March 2016	LR	Vincent Ledoux	LR	
Loire-Atlantique's 3rd constituency	17 April 2016; 24 April 2016	PS	Karine Daniel	PS	
Bas-Rhin's 1st constituency	22 May 2016; 29 May 2016	PS	Éric Elkouby	PS	
Alpes Maritimes' 5th constituency	22 May 2016; 29 May 2016	LR	Marine Brenier	LR	
Ain's 3rd constituency	5 June 2016; 12 June 2016	LR	Stéphanie Pernod-Beaudon	LR	

=== 15th legislature (2017–2022) ===
Dates	Constituency	Incumbent deputy	Party	Group	Elected deputy	Party	Reason for by-election	Ref(s)
28 Jan and 4 Feb 2018	Val-d'Oise's 1st	Isabelle Muller-Quoy	REM	REM	Antoine Savignat	LR	Election invalidated by the Constitutional Council	
28 Jan and 4 Feb 2018	Territoire de Belfort's 1st	Ian Boucard	LR	LR	Ian Boucard	LR	Election invalidated by the Constitutional Council	
4 Mar and 11 Mar 2018	French Guiana's 2nd	Lénaïck Adam	REM	REM	Lénaïck Adam	REM	Election invalidated by the Constitutional Council	
11 Mar and 18 Mar 2018	Haute-Garonne's 8th	Joël Aviragnet	PS	NG	Joël Aviragnet	PS	Election invalidated by the Constitutional Council	
18 Mar and 25 Mar 2018	Loiret's 4th	Jean-Pierre Door	LR	LR	Jean-Pierre Door	LR	Election invalidated by the Constitutional Council	
18 Mar and 25 Mar 2018	Mayotte's 1st	Ramlati Ali	PS	REM	Ramlati Ali	DVG	Election invalidated by the Constitutional Council	
8 Apr and 22 Apr 2018	French residents overseas' 5th	Samantha Cazebonne	REM	REM	Samantha Cazebonne	REM	Election invalidated by the Constitutional Council	
15 Apr 2018	Wallis and Futuna's 1st	Napole Polutele	DVG	UAI app.	Sylvain Brial	DVG	Election invalidated by the Constitutional Council	
23 Sep and 30 Sep 2018	Réunion's 7th	Thierry Robert	MoDem	MoDem	Jean-Luc Poudroux	DVD	Declared ineligible by the Constitutional Council	
18 Nov and 25 Nov 2018	Essonne's 1st	Manuel Valls	DVG	REM	Francis Chouat	DVG	Resignation	
20 and 27 Sep 2020	Seine-Maritime's 5th	Christophe Bouillon	PS	SOC	Gérard Leseul	PS	Cumulation of mandates	
20 and 27 Sep 2020	Val-de-Marne's 9th	Luc Carvounas	PS	SOC	Isabelle Santiago	PS	Cumulation of mandates	
20 and 27 Sep 2020	Yvelines's 11th	Nadia Hai	REM	REM	Philippe Benassaya	LR	Resignation	
20 and 27 Sep 2020	Réunion's 2nd	Huguette Bello	PLR	GDR	Karine Lebon	PLR	Cumulation of mandates	
20 and 27 Sep 2020	Haut-Rhin's 1st	Éric Straumann	LR	LR	Yves Hemedinger	LR	Cumulation of mandates	
20 and 27 Sep 2020	Maine-et-Loire's 3rd	Jean-Charles Taugourdeau	LR	LR	Anne-Laure Blin	LR	Cumulation of mandates	
30 May and 6 Jun 2021	Pas-de-Calais's 6th	Brigitte Bourguignon	REM	REM	Brigitte Bourguignon	REM	Cumulation of mandates	
30 May and 6 Jun 2021	Paris's 15th constituency	George Pau-Langevin	PS	SOC	Lamia El Aaraje	PS	Resignation	
30 May and 6 Jun 2021	Indre-et-Loire's 3rd constituency	Sophie Auconie	UDI	UDI	Sophie Métadier	UDI	Resignation	
30 May and 6 Jun 2021	Oise's 1st constituency	Olivier Dassault	LR	LR	Victor Habert-Dassault	LR	Death in a helicopter crash	

=== 16th legislature (2022–2024) ===
Dates	Constituency	Incumbent deputy	Party	Elected deputy	Party	Reason for by-election	Ref(s)
2 and 9 October 2022	Yvelines's 2nd constituency	Jean-Noel Barrot	MoDem	Jean-Noel Barrot	MoDem	Resignation due to ineligibility	
22 and 29 Jan 2023	Pas-de-Calais's 8th constituency	Bertrand Petit	PS	Bertrand Petit	PS	Declared ineligible by the Constitutional Council	
22 and 29 Jan 2023	Marne's 2nd constituency	Anne-Sophie Frigout	RN	Laure Miller	RE	Declared ineligible by the Constitutional Council	
22 and 29 Jan 2023	Charente's 1st constituency	Thomas Mesnier	H	Rene Pilato	LFI	Declared ineligible by the Constitutional Council	
26 March 15 April 2023	Ariège's 1st constituency	Benedict Taurine	LFI	Martine Froger	PS	Declared ineligible by the Constitutional Council	
1 and 15 April 2023	Second constituency for French residents overseas	Éléonore Caroit	RE	Éléonore Caroit	RE	Declared ineligible by the Constitutional Council	
2 and 16 April 2023	Eighth constituency for French residents overseas	Meyer Habib	UDI	Meyer Habib	UDI	Declared ineligible by the Constitutional Council	
2 and 16 April 2023	Ninth constituency for French residents overseas	Karim Ben Cheikh	G.s	Karim Ben Cheikh	G.s	Declared ineligible by the Constitutional Council	
