= List of senators of Wallis and Futuna =

Location of Wallis and Futuna

Following is a List of senators of Wallis and Futuna, people who have represented the collectivity of Wallis and Futuna in the Senate of France.

== Background ==
Wallis has 13 seats and Futuna has seven, which form 20 seats in the territory. The government of Wallis and Futuna elects one senator by the results of the electoral college's absolute majority vote.

== List ==
Term		Senator	Group	Ref.
September 1962	September 1971	Henry Loste	Independent Republicans	
September 1971	April 1998	Soséfo Makapé Papilio (died)	Rally for the Republic (RPR)	
April 1998	September 1998	Basile Tui, replacing Sosefo Makapé Papilio	Centrist Union group	
September 1998	September 2020	Robert Laufoaulu, reelected in September 2008 and September 2014.	UMP then Les Républicains	
September 2020	Incumbent	Mikaele Kulimoetoke	RDPI	
