= 2012 Wallis and Futuna Territorial Assembly election =

Territorial Assembly elections were held in Wallis and Futuna on 25 March 2012. Thirty party lists contested to fill the twenty seats. The major election issues were the cost of living, economic development, and Wallis and Futuna's relationship with France. Turnout was 85.95%.

Only nine incumbents were re-elected. Among those to be defeated was Victor Brial, a former member of the French National Assembly, and Assembly President Siliako Lauhea.

Following the election the Territorial Assembly for the first time elected a Socialist, Vetelino Nau, as President of the assembly by 11 votes to 9. Mikaele Kulimoetoke was elected as vice-president, and Petelo Hanisi as president of the standing committee.

== Elected members ==
| Constituency | Member | Party |
|---|---|---|
| Hihifo District | Nivaleta Iloai | Union pour Wallis et Futuna |
| Hihifo District | Atoloto Kolokilagi | UMP |
| Hihifo District | Sosefo Suve | Independent |
| Hahake District | David Vergé | Independent |
| Hahake District | Mikaele Kulimoetoke | Independent |
| Hahake District | Patalione Kanimoa | UMP |
| Hahake District | Petelo Hanisi | Independent |
| Mua District | Laufilitoga Mireille | |
| Mua District | Emile Selui | |
| Mua District | Yannick Filau | UMP |
| Mua District | Munipoese Muli’aka’aka | |
| Mua District | Bernard Taufana | |
| Mua District | Eselone Ikai | Party |
| Alo District | Toma Savea | UMP |
| Alo District | Sosefo Motuku | Independent |
| Alo District | Alesio Katoa | Independent |
| Alo District | Vetelino Nau | UPWF |
| Sigave | Petelo Falelavaki | Independent |
| Sigave | Savelina Vea | Independent |
| Sigave | Pasikale Niutoua | |
