= 2017 Wallis and Futuna Territorial Assembly election =

Elections to the Territorial Assembly of Wallis and Futuna were held on 26 March 2017.

== Results ==
Voter turnout was reportedly higher than in 2012.

Hihifo
Party	Votes	%	Seats	Elected
Fakatahi kihe kaha'u e lelei / Ensemble pour un avenir meilleur	371	33.36	1	Soane Paulo Mailagi
Fakatahi'aga o hihifo	346	31.12	1	Nivaleta Iloai
Vaka aefa - Les Républicains	238	21.40	1	Atoloto Kolokilagi
Taumua lelei	157	14.12	0	
Total	1,112	100.00	3	
Valid votes	1,112	98.93		
Invalid votes	4	0.36		
Blank votes	8	0.71		
Total votes	1,124	100.00		
Registered voters/turnout	1,293	86.93		
Source: Government of Wallis and Futuna

Hahake
Party	Votes	%	Seats	Elected
Taofi ma'u pea sio mama'o	529	25.58	1	Atelea Vaitootai
Ta'ofi ki uvea mo Futuna	414	20.02	1	Mikaele Kulimoetoke
Wallis et Futuna ensemble	398	19.25	1	David Vergé
Le'o o tupulaga / Voix de la jeunesse	387	18.71	1	Lavinia Tagane
Haofaki tou fenua to tou ateaina	308	14.89	0	
Les républicains	32	1.55	0	
Total	2,068	100.00	4	
Valid votes	2,068	99.04		
Invalid votes	14	0.67		
Blank votes	6	0.29		
Total votes	2,088	100.00		
Registered voters/turnout	2,381	87.69		
Source: Government of Wallis and Futuna

Mua
Party	Votes	%	Seats	Elected
Fia gaue fakatahi kihe kaha'u e lelei	414	20.69	2	Napole Polutele, Marie Louise Selui
Uvea mo Futuna ke lelei	322	16.09	1	Mikaele Seo
Laga fenua	304	15.19	1	Yannick Feleu
Ta'ofi kite lelei fakatahi	291	14.54	1	Mireille Laufilitoga
Ofa ki tou fenua	267	13.34	1	Munipoese Muli’aka’aka
Fakatahi la	170	8.50	0	
Sio ki mua	141	7.05	0	
Fakatahi'aga ote laga fenua	92	4.60	0	
Total	2,001	100.00	6	
Valid votes	2,001	99.26		
Invalid votes	9	0.45		
Blank votes	6	0.30		
Total votes	2,016	100.00		
Registered voters/turnout	2,345	85.97		
Source: Government of Wallis and Futuna

Alo
Party	Votes	%	Seats	Elected
Travail et partage	301	21.94	1	Frédéric Baudry
Fa'u ile alofa	294	21.43	1	Lafaele Tukumuli
Mauli fakatasi / Ensemble pour le développement	273	19.90	1	Toma Savea
Lou fenua laga fakatasi	240	17.49	1	Sosefo Motuku
Mauli fakatasi	130	9.48	0	
Union pour la vie du peuple de Futuna	89	6.49	0	
Futuna tu'u ala' ala	45	3.28	0	
Total	1,372	100.00	4	
Valid votes	1,372	99.06		
Invalid votes	3	0.22		
Blank votes	10	0.72		
Total votes	1,385	100.00		
Registered voters/turnout	1,479	93.64		
Source: Government of Wallis and Futuna

Sigave
Party	Votes	%	Seats	Elected
Futuna fakatasi ke fetogi / Futuna ensemble	215	24.57	1	Sylvain Brial
Fakatasi ki le tou ka'au	175	20.00	1	Tuliano Talomafaia
Alofa maoki ki lou fenua	146	16.69	1	Savelina Vea
Malama fo'ou	131	14.97	0	
Fetokoi ari ki le apogipogi o lou fenua	121	13.83	0	
Puipui lou aga'i fenua	87	9.94	0	
Total	875	100.00	3	
Valid votes	875	99.77		
Invalid votes	0	0.00		
Blank votes	2	0.23		
Total votes	877	100.00		
Registered voters/turnout	940	93.30		
Source: Government of Wallis and Futuna
