= Mireille Laufilitoga =

Politician from Wallis and Futuna

Member of the Wallis and Futuna Territorial Assembly for Mua
- In office March 25, 2012 – 2022

Personal details
- Political party: Independent

Mireille Laufilitoga is a politician from Wallis and Futuna. She became a member of the Territorial Assembly of Wallis and Futuna in 2012, serving as president of the Permanent Committee from 2017 to 2022. An independent, she represented the Mua District until 2022.

== Political career ==
Mireille Laufilitoga was elected for her first five-year term as a member of the Territorial Assembly of Wallis and Futuna in 2012. She represents the Mua District on Wallis as an independent candidate. She was reelected in the 2017 Wallis and Futuna Territorial Assembly election, but she was not reelected in 2022.

During her time in the Assembly, she served on various committees including the financial, regional integration, agriculture, and women's issues committees. From 2017 to 2022, she served as president of the Permanent Committee.

Laufilitoga ran as an alternate candidate for Robert Laufoaulu and David Vergé, respectively, to represent Wallis and Futuna in the French Senate in 2014 and 2020.

== Other ==
Laufilitoga is also known as a singer. In 2007, she released the album Nuanua with her cousin, the Wallisian singer Sosefo Tukumuli.
