= 2002 Wallis and Futuna Territorial Assembly election =

← 1997	10 March 2002	2007 →
- All 21 seats in the Territorial Assembly; 11 seats needed for a majority
Party	Leader	Seats
RPR–LVPWF	Patalione Kanimoa	13
PS–UPWF	Albert Likuvalu	8
This lists parties that won seats. See the complete results below.
President before	President after
Patalione Kanimoa; LVPWF	Patalione Kanimoa; LVPWF

Legislative elections for the Territorial Assembly were held in Wallis and Futuna on 10 March 2002. 32 lists contested the vote. The result was a victory for the coalition of Rally for the Republic and Voice of the Wallis and Futuna Peoples, which won 13 of the 20 seats. Following the election Patalione Kanimoa was re-elected as President of the Territorial Assembly by 12 votes to 7, with one member absent due to illness.

== Results ==
Party	Seats
RPR–LVPWF	13
PS–UPWF	8
Total	21
Source: Le Monde
