= 1987 Wallis and Futuna Territorial Assembly election =

Territorial Assembly elections were held in Wallis and Futuna on 15 March 1987 to elect the twenty members of the Territorial Assembly of Wallis and Futuna. The Rally for the Republic won only 7 seats, but formed a coalition with the Local People's Union (UPL).

Following the election, Falakiko Gata was elected President of the Assembly, defeating Basile Tui by 13 votes to 7.
