= 1997 Wallis and Futuna Territorial Assembly election =

Territorial Assembly elections were held in Wallis and Futuna on 15 March 1997. 34 lists competed for the twenty seats in the Territorial Assembly of Wallis and Futuna. Assembly president Keleto Lakalaka was not re-elected.

Elections in four of the five constituencies were later annulled by the French Constitutional Council, with only Sigave's results withstanding scrutiny.

== Elected members ==
Constituency	Member	Party
Hihifo District	Make Pilioko	
Hihifo District	Soane Uhila	RPR
Hihifo District	Mikaele Tauhavili	
Hahake District	Setefano Hanisi	
Hahake District	Pesamino Taputai	
Hahake District	Patalione Kanimoa	
Hahake District	Clovis Logologofolau	RPR
Mua District	Siliako Lauhea	
Mua District	Iletefoso Tokavahua	
Mua District	Petelo Mafutuna	
Mua District	S.P. Ulutuipalelei	
Mua District	Napole Muliloto	
Mua District	Seleone Amole	
Alo District	Setefano Takaniko	
Alo District	Fiteli Mani	
Alo District	Malino Masei	
Alo District	Toma Savea	
Sigave	Victor Brial	Gaulliste RPR
Sigave	Pasikale Niutoua	
Sigave	Michel Lataiuvea	Gaulliste RPR
