= Benjamin Brial =

Wallisian politician

Member of the French National Assembly for Wallis and Futuna's constituency
- In office 3 April 1967 – 23 November 1988
- Preceded by: Hervé Loste
- Succeeded by: Kamilo Gata

Personal details
- Born: 9 June 1923 Mata Utu, Wallis and Futuna
- Died: 12 November 2004 (aged 81) Mala'e, Wallis and Futuna
- Party: Union of Democrats for the Republic; Rally for the Republic

Benjamin Brial (9 June 1923 – 12 November 2004) was a Wallisian politician who represented Wallis and Futuna in the French National Assembly from 1967 to 1988 as part of the Union of Democrats for the Republic and then the Rally for the Republic. He was a member of the Brial family, involved in trade and politics in Wallis and Futuna.

== Early life ==
Brial was born in Mata Utu and is from a prominent political family. His father was Julien Brial, a merchant from the Pyrénées-Orientales, and his mother was Aloisia Brial, Lavelua (queen) of Uvéa from 1954 to 1958. His brothers were Emmanuel-Victor Brial, manager of the Ballande establishments in New Caledonia, and politician Cyprien Brial, who served in the Territorial Assembly of Wallis and Futuna from 1967 to 1987. He was the uncle of politicians Julien Brial, Victor Brial and Sylvain Brial, who succeeded him in politics in Wallis and Futuna at different times, and the great-uncle of New Caledonian politician Gil Brial.

In 1933, his father sold his business and moved to Nouméa. During World War II his brothers Victor-Emmanuel and Jean Brial joined the Free French Forces in 1941 from New Caledonia. Brial, still a minor at 19 years old, had his papers falsified and joined the Free French Forces in 1942. He boarded the sloop ''Chevreuil'' and joined the Fusiliers marins.

In 1953, during the royal succession crisis in Wallis, Benjamin Brial applied for the title of Lavelua, but the administration of New Caledonia refused to allow a French citizen to become customary king. As a result his mother, Aloisia Brial, was chosen to become sovereign.

== Political career ==
Benjamin Brial was MP for Wallis and Futuna from 1967 to 1988. A Gaullist, he was attached to the Union of Democrats for the Republic, which became the Rally for the Republic in 1976. He won the legislative election of 1967 by winning against Hervé Loste. He was re-elected in July 1968 and April 1973.

He was re-elected in the first round during the legislative elections of 1978 and 1979 against his only competitor from the UDF, Father Petelo Falelavaki. He then became a divisive figure in the politics of Wallis and Futuna, rallying the opposition, including the UDF, against him. In 1981, he retained his seat against the UDF and three other candidates. During the 1986 French legislative election, the opposition of the UDF was divided between two candidates; the three-way contest allowed Brial to retain his seat as deputy.

During the 1988 French legislative election he won narrowly over Kamilo Gata, a former RPR political adviser "disappointed by the immobility of his original party". Due to the fragmentation of the opposition between Gata, UDF candidate Basile Tui and the socialist candidate Joseph Maisueche, Brial won the election with 52.18% of the votes in the second round. However, the election result was subsequently overturned by the Constitutional Council. Gata won the subsequent by-election. Brial retired from political life and resigned from his post as territorial councillor.

He died in November 2004.
