= Vetelino Nau =

Wallisian politician

President of the Territorial Assembly of Wallis and Futuna
- In office 4 April 2012 – 28 November 2012
- Preceded by: Pesamino Taputai
- Succeeded by: Sosefo Suve

Personal details
- Party: People's Union for Wallis and Futuna

Vetelino Nau is a Wallisian politician and former member of the Territorial Assembly of Wallis and Futuna, where he was first elected in 1997. Founder of the People's Union for Wallis and Futuna, he held the position of President of the Territorial Assembly from April to November 2012, marking the first time a socialist was chosen for the position. He ran for French Senate in 2008 and 2014, losing to Robert Laufoaulu both times.

== Early life ==
Nau is from Alo in Futuna and was a schoolteacher before entering politics.

== Career ==
Nau was first elected to the Territorial Assembly in the 1997 election. In 2002 he was a founder of the People's Union for Wallis and Futuna (UPFW). He contested Wallis and Futuna's senate seat in the 2008 French Senate election, losing to Robert Laufoaulu by 8 votes to 13.

He was re-elected to the Territorial Assembly at the April 2012 election. Shortly after, he was elected as president of the assembly, receiving 11 out of 20 votes. The election marked a change in leadership, as the Territorial Assembly of Wallis and Futuna had previously been led by a right wing and centrist coalition. With Nau's election with support from an alliance of socialists and newly elected independent legislators, he became the first socialist to hold the position. He was replaced by Sosefo Suve – an independent candidate who was also a former schoolteacher – in a November 2012 election.

He contested the 2014 French Senate election, but again lost to Robert Laufoaulu, this time by 7 votes to 15. Following the election he failed to present accounts of his campaign expenses, and was barred from office for a year.
