= Soséfo Makapé Papilio =

Futunan politician (1928–1998)

Senator for Wallis and Futuna
- In office September 1971 – 5 April 1998
- Preceded by: Henry Loste
- Succeeded by: Basile Tui

President of the Territorial Assembly of Wallis and Futuna
- In office 1967–1971
- Preceded by: Paino Tu'ugahala
- Succeeded by: Mikaele Folaumahina

Personal details
- Born: 27 February 1928 Alo, Wallis and Futuna
- Died: 5 April 1998 (aged 70) Alo, Wallis and Futuna
- Party: UDR (until 1976); RPR (after 1976)
- Profession: Politician

Soséfo Makapé Papilio (27 February 1928 – 5 April 1998) was a Futunan politician who served as President of the Territorial Assembly of Wallis and Futuna from 1967 to 1971 and as a member of the French Senate for Wallis and Futuna from 1971 until his death in 1998.

== Biography ==
Papilio was born on 27 February 1928 in Alo, Wallis and Futuna. His father, Talae Papilio, was a king of Alo. He studied at the Lano seminary and later volunteered for the French Army in 1949, serving in New Caledonia and receiving a promotion to sergeant in 1951, which made him the first non-commissioned officer in the French Army from Wallis and Futuna. He was discharged in 1956, having received the rank of sergeant major, and then began working in the trade business in Wallis and Futuna. He was also the president for the Association of Former Soldiers and Combatants of Wallis and Futuna starting in 1965.

After his discharge, Papilio also entered politics. He served as a member of the Wallis and Futuna board of directors from 1958 to 1961, then was re-elected in 1967 and 1972. He attended the South Pacific Conference in 1959 and 1962 and then was elected to the Territorial Assembly of Wallis and Futuna in 1962, later serving as its president from 1967 to 1971. He remained a member of the territorial assembly until 1990, except from 1977 to 1982.

In 1971, Papilio ran for election to the French Senate as a member of the Union of Democrats for the Republic (UDR) French ruling party, being elected by the territorial assembly with 11 votes compared to nine received by his opponent. Later a member of the Rally for the Republic (RPR) when it replaced the UDR, he was re-elected in 1980 (receiving 12/21 votes) and in 1989 (receiving 13/21 votes). In his tenure in the Senate, Papilio served as a member of the Cultural Affairs Committee from 1971 to 1996 and later as a member of the Social Affairs Committee. His main focus was on issues affecting Wallis and Futuna.

In the Senate, Papilio supported Wallis and Futuna remaining a territory of France but hoped for local traditions to continue, with him requesting in 1980 for funding given to local chiefs to be increased. Hoping for his islands to escape "total dependence on the mainland," he promoted tourism and exports of crafts in the territory. He showed an interest in the territory's education system and made efforts to improve it in his service as Senator. He also was interested in sports, serving as the president of his territory's athletics league and football league and often speaking in the Senate on the subject. Additionally, he was involved in laws relating to the territory of New Caledonia.

Papilio was a Knight of the Ordre national du Mérite (National Order of Merit). He was found dead on 5 April 1998, inside his car which was submerged underwater nearby a wharf. He was aged 70 at the time of his death. After his death, stamps were issued of Papilio in Wallis and Futuna. With a tenure of 27 years, he remains the longest-serving Senator in his territory's history.
