= Wallis and Futuna's constituency =

Constituency of the National Assembly of France

Constituency of Wallis and Futuna
- inline Constituency of the National Assembly of France

- Deputy: Mikaele Seo; RE
- Department: Wallis and Futuna
- Cantons: Alo, Sigave, Uvea

The constituency of Wallis and Futuna is a French legislative constituency covering the whole of the overseas collectivity of Wallis and Futuna. It is represented in the XVIth legislature by Mikaele Seo of Renaissance who defeated fellow centrist Etuato Mulikihaamea in the 2022 election.

== Deputies ==
Election	Member	Party
1988	Benjamin Brial	RPR
1993	Kamilo Gata	PRG
1997	Victor Brial	RPR
2002	Victor Brial	UMP
2007	Albert Likuvalu	PRG
2012	David Vergé	SE
2013	Napole Polutele	SE
2017	Napole Polutele	SE
2018	Sylvain Brial	SE
2022	Mikaele Seo	RE
2024	Mikaele Seo	RE

== Election results ==
=== 2024 ===
Candidate	Party	Alliance	First round	
Candidate	Party	Alliance	Votes	%
Mikaele Seo	RE	Ensemble	4,281	62.25
Lavinia Kanimoa Née Tagane	DVD		1,248	18.15
Lauriane Dominika Tialetagi Vergé	DVC		1,028	14.95
Otilone Tokotuu	DIV		320	4.65
Valid votes			6,877	100.00
Blank votes			49	0.70
Null votes			38	0.55
Turnout			6,964	77.11
Abstentions			2,067	22.89
Registered voters			9,031	
Result			RE HOLD	

=== 2022 ===
Legislative election 2022: Wallis and Futuna
Party	Candidate	Votes	%	±%
LREM	Mikaele Seo	1,622	21.80	N/A
Independent	Etuato Mulikihaamea	1,396	18.76	N/A
HOR	Soane Paulo Mailagi	1,170	15.73	N/A
Independent	Tamaseno Tukumuli	1,061	14.26	N/A
Independent	Malia Nive Kulikovi	922	12.39	N/A
Independent	Sandrine Aimée Ugatai	766	10.30	N/A
Independent	Lauriane Vergé	503	6.76	N/A
Turnout		7,440	78.22	−3.05
2nd round result
LREM	Mikaele Seo	3,717	50.11	N/A
Independent	Etuato Mulikihaamea	3,701	49.89	n/a
Turnout		7,418	78.46	−2.81
LREM gain from Independent				

=== 2018 by-election ===
Napole Polutele's 2017 election was invalidated and a by-election held in 2018. Only the first round of the election was required.

Candidate	Party	First round		
Candidate	Party	Votes	%	+/–
Sylvain Brial	SE	3,656	51.61	+5.42
Napole Polutele	SE	3,428	48.39	–1.85
Votes		7,084	100.00	–
Valid votes		7,084	99.45	+0.22
Blank votes		20	0.28	–0.17
Null votes		19	0.27	–0.05
Turnout		7,123	83.02	+1.75
Abstentions		1,457	16.98	–1.75
Registered voters		8,580		
Source: Préfecture de Wallis et Futuna

=== 2017 ===
Legislative election 2017: Wallis and Futuna — 1st round
Party	Candidate	Votes	%	±%
Independent	Napole Polutele	3,436	50.24	+12.84
Independent	Sylvain Brial	3,159	46.19	n/a
LR	Hervé Michel Delord	244	3.57	n/a
Turnout		6,839	80.65	+4.95
Independent hold		Swing	+1,1	

Napole Polutele obtained sufficient votes to be elected in the first round. Note, this election was later invalidated, leading to the 2018 by-election

=== 2013 by-election ===
David Vergé's 2012 election was annulled due to financial irregularities, causing a by-election on 17 and 24 March 2013. Two candidates stood for the left, including Laurianne Vergé for the Socialists. She was the first woman ever to stand as a candidate for Parliament to represent the constituency – and was the wife of David Vergé, who had represented the other side of the political spectrum. Seeking to retain the seat for the right, Napole Polutele stood as an independent endorsed by the Union for a Popular Movement.

All three candidates received good enough results to advance to the second round, where Polutele received almost exactly the same result as in the first and was elected. Two months later, having been elected to sit on the opposition benches (albeit officially as an independent), he joined the ranks of the Socialist-led majority. He explained frankly that being a member of the majority would make it easier for him to lobby the government for funds and services for his constituents – who, he said, cared little for the left-right divide prevalent in metropolitan France. He subsequently sat as an independent on the benches of the left.

2013 by-election: Wallis and Futuna — 1st round
Party	Candidate	Votes	%	±%
Independent	Napole Polutele	2,543	37.4	+8.6
Independent	Mikaele Kulimoetoke	2,253	33.1	+13.7
Independent	Laurianne Vergé	2,006	29.5	+16.33
Turnout		6,865	75.7	−2.38
2nd round result
Independent	Napole Polutele	2,695	37.5	−4.11
Independent	Mikaele Kulimoetoke	2,318	32.3	−8.74
Independent	Laurianne Vergé	2,171	30.2	+12.4
Turnout		7,243	79.7	−3.11
Independent gain from Independent		Swing	−4.11	

=== 2012 ===
Legislative election 2012: Wallis and Futuna — 1st round
Party	Candidate	Votes	%	±%
Independent	David Vergé	1,997	28.80	
Independent	Mikaele Kulimoetoke	1,345	19.40	
PRG	Albert Likuvalu	1,179	17.00	
PS	Epifano Tui	913	13.17	
MoDem	Antonio Ilalio	858	12.37	
PS	Simione Vanai	642	9.26	
Turnout		7,012	78.08	
2nd round result
Independent	David Vergé	3,068	41.61	n/a
Independent	Mikaele Kulimoetoke	3,026	41.04	n/a
PRG	Albert Likuvalu	1,280	17.36	−34.43
Turnout		7,440	82.81	+18.57
Independent gain from PRG		Swing	−10.18	

=== 2007 ===
Legislative election 2007: Wallis and Futuna — 1st round
Party	Candidate	Votes	%	±%
UMP	Victor Brial	2,625	33.72	
PRG	Albert Likuvalu	2,424	31.14	
Independent	Erménégilde Simète	1,101	14.14	
MoDem	Atonio Ilalio	950	12.50	
NM	Pesamino Taputai	661	8.49	
Turnout		7,849	70.33	
2nd round result
PRG	Albert Likuvalu	4,152	51.79	
UMP	Victor Brial	3,865	48.21	
Turnout		8,089	72.50	
PRG gain from UMP		Swing		

== Sources and notes ==
- French Interior Ministry results website: "Résultats électoraux officiels en France" (in French).
