= Nivaleta Iloai =

Wallisian politician

President of the Territorial Assembly of Wallis and Futuna
- In office 26 November 2020 – 25 March 2022
- Preceded by: Atoloto Kolokilagi
- Succeeded by: Munipoese Muli’aka’aka
- In office 1 April 2013 – 11 December 2013
- Preceded by: Sosefo Suve
- Succeeded by: Petelo Hanisi

Member of the Wallis and Futuna Territorial Assembly for Hihifo

Nivaleta Iloai was a politician from Wallis and Futuna. She served as the first female president of the Territorial Assembly of Wallis and Futuna from April 1 to December 11, 2013, as well as November 26, 2020 to March 25, 2022.

She was a member of the Union socialiste pour Wallis-et-Futuna, and represented the constituency of Hihifo. Nivaleta Iloai was replaced as president by Petelo Hanisi in her first term, after serving only 8 full months. She was again elected president of the Territorial Assembly on November 26, 2020, serving for two more years until 2022. She did not contest the 2022 Wallis and Futuna Territorial Assembly election, being replaced by Munipoese Muli'aka'aka, and has not run for a government position since.

== 2020–2022 tenure ==
For her second term, Nivaleta Iloai advocated for the expansion and improved maintenance of road infrastructure, as well as clean water provision and water purification on the island of Futuna. However, there were major issues regarding the economic outlook of the nation under her term, as well as the cost of living and brain-drain of the population.

During her tenure, Nivaleta Iloai faced the increased pressure of the COVID-19 pandemic, as well as the refocusing of the French political landscape to Pacific security, which resulted in not only increased spending but also funding and attention.

=== Early events ===
In the 2020 vote in the Assembly, Nivaleta Iloai won with 11 votes against 8 for the presidency, replacing Atoloto Kolokilagi. She was elected alongside Frédéric Baudry for vice president with 11 votes against 8, and for the post of first and second secretary, Mikaele Seo and Tuliano Talomafaia were elected, both with 11 votes against 8.

The start of Iloai's term was rather tumultuous. From the beginning, the President had to manage the ongoing COVID-19 pandemic, as well as an epidemic of Dengue Fever, the introduction of new currency to the islands, and strike action from Force Ouvrière (FO) and Syndicat Autonome des Cadres et Employés (SACE) workers.

Early on in her tenure, before she had been ceremonially welcomed, she had to attend a ceremony for the death of Valéry Giscard d'Estaing, first President of the Republic to have visited Wallis and Futuna.

On December 4, Nivaleta Iloai's Union socialiste pour Wallis-et-Futuna party oversaw the expansion of the national budget to 3.865 billion Pacific francs, an increase of 282 million. For 2021, the operating budget was also enlarged to 3.527 billion francs, with 338 million additionally allocated for local investment.

On December 7, Nivaleta Iloai arrived in Futuna to officially present her new office to the authorities. The delegation was made up of Senator Mikaele Kulimoetoke, Vice President Baudry Frédéric, Secretaries Mikaele Seo and Tuliano Talomafaia, and President of the Standing Committee Mireille Laufilitoga. The formal visit took place the following day, with the first visit to the kingdom of Sigavé. Here the President met King Keleta'ona and his chieftaincies, Safeitoga and Manafa, in Fiua, with the members then witnessing a kava ceremony performed for the occasion. The ceremonial visit continued in the kingdom of Alo. In Fale, Nivaleta Iloai met King Tui'agaifo and his chiefdom, exchanging pleasantries and welcoming the development of the kingdom and wider islands.

=== 2021 ===
==== Covid-19 ====
In April, the President attended the online meeting discussing the "Management of the health crisis linked to Covid-19 in New Caledonia, French Polynesia and Wallis and Futuna", hosted by multiple French Overseas Territories including Wallis and Futuna. Chaired by Tematai Le Gayic, President of AEPFP (Association of Students of French Polynesia in Paris) Nivaleta Iloai was joined by Thierry Santa, President of the Government of New Caledonia and Christelle Lehartel, Minister of Education and representing the President of French Polynesia, Edouard Fritch.

During the meeting, Nivaleta Iloai and Thierry Santa jointly explained the need for their territories to be "Covid Free" and to be vaccinated en masse. They expressed the concern to improve communication towards the public, trying to better explain social media misinformation as well as the surprise suspension of the AstraZeneca vaccine. President Nivaleta Iloai also emphasized that no one is obliged to be vaccinated, but would try to remove vaccine hesitancy by having officials vaccinated. There was also the announcement that 18,000 Pfizer vaccines had been sent to Wallis and Futuna.

For violence against women, the President downplayed it stating that no case of violence against women for coordinating the health crisis had been reported in the islands. This contradicted Thierry Santa, who said that in New Caledonia, violence was “really a scourge” with “a 25% increase in violence" and Christelle Lehartel recognising a "slight rise" in domestic violence, with the sale of alcohol being prohibited.

In terms of economic recovery from COVID-19, the President explained the loan granted by the French State makes it possible to lend to companies with at least two years of activity and the presentation of two financial statements, and partial aid for closed companies.

==== Other events ====
On May 3, Nivaleta Iloai was an invited member to the 7th Meeting of Pacific Ministers for Women hosted by the Pacific Community. Over three days the meeting discussed the empowerment of women and ensuring that all women have access to and control over their resources, health, livelihoods, and lives.

In July, President Nivaleta participated in a video conference with the President of the South Province, Sonia Backes. The meeting ended with the signing of a letter of intent between the Territory and the South Province for increased cooperation between the islands, with an importance on the exchange of youth institutions. It is mainly aimed at initiating the youth of each of the territories to the democratic system and the construction of free thought.

==== French presidential visit ====
In preparation and during President Macron's visit to France's Pacific territories, Nivaleta Iloai engaged in many international and regional events and meetings.

She was among fifteen other leaders, including eight heads of state and government such as Australian Scott Morrison and those of the Cook Islands, New Zealand, Marshall Islands and Papua New Guinea, to attend the fifth France-Oceania summit. During this event, a new coast guard partnership was announced, aimed at strengthening against illegal shipping in the region and improving maritime safety. Climate was also an important topic, with France sending more funds to increase its funding for programs to protect ecosystems, such as the Kiwa initiative and coral reef protection. There was also talk to make financial efforts to improve "connectivity" in the Pacific region with the aim of strengthening the "integration" of its overseas territories.

During President Macron's visit to the Wallis and Futuna Islands, he gave respect to the ancestral history of the Indigenous people, as well as gave his "respectful" and "affectionate greetings" to the President of the Territorial Assembly, Nivaleta Iloai, to the Lavelua of Uvea, to the Tuiaga'ifo King of Alo, and to the Keleta'ona de Sigave.

=== 2022 election ===
In the 2022 Wallis and Futuna Territorial Assembly election, Nivaleta Iloai did not contest the presidency, not running for any representative listing. This resulted in the unanimous election of Munipoese Muli'aka'aka to the presidency.
