= Hervé Loste =

Wallisian politician

Member of the French National Assembly for Wallis and Futuna's constituency
- In office 25 March 1962 – 2 April 1967
- Preceded by: None (constituency established)
- Succeeded by: Benjamin Brial

Personal details
- Born: 29 May 1926 Villenave-d'Ornon, France
- Died: February 10, 1994 (aged 67) Nouméa, New Caledonia
- Party: National Centre of Independents and Peasants

Hervé Loste (29 May 1926 – 10 February 1994) was a French politician who represented Wallis and Futuna in the French National Assembly from 1962 to 1967.

Loste was born in Villenave-d'Ornon and was the son of Henry Loste and a grandson of André Ballande. He became director of the Ballande Establishments in Nouméa and Wallis and Futuna . He became involved in politics and became the first deputy of the new overseas territory of Wallis and Futuna during the 1962 French legislative election, under the label of the National Centre of Independents and Peasants, defeating Emmanuel-Victor Brial, son of Julien Brial. He supported his father Henry Loste who became senator for the territory a few months later. In November 1962, a new election took place and he was re-elected deputy under the label of the Independent Republicans. Loste was beaten by Benjamin Brial at the end of his mandate, in 1967.
