= Sosefo Suve =

Wallisian politician

President of the Territorial Assembly of Wallis and Futuna
- In office 28 November 2012 – 1 April 2013
- Preceded by: Vetelino Nau
- Succeeded by: Nivaleta Iloai

Member of the Wallis and Futuna Territorial Assembly for Hihifo
- In office 25 March 2012 – 26 March 2017
- Succeeded by: Soane Mailagi

Personal details
- Party: Independent

Sosefo Suve is a Wallisian politician and member of the Territorial Assembly of Wallis and Futuna. He was President of the Territorial Assembly from 2012 to 2013.

Suve was a schoolteacher. He was first elected to the Territorial Assembly at the 2012 Wallis and Futuna Territorial Assembly election. He was a candidate for Assembly President following the election, but was defeated by Vetelino Nau by 11 votes to 9.

In November 2012 he was elected as President of the Assembly, serving for four months until being replaced by Nivaleta Iloai. In December 2014 he was elected president of the Assembly's standing committee. He lost his seat at the 2017 election.

In November 2015 he was appointed to the French Economic, Social and Environmental Council (CESE) by the Overseas Minister. His term on the CESE ended in March 2021.
