= Lauriane Vergé =

Wallisian politician

Member of the Wallis and Futuna Territorial Assembly for Hahake
- Incumbent
- Assumed office 20 March 2022

Lauriane Dominika Tialetagi Vergé is a Wallisian politician and member of the Territorial Assembly of Wallis and Futuna. She was the first woman in Wallis and Futuna to run for the French National Assembly. She is the wife of former MP David Vergé.

In 2013 she ran in a by-election for the French National Assembly when her husband's election was annulled by the Constitutional Council, the first time a woman had stood. She won 29% of the vote in the first round, but came third in the second round, losing to Napole Polutele.

In May 2016 she was elected president of the Wallis and Futuna Chamber of Commerce, Industry and Craft Trades. As chamber of commerce president she promoted the establishment of a tourism industry.

She was first elected to the Territorial Assembly of Wallis and Futuna in the 2022 Wallis and Futuna Territorial Assembly election.

She again ran for the National Assembly in the 2022 French legislative election, but came seventh, and did not progress to the second round.
