= Kamilo Gata =

French politician

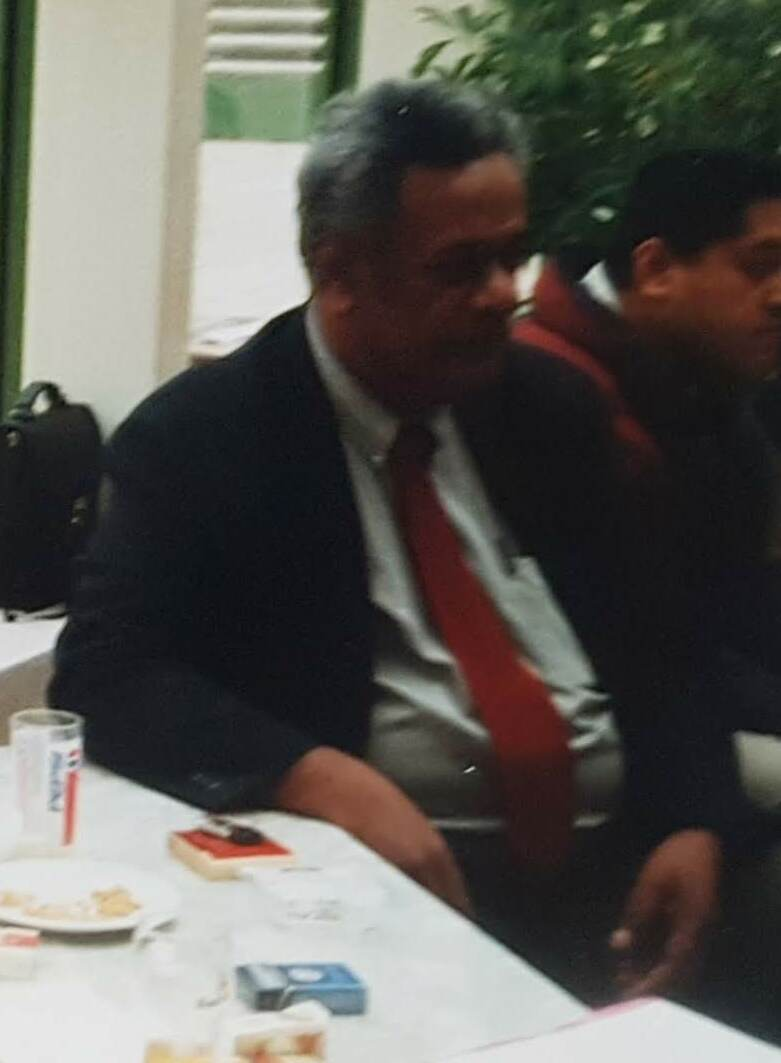
- Gata in Paris in 1996

Member of the French National Assembly for Wallis and Futuna's constituency
- In office 15 January 1989 – 21 April 1997
- Preceded by: Benjamin Brial
- Succeeded by: Victor Brial

Personal details
- Born: 12 December 1949 Futuna, Wallis and Futuna
- Died: 16 November 2004 (aged 54) Crows Nest, Queensland
- Party: Rally for the Republic; People's Union for Wallis and Futuna
- Spouse: Kalala Gata-Kilifekai

Kamilo Gata (12 December 1949 - 16 November 2004) was a Wallisian politician who represented Wallis and Futuna in the French National Assembly from 1989 to 1997. A lawyer, he left the local Rally for the Republic to found his own party, the People's Union for Wallis and Futuna, and won the 1989 legislative election against Benjamin Brial. Throughout his political career, his party the UPWF never obtained a majority in territorial elections. Re-elected in 1993, he served a second term. He was defeated in the 1997 French legislative election as well as in the senatorial election of 1998. He became social and economic adviser of Wallis-and-Futuna in 1999. He was the husband of politician Kalala Gata-Kilifekai.

== Early life ==
Gata was born in Futuna on 12 December 1949. He obtained a master's degree in private law in 1974 and became a lawyer. He joined the Office of General Administration and Elections in 1977. In 1982, he left for Clermont-Ferrand to train at the tax school and obtained the rank of tax inspector.

== Political career ==
Gata became technical adviser to the Rally for the Republic (RPR) in Wallis and Futuna. Nevertheless, "disappointed by the immobility of his original party" and in opposition to the deputy Benjamin Brial, who had been in office since 1967, he stood for the National Assembly at the 1988 French legislative election. The election was won by Brial because of the dispersion of the voices of the opposition. However, the election result was subsequently overturned by the Constitutional Council.

Gata won the subsequent by-election as a candidate for the Movement of Left Radicals, after receiving the support of Michel Hoatau and Gaston Lutui as well as the two kings of Futuna. Gata won the votes of the young generations, eager for change. Because of his ties to the left, the Wallisian and Futunian community in New Caledonia also supported him. For David Chappell, Kamilo Gata succeeded in bridging the gap between more populated and developed Wallis and more isolated Futuna. He stood for re-election in the 1993 election and was re-elected against Clovis Logologofolau of the RPR with 52.4% of the vote. He later contested the 1994 European Parliament election as a candidate for the Socialist Party, but his list ranking was too low to be elected.

He ran again for the National Assembly in the 1997 election, losing to Victor Brial in the second round. In September 1998 he stood as a candidate for the French Senate, but was defeated by Robert Laufoaulu. He was in 77th position on the Socialist Party list led by François Hollande during the 1999 European Parliament elections.

In 1999, he was appointed social and economic adviser for Wallis and Futuna.

In 2004, he died of a long illness at the age of 55, shortly after the death of Benjamin Brial the same year.
