= Voice of the Wallis and Futuna Peoples =

The Voice of the Wallis and Futuna Peoples (French: La Voix des Peuples Wallisens et Futuniens) is a political party in the French collectivité d'outre-mer of Wallis and Futuna. It was established during the political realignment around the 2002 Wallis and Futuna Territorial Assembly election, when some members of the Rally for the Republic and the People's Union for Wallis and Futuna formed a coalition following the election of Patalione Kanimoa as President of the Assembly. In response, former President Soane Uhila and five other Assembly members formed the VPWF.
