= Lavinia Tagane =

Wallisian politician

Member of the Wallis and Futuna Territorial Assembly for Hahake
- Incumbent
- Assumed office 26 March 2017

Lavinia Tagane-Kanimoa (born ~1990 or 1991) is a Wallisian politician and member of the Territorial Assembly of Wallis and Futuna.

Tagane-Kanimoa was born in Wallis and is the daughter of a former member of the Territorial Assembly. After completing high school she studied in France, completing a diploma in marketing at Châtellerault and then a touris degree and a masters in commerce in Bordeaux. After working in France in the e-commerce sector, she returned to Wallis.

She was first elected to the Territorial Assembly in the 2017 Wallis and Futuna Territorial Assembly election, where she ran on a youth platform. In 2017 she also served as alternate to French National Assembly member Napole Polutele. She was re-elected to the Territorial Assembly at the 2022 election.

In 2018 she was appointed to the jury of the International Oceanian Documentary Film Festival.
