= Sylvain Brial =

French politician (born 1964)

Member of the Wallis and Futuna Territorial Assembly for Sigave
- In office 26 March 2017 – 28 October 2020

Member of the French National Assembly for Wallis and Futuna's constituency
- In office 16 April 2018 – 18 June 2022
- Preceded by: Napole Polutele
- Succeeded by: Mikaele Seo

Personal details
- Born: 16 September 1964 (age 61) Sigave, Wallis and Futuna
- Party: Les Republicains; Liberties and Territories

Sylvain Jacques Brial (born 16 September 1964) is a Wallisian politician and former member of the French National Assembly.

Brial is from a prominent political family. His grandmother was Aloisia Brial, Lavelua (queen) of Uvéa from 1954 to 1958, and his father is politician Cyprien Brial, who served in the Territorial Assembly of Wallis and Futuna from 1967 to 1987. His brothers are former territorial councilor Julien Brial and former MP Victor Brial. His uncle Benjamin Brial was also a member of the National Assembly, while his cousin Gil Brial is involved in the politics of New Caledonia. He works as a building contractor.

Brial first entered politics when he ran in the 2017 Wallis and Futuna Territorial Assembly election, and was elected as a representative for Sigave. He subsequently contested the 2017 French legislative election, but was defeated in the first round by incumbent Napole Polutele. He filed an appeal with the Counstitutional Council, which annulled the election.

During the resulting by-election Brial stood as a candidate for Les Republicains, and promised the acquisition of an ATR 42 aircraft to serve Wallis and Futuna. He won the by-election in the first round, with 51.6% of the vote. In the National Assembly he sat with the Liberties and Territories group.

In September 2019 he suffered a serious stroke during a trip by his parliamentary group to La Rochelle which led to him being placed in an artificial coma. After several months of hospitalisation he began rehabilitation in Paris and then New Caledonia. In October 2020 he resigned from the Territorial Assembly due to non-attendance. He did not contest the 2022 French legislative election.
