= Sophie Panonacle =

French politician (born 1968)

- Panonacle in 2020

Member of the National Assembly for Gironde's 8th constituency
- Incumbent
- Assumed office 21 June 2017
- Preceded by: Yves Foulon

Personal details
- Born: 16 December 1968 (age 57) Bordeaux, France
- Party: Renaissance
- Education: University of Bordeaux; Kedge Business School

Sophie Panonacle (French pronunciation: [sɔfi panɔnakl]; born 16 December 1968) is a French politician who has represented the 8th constituency of the Gironde department in the National Assembly as a member of Renaissance (RE, formerly La République En Marche!) since 2017.

== Biography ==
Sophie Panonacle is the daughter of Guy Dupiol, himself the son of a Spanish immigrant and a communist activist. Guy Dupiol, a retired Air Force officer, was mayor of Saint-Symphorien, Gironde from 1995 to 2020. After two years (1988-1989) at the Montesquieu University, she spent 1990 to 1993 working part-time to pay for her studies, completing a BTS in executive secretarial studies and the equivalent of today's professional bachelor's degree in commercial management at the Bordeaux Business School.

After completing her studies, she joined the Seppa communications agency in 1997, which specializes in the public sector and is managed by Christian Panonacle. Panonacle, born on April 12, 1952, was a former parliamentary assistant to Michel Sainte-Marie, the Socialist Party deputy mayor of Mérignac, Gironde, who was also his high school physics and chemistry teacher. He founded the agency in 1981 and sold it to Xavier Pineau.

Sophie Dupiol married her boss in 1999. In 2000, she joined the agency's events department and worked on launching Bordeaux's first “Salon de l'Environnement” (Environment Fair). In 2001, following the birth of their son Hugo, the couple moved to Arcachon. Together with her husband, she initially ran a hotel and restaurant (“L'Escale du Bassin” in Arcachon). Their son Hugo was admitted to Sciences Po.

Her husband, Christian Panonacle, ran in the 2020 municipal elections in Arcachon under the LREM banner. Coming in fourth in the first round, he won a seat on the municipal council in the opposition.
