= François Deluga =

French politician

Member of the National Assembly of France
- In office 1997–2002
- Preceded by: Robert Cazalet
- Succeeded by: Marie-Hélène des Esgaulx
- Constituency: Gironde 8th
- In office 1 December 2008 – 2012
- Preceded by: Marie-Hélène des Esgaulx
- Succeeded by: Yves Foulon

Mayor of Le Teich
- Incumbent
- Assumed office 19 March 1989
- Preceded by: Claude Laymand

8th Vice President, Aquitaine Regional Council

Personal details
- Born: 18 November 1956 (age 69) Bordeaux, France
- Party: PS
- Occupation: Insurance agent

François Deluga (born 18 November 1956 in Cauderan, Bordeaux, Gironde) is a member of the National Assembly of France, representing the 8th constituency of Gironde.

An insurance agent by profession, Deluga was elected for the first time in 1989, when he was elected as Mayor of Le Teich, to which he was re-elected in 1995, 2001 and 2008.

In the 1997 election, he won the Gironde 8th for the first time, beating Robert Cazalet of the UDF. For the course of that Parliament, he was a member of the Commission on National Defence and the Armed Forces. He only served a single term, before being defeated in the 2002 election by Marie-Hélène des Esgaulx of the UMP. In a re-match in 2007, des Esgaulx triumphed for a second time.

In the regional election of 2004, Deluga was elected to the Aquitaine Regional Council, where he was then chosen to be the 8th Vice President, with responsibility for tourism.

In 2008, des Esgaulx resigned following her election to the French Senate, and a by-election was held for her constituency. Standing again, Deluga won the election, beating Yves Foulon of the UMP, and promised to stand down from his position on the Regional Council.
