= Mikaele Seo =

French politician

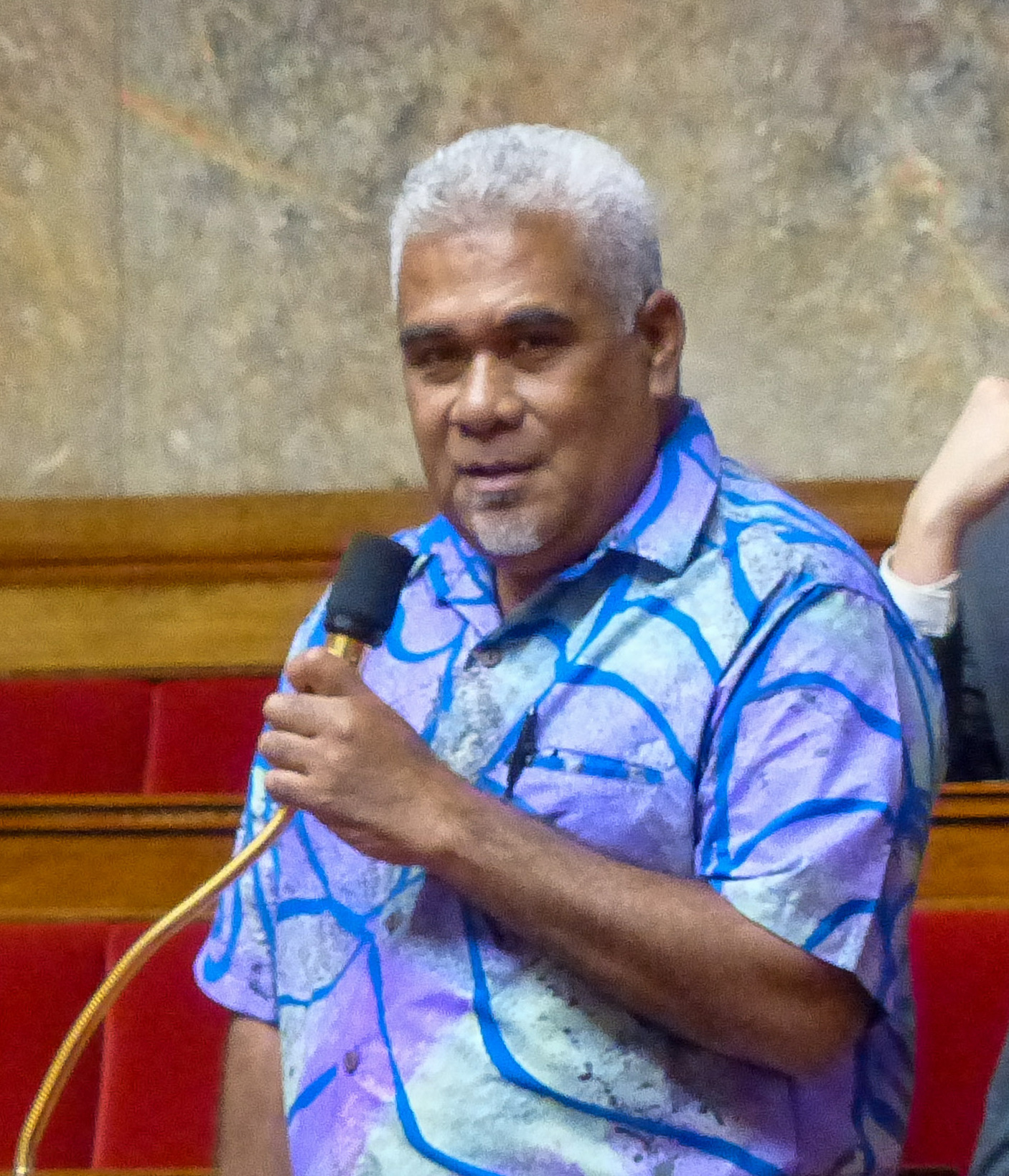
- Seo in 2025

Member of the Wallis and Futuna Territorial Assembly for Mua District
- Incumbent
- Assumed office 26 March 2017

Member of the French National Assembly for Wallis and Futuna's constituency
- Incumbent
- Assumed office 18 June 2022
- Preceded by: Sylvain Brial

Personal details
- Born: 27 December 1971 (age 54) Uvea, Wallis and Futuna
- Party: Renaissance

Mikaele Seo (born 27 December 1971) is a Wallisian politician and member of the Territorial Assembly of Wallis and Futuna. Since 2022 he has represented Wallis and Futuna in the French National Assembly.

Before entering politics Seo worked as a cleaner in a college in Wallis.

Seo was elected to the Territorial Assembly in the 2017 Wallis and Futuna Territorial Assembly election, representing the Mua District. He was appointed chair of the Assembly's standing committee. He was re-elected in the 2022 elections.

Seo served as the alternate for Sylvain Brial and took over his seat in the National Assembly after his stroke. He stood for Brial's seat in the National Assembly in the 2022 French legislative election, and was elected in the second round with 50.11% of the vote. He intends to sit with the president's party, Renaissance, in the Assembly.
