= Petelo Hanisi =

Wallisian politician

President of the Territorial Assembly of Wallis and Futuna
- In office 11 December 2013 – 26 November 2014
- Preceded by: Nivaleta Iloai
- Succeeded by: Mikaele Kulimoetoke

Member of the Wallis and Futuna Territorial Assembly for Haheke
- In office 25 March 2012 – 26 March 2017

Petelo Hanisi is a Wallisian politician and former member of the Territorial Assembly of Wallis and Futuna. He was president of the Territorial Assembly of Wallis and Futuna from 2013 to 2014.

He lost his seat at the 2017 Wallis and Futuna Territorial Assembly election.
