= David Vergé =

Wallisian politician

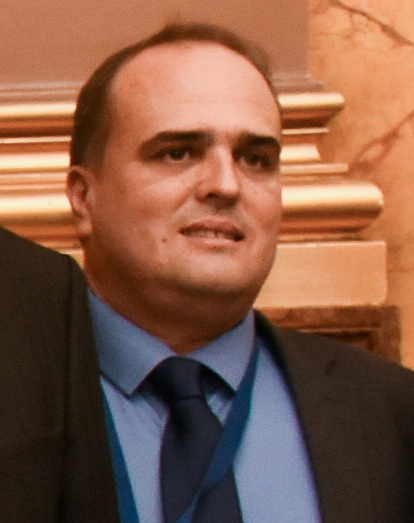
- David Vergé in 2018

President of the Territorial Assembly of Wallis and Futuna
- In office 4 April 2017 – 29 November 2019
- Preceded by: Mikaele Kulimoetoke
- Succeeded by: Atoloto Kolokilagi

Member of the French National Assembly for Wallis and Futuna's constituency
- In office 20 June 2012 – 25 January 2013
- Preceded by: Albert Likuvalu
- Succeeded by: Napole Polutele

Member of the Wallis and Futuna Territorial Assembly for Haheke
- In office 4 April 2012 – 20 March 2022

Personal details
- Born: 10 January 1972 (age 54) La Fère, France

David Vergé (born 10 January 1972) is a Wallisian politician. He represented Wallis and Futuna in the French National Assembly from 2012 to 2013 and was president of the Territorial Assembly of Wallis and Futuna from 2017 to 2019.

Vergé was born in La Fère in France and is a businessman. He was first elected to the Territorial Assembly of Wallis and Futuna in the constituency of Hahake in the 2012 Wallis and Futuna Territorial Assembly election.

He was elected to the French National Assembly in the second round of the 2012 French legislative election in the constituency of Wallis and Futuna with 41.6% of the votes cast, with the support of the Rassemblement pour Wallis-et-Futuna (RPWF), the local federation of the Union for a Popular Movement (UMP) led by former MP Victor Brial. In the National Assembly, he sat first as an independent, then as an affiliate of the socialist group (despite the support that the UMP had given him when he was elected in June 2012). He was a member of the Sustainable Development and Regional Planning Commission. On 25 January 2013 his election was annulled by the Constitutional Council, which declared him ineligible for a period of one year. The candidate supported by the UMP, Napole Polutele, succeeded him two months later, following a by- election in which his wife, Lauriane Vergé, participated.

He was re-elected to the Territorial Assembly in the 2017 elections, and was elected President of the Assembly on 4 April 2017. He was re-elected as assembly president on 27 November 2017. In the first round of the 2017 French presidential election he supported François Fillon, who obtained 28.5% of the vote in Wallis and Futuna, against 20% nationally.

He was re-elected assembly president in November 2018. he did not stand for re-election in 2019, surrendering the position to Atoloto Kolokilagi.

He stood for the Senate of France in the 2020 French Senate election, coming fourth in the first round with 18% of the vote. He withdrew his candidacy in the second round.
