= 2022 Wallis and Futuna Territorial Assembly election =

- 20 March 2022
- All 20 seats in the Territorial Assembly; 11 seats needed for a majority
Party	Seats	+/–
DVG	10	0
DVC	2	+1
PS	1	+1
DVD	1	−1
LR	1	−2
Independents	5	+5
This lists parties that won seats. See the complete results below.
Results by constituency

Elections for the Territorial Assembly of Wallis and Futuna were held on 20 March 2022 where all 20 seats were up for election.

== Background ==
The 2017 Wallis and Futuna Territorial Assembly election saw 19 electoral lists sharing the 20 seats of the Territorial Assembly. The only list able to gain two seats was Fakatahi kihe kaha'u e lelei / Ensemble pour un avenir meilleur (Together for a Better Future). There were nine newly elected members in the 20-seat Assembly. Among the elected members, six were women.

The 2017 elections were noted for their very high participation, one of the highest in the recent history of Wallis and Futuna. Slightly more than 88% of the electorate voted, with voter turnout at 87% on Wallis and 93% on Futuna.

== Results ==
Half the seats were won by new members. Turnout was over 84 percent.

Hihifo
Party	Votes	%	Seats	Elected
Fakatahi kihe kahau lelei	376	31.44	1	Soane Paulo Mailagi
Fakatahi'aga o Hihifo	317	26.51	1	Lémee Ronny Tauhavili
Amanaki, ke tahi	233	19.48	1	Sandrine Ilalio
Vaka'afea	214	17.89	0	
Sii hahai siakina ite mauli aho fuli	56	4.68	0	
Total	1,196	100.00	3	
Valid votes	1,196	99.09		
Invalid/blank votes	11	0.91		
Total votes	1,207	100.00		
Registered voters/turnout	1,484	81.33		
Source: Government of Wallis and Futuna

Hahake
Party	Votes	%	Seats	Elected
Ta'ofi ki Uvea mo Futuna	535	24.84	1	Mikaele Kulimoetoke
Ta'ofi ke ma'u pea sio mama'o	522	24.23	1	Atelea Vaitootai
Le'o o he kaha'u lelei	435	20.19	1	Lavinia Kanimoa
Ofa kite kaha'u	354	16.43	1	Lauriane Vergé
Amanaki kihe apogipogi lelei	308	14.30	0	
Total	2,154	100.00	4	
Valid votes	2,154	98.58		
Invalid/blank votes	31	1.42		
Total votes	2,185	100.00		
Registered voters/turnout	2,720	80.33		
Source: Government of Wallis and Futuna

Mua
Party	Votes	%	Seats	Elected
Ofa mo'oni ki tou fenua	422	19.74	2	Munipoese Muli’aka’aka, Palatina Fiakaifonu
Mauli fetokoniaki	413	19.32	2	Mikaele Seo, Malia Kialiki Lagikula
Le'o akiha	286	13.38	1	Paino Vanai
Ofa peake gaue ki he kaha'u lelei	277	12.96	1	Sosefo Toluafe
Ta'ofi kite lelei fakatahi	193	9.03	0	
Mauli Fakatahi	161	7.53	0	
Si'i Mua ma'a tatou - Uvea mo Futuna	140	6.55	0	
Faigamalie kite kaha'u	133	6.22	0	
Laga fenua	113	5.29	0	
Total	2,138	100.00	6	
Valid votes	2,138	99.35		
Invalid/blank votes	14	0.65		
Total votes	2,152	100.00		
Registered voters/turnout	2,522	85.33		
Source: Government of Wallis and Futuna

Alo
Party	Votes	%	Seats	Elected
Fau ile alofa	402	26.19	1	Lafaele Tukumuli
Vaka fo'ou tou fakatasi	366	23.84	1	Petelo Leleivai
Lou Fenua	311	20.26	1	Sosefo Motuku
Travail et Partage	257	16.74	1	Frédéric Baudry
Alo-fa	199	12.96	0	
Total	1,535	100.00	4	
Valid votes	1,535	99.80		
Invalid/blank votes	3	0.20		
Total votes	1,538	100.00		
Registered voters/turnout	1,702	90.36		
Source: Government of Wallis and Futuna

Sigave (annulled results)
Party	Votes	%	Seats	Elected
Tou fakatasi kile apogipogi olotatou fenua	238	27.29	1	Soane Taukolo
Fakatasi kile tou ka'au	217	24.89	1	Tuliano Talomafaia
Amanaki	209	23.97	1	Charles Gaveau
Kile laga o lou fenua	208	23.85	0	
Total	872	100.00	3	
Valid votes	872	99.89		
Invalid/blank votes	1	0.11		
Total votes	873	100.00		
Registered voters/turnout	1,072	81.44		
Source: Government of Wallis and Futuna

== Partial cancellation ==
On 15 November 2022 the Council of State cancelled the result of the elections in Sigave, due to irregularities noted during the vote. There are new elections on 5 February 2023.

Candidate	Party	Votes	%
Charles Gaveau	Amanaki	351	36.87
Samuele Keletolona	Kile laga o lou fenua	315	33.09
Soane Taukolo	Tou fakatasi kile apogipogi olotatou fenua	286	30.04
Total		952	100.00
Valid votes		952	99.90
Invalid/blank votes		1	0.10
Total votes		953	100.00
Registered voters/turnout		1,053	90.50
Source: France Info
