= Ségolène Amiot =

French politician (born 1986)

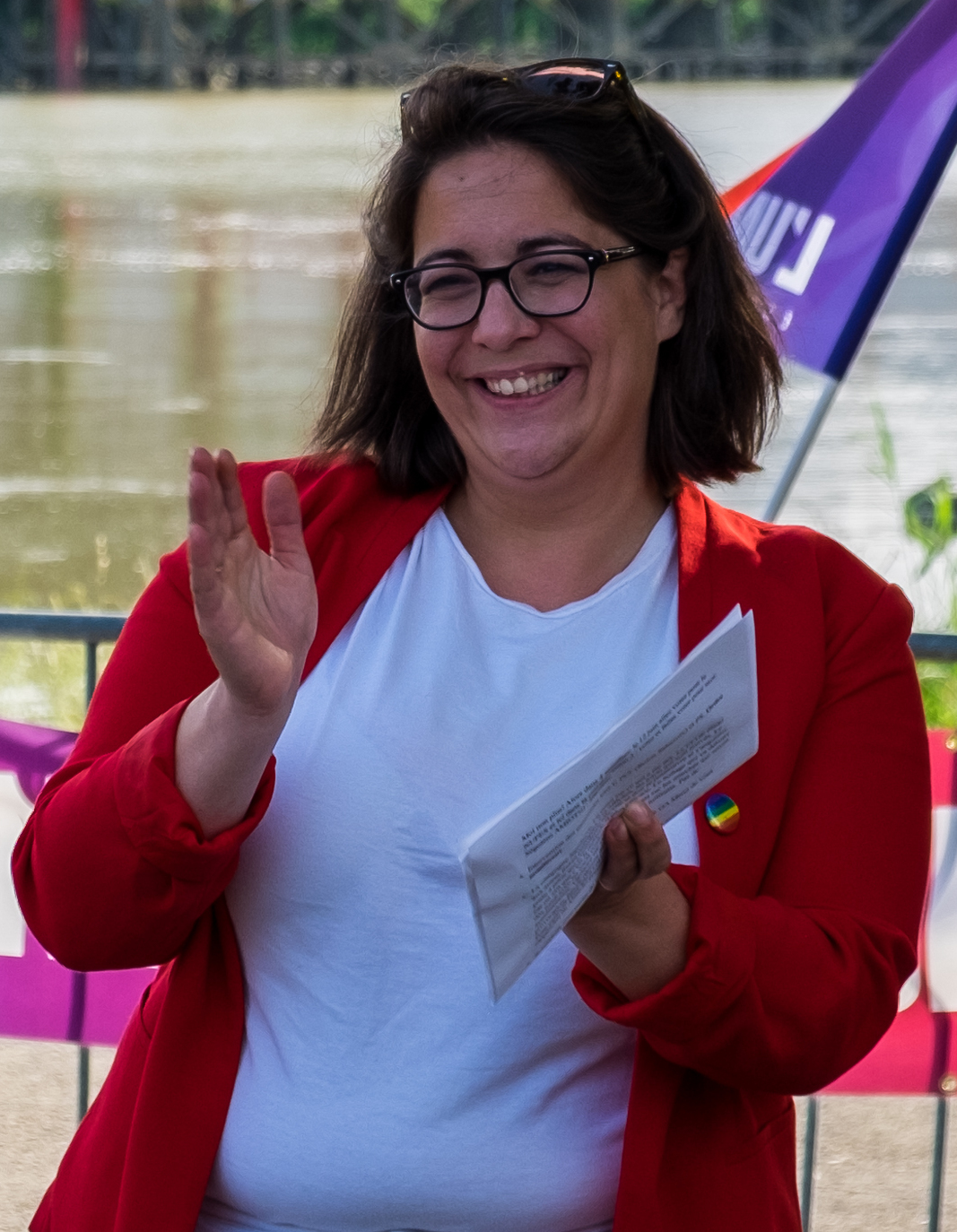
- Amiot in 2022.

Member of the National Assembly for Loire-Atlantique's 3rd constituency
- Incumbent
- Assumed office 22 June 2022
- Preceded by: Anne-France Brunet

Personal details
- Born: 23 February 1986 (age 40) Châtenay-Malabry, Hauts-de-Seine, France
- Party: La France Insoumise
- Occupation: politician

Ségolène Amiot (French pronunciation: [seɡɔlɛn amjo]; born 23 February 1986) is a French politician from La France Insoumise. She was elected as a deputy for Loire-Atlantique's 3rd constituency in the 2022 French legislative election.

== See also ==
- List of deputies of the 16th National Assembly of France
