= Emeni Simete =

Wallisian politician

President of the Territorial Assembly of Wallis and Futuna
- Incumbent
- Assumed office 23 November 2005

Member of the Wallis and Futuna Territorial Assembly for Mua District
- In office 10 March 2002 – 25 March 2012
- Preceded by: 11 April 2007
- Succeeded by: Apeleto Likuvalu

Assembly Member for Pesamino Taputai

Personal details
- Born: Utufua, Wallis and Futuna
- Party: Union for a Popular Movement

Ermenegilde Simete is a Wallisian politician and former member of the Territorial Assembly of Wallis and Futuna. He served as President of the Territorial Assembly from November 2005 to April 2007.

Simete is from Utufua. He was elected President of the Territorial Assembly in November 2005. He was replaced as president by Pesamino Taputai following the 2007 Wallis and Futuna Territorial Assembly election, but was elected president of the Assembly's permanent commission. He stood for the French National Assembly in the 2007 French legislative election, but was eliminated in the first round.

After leaving politics he worked as a deputy prosecutor in Nouméa, before becoming head of Wallis and Futuna's Director of Catholic Education.
