= Anne-France Brunet =

French politician (born 1962)

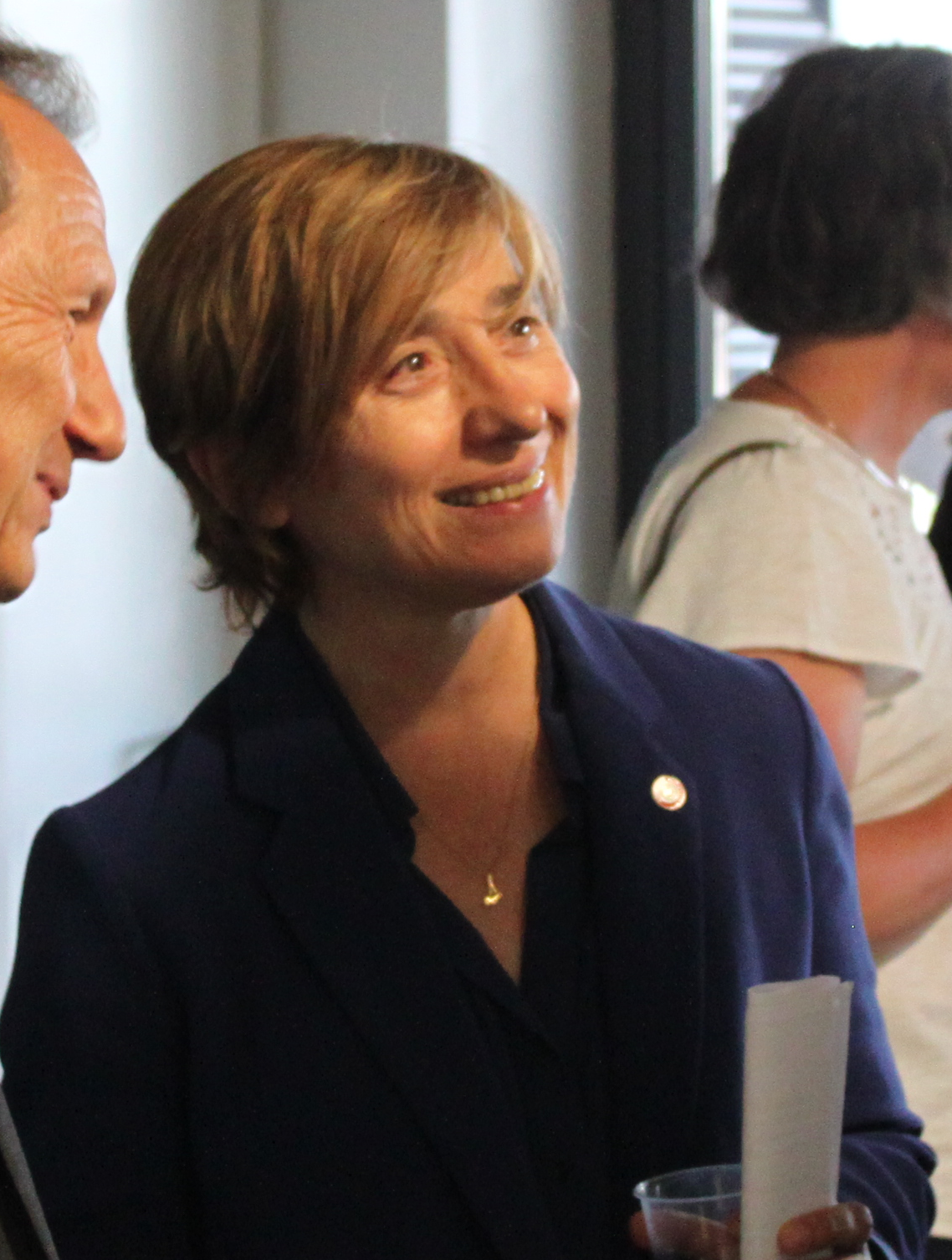

Member of the National Assembly for Loire-Atlantique's 3rd constituency
- In office 21 June 2017 – 21 June 2022
- Preceded by: Karine Daniel
- Succeeded by: Ségolène Amiot

Personal details
- Born: 12 June 1962 (age 63) Saint-Maur-des-Fossés, France
- Party: Renaissance
- Education: Toulouse III - Paul Sabatier University; Conservatoire national des arts et métiers Stanford University

Anne-France Brunet (French pronunciation: [an fʁɑ̃s bʁynɛ]; born 12 June 1962) is a French politician of Renaissance served as a member of the French National Assembly from 2017 to 2022, representing the department of Loire-Atlantique.

== Political career ==
Brune joined LREM in 2016.

In parliament, Brunet served on the Defence Committee from 2017 until 2018 before moving to the Committee on Economic Affairs. In addition to her committee assignments, she is also a member of the French-German Parliamentary Friendship Group.

In September 2018, after François de Rugy's appointment to the government, Brunet supported Barbara Pompili's candidacy for the presidency of the National Assembly.

== Political positions ==
In July 2019, Brunet voted in favor of the French ratification of the European Union’s Comprehensive Economic and Trade Agreement (CETA) with Canada.

== Controversy ==
In 2022, a former parliamentary assistant filed a complaint against Bunet, alleging "incessant" phone calls on her personal phone, unpaid work days and "humiliations in public" during the time of employment in 2018.
