= Gironde's 8th constituency =

Constituency of the National Assembly of France

8th constituency of Gironde
- inline Constituency of the National Assembly of France

- Location of constituency in Department

- Location of Gironde in France
- Deputy: Sophie Panonacle; RE
- Department: Gironde
- Cantons: (pre-2015) Arcachon, Audenge, Bazas, Belin-Béliet, Captieux, Grignols, Saint-Symphorien, La Teste-de-Buch, Villandraut.

The 8th constituency of the Gironde (French: Huitième circonscription de la Gironde) is a French legislative constituency in Gironde département. Like the other 576 French constituencies, it elects one MP using the two-round system, with a run-off if no candidate receives over 50% of the vote in the first round.

== Historical representation ==
Election	Member	Party
1988	Robert Cazalet	UDF
1993	Robert Cazalet	UDF
1997	François Deluga	PS
2002	Marie-Hélène des Esgaulx	UMP
2007	Marie-Hélène des Esgaulx	UMP
2008	François Deluga	PS
2012	Yves Foulon	UMP
2017	Sophie Panonacle	LREM
2022	Sophie Panonacle	RE
2024	Sophie Panonacle	RE

== Election results ==
=== 2024 ===
Candidate	Party	Alliance	First round			Second round		
Candidate	Party	Alliance	Votes	%	+/–	Votes	%	+/–
Laurent Lamara	RN		31,248	36.86	+17.13	36,137	43.59	+3.59
Sophie Panonacle	REN	Ensemble	26,881	31.71	-3.31	46,756	56.41	-3.59
Marylène Faure	PCF	NFP	15,849	18.70	-0.14	withdrew		
Marc Morin	LR	UDC	8,673	10.23	+0.26			
Marie-Christine Caries	REC		1,090	1.20	-4.52			
Rémy Coste	LO		898	1.06	+0.41			
Céline Blut	DIV		137	0.16	new			
Votes			84,776	100.00		82,893	100.00	
Valid votes			84,776	97.55	-0.70	82,893	95.28	+3.97
Blank votes			1,463	1.68	+0.40	3,023	3.47	-2.98
Null votes			663	0.76	+0.29	1,085	1.25	-0.99
Turnout			86,902	71.49	+20.68	87,001	71.56	+23.66
Abstentions			34,656	28.51	-20.68	34,580	28.44	-23.66
Registered voters			121,558			121,581		
Result			RE HOLD					

=== 2022 ===
Legislative Election 2022: Gironde's 8th constituency
Party	Candidate	Votes	%	±%
LREM (Ensemble)	Sophie Panonacle	20,943	35.02	-5.36
RN	Laurent Lamara	11,798	19.73	+9.17
PCF (NUPÉS)	Marylène Faure	11,269	18.84	−1.00
LR (UDC)	Marc Morin	5,964	9.97	−14.02
REC	Alexane Isnard	3,420	5.72	N/A
DVG	Alain Chauteau	2,211	3.70	N/A
Others	N/A	4,203		
Turnout		59,808	50.81	−0.71
2nd round result
LREM (Ensemble)	Sophie Panonacle	31,442	60.00	+0.25
RN	Laurent Lamara	20,965	40.00	−0.25
Turnout		52,407	47.90	+2.75
LREM hold				

=== 2017 ===
Candidate	Label	First round		Second round	
Candidate	Label	Votes	%	Votes	%
Sophie Panonacle	REM	22,337	40.38	26,713	59.75
Yves Foulon	LR	13,271	23.99	17,997	40.25
Laurent Lamara	FN	5,841	10.56		
Cécile Coti	FI	5,692	10.29		
Pierre Pradayrol	PS	2,879	5.20		
Nicolas Dubot	ECO	1,983	3.58		
Anny Bey	DVD	1,316	2.38		
Sophie Le Page	DLF	1,047	1.89		
Danielle Trannoy	PCF	428	0.77		
Fabienne Coulais	DIV	304	0.55		
Solange Texier	EXG	219	0.40		
Votes		55,317	100.00	44,710	100.00
Valid votes		55,317	98.46	44,710	90.80
Blank votes		617	1.10	3,145	6.39
Null votes		251	0.45	1,385	2.81
Turnout		56,185	51.52	49,240	45.15
Abstentions		52,880	48.48	59,820	54.85
Registered voters		109,065		109,060	
Source: Ministry of the Interior

=== 2012 ===
2012 legislative election in Gironde's 8th constituency
Candidate	Party	First round		Second round	
Candidate	Party	Votes	%	Votes	%
Yves Foulon	UMP	22,217	38.07%	30,043	51.10%
Nathalie Le Yondre	PS	21,036	36.05%	28,750	48.90%
Lydie Croizier	FN	6,282	10.76%		
Alain Rigolet	DVD	2,503	4.29%		
Vital Baude	EELV	2,133	3.65%		
Mélisande Elias	FG	1,998	3.42%		
Jean-Louis Apecarena	MRC	430	0.74%		
Elisabeth Rezer-Sandillon	Cap 21	391	0.67%		
Christian Meynard	AEI	382	0.65%		
France Sibert	DLR	359	0.62%		
Monique Nicolas	NPA	254	0.44%		
Marie-Elise Lorblancher	PCD	211	0.36%		
Solange Texier	LO	164	0.28%		
Valid votes		58,360	98.56%	58,793	97.02%
Spoilt and null votes		855	1.44%	1,807	2.98%
Votes cast / turnout		59,215	60.53%	60,600	61.94%
Abstentions		38,616	39.47%	37,231	38.06%
Registered voters		97,831	100.00%	97,831	100.00%

=== 2008 by-election ===
2008 by-election: Gironde's 8th constituency
Party	Candidate	Votes	%	±%
PS	François Deluga	19,884	43.80	
UMP	Yves Foulon	18,603	41.00	
DIV	Emmanuel Perrin	1,717	3.80	
DIV	Jacques Courmontagne	1,621	3.60	
Far left	Monique Nicolas	1,461	3.20	
PCF	Christian Darriet	1,048	2.30	
FN	Lydie Croizier	1,047	2.30	
Others	N/A	33		
Turnout		46,449	38.80	
2nd round result
PS	François Deluga	27,370	54.30	
UMP	Yves Foulon	23,054	45.70	
Turnout		51,968	43.40	
PS gain from UMP				

=== 2007 ===
Legislative Election 2007: Gironde's 8th constituency
Party	Candidate	Votes	%	±%
UMP	Marie-Hélène des Esgaulx	36,538	47.55	
PS	François Deluga	24,207	31.50	
MoDem	Sophie Mette	5,272	6.86	
FN	Lydie Croizier	2,119	2.76	
CPNT	Philippe Sebie	1,997	2.60	
LV	Elisabeth Rezer Sandillon	1,961	2.55	
Far left	Monique Nicolas	1,539	2.00	
Others	N/A	3,205		
Turnout		77,885	65.25	
2nd round result
UMP	Marie-Hélène des Esgaulx	40,852	54.13	
PS	François Deluga	34,614	45.87	
Turnout		77,487	64.92	
UMP hold				

=== 2002 ===
Legislative Election 2002: Gironde's 8th constituency
Party	Candidate	Votes	%	±%
PS	François Deluga	22,736	31.77	
UMP	Marie-Hélène des Esgaulx	19,234	26.88	
DVD	Yves Foulon	11,400	15.93	
FN	Colette Calichon	6,630	9.27	
CPNT	Victor Alcaraz	3,719	5.20	
LV	Michel Daverat	1,600	2.24	
Others	N/A	6,236		
Turnout		72,745	68.86	
2nd round result
UMP	Marie-Hélène des Esgaulx	34,982	52.52	
PS	François Deluga	31,627	47.48	
Turnout		69,023	65.34	
UMP gain from PS				

=== 1997 ===
Legislative Election 1997: Gironde's 8th constituency
Party	Candidate	Votes	%	±%
PS	François Deluga	20,505	33.06	
UDF	Robert Cazalet	15,355	24.76	
UDF	Claude Espied*	8,612	13.89	
FN	Colette Monier	7,796	12.57	
PCF	Pierre Cléaz	4,021	6.48	
DVD	Jack Hennequin	1,939	3.13	
Others	N/A	3,792		
Turnout		65,391	70.79	
2nd round result
PS	François Deluga	33,894	51.94	
UDF	Robert Cazalet	31,368	48.06	
Turnout		68,973	74.67	
PS gain from UDF				

* UDF dissident
