= Albert Likuvalu =

French politician

Apeleto Albert Likuvalu

President of the Territorial Assembly of Wallis and Futuna
- In office 22 February 2005 – 24 November 2005
- Preceded by: Patalione Kanimoa
- Succeeded by: Emeni Simete

Member of the French Parliament for Wallis and Futuna
- In office 20 June 2007 – 20 June 2012
- Preceded by: Victor Brial
- Succeeded by: David Vergé

Personal details
- Born: 14 November 1943 (age 82) Alo

Apeleto "Albert" Likuvalu (born 14 November 1943) is a politician from Wallis and Futuna.

He ran as a socialist candidate in 2002, receiving 928 votes in the first round and coming third. In 2005 after an alliance between the socialists and centre-right parties he was elected President of the Territorial Assembly of Wallis and Futuna. While president, he supported the Lavelua, Tomasi Kulimoetoke II, in his dispute with the French colonial government; as a result France's overseas territories minister Francois Baroin refused to meet with him. He was replaced as president of the assembly in November 2005, and later served as leader of the opposition.

He was elected to the National Assembly of France in the 2007 French legislative election, the second time that a socialist candidate had been elected from Wallis and Futuna. As a deputy he sat with the Socialist, Radical, Citizen and Miscellaneous Left group in the Assembly. He lost his seat in 2012.

He ran for the Senate in the 2020 French Senate election, coming third with 23% of the vote.
