= Karine Daniel =

French politician

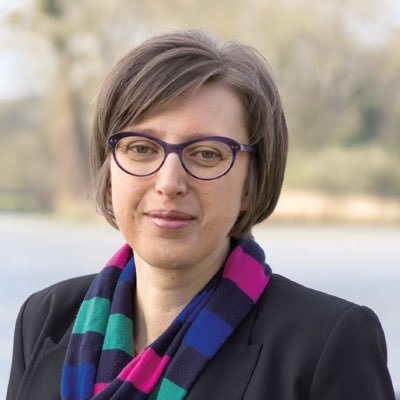
- Karine Daniel in 2016
- Parliamentary group: Socialist

Deputy for Loire-Atlantique's 3rd constituency in the National Assembly of France
- In office 25 April 2016 – 20 June 2017
- Preceded by: Jean-Marc Ayrault
- Succeeded by: Anne-France Brunet

Personal details
- Born: 22 June 1974 (age 51) Nantes

Karine Daniel, born 22 June 1974 in Nantes, is a French politician and economist. She was the deputy for Loire-Atlantique's 3rd constituency in the National Assembly of France from 2016 to 2017.

== Biography ==
Born to a farming family from Guémené-Penfao, she spent her youth in rural areas.

=== Education ===
She studied at the Guy-Mocquet high school in Châteaubriant, obtained a general university studies diploma (DEUG) at the University of Nantes, then a licentiate and master's degree in Montpellier. She also holds a diploma of in-depth studies (DEA) in the economics of the food system and the environment (1997, University of Montpellier 1), a doctorate in economics (2001, University Panthéon-Sorbonne) and completed a university year in Iowa in the United States. She was a teacher-researcher at the Higher School of Agriculture in Angers (ESA) and was accredited to supervise research (HDR, University of Angers).

=== Private life ===
Married, she has two daughters and lives in the Bellevue district, located between Nantes and Saint-Herblain.

== Political career ==
Daniel joined the Nantes-Ouest section of the Socialist Party (PS) in 2000. In 2008, she was elected from the Bellevue - Chantenay - Sainte-Anne district and as a deputy mayor of Nantes in charge of higher education, research, Europe and international relations. She was also vice-president of Nantes Metropolis responsible for international relations, Europe, higher education and research from 2012.

At the 77th congress of the Socialist Party [fr], she proposed Motion D, La Fabrique socialiste.

On 11 February 2016, Jean-Marc Ayrault was appointed Minister of Europe and Foreign Affairs. His substitute, Jean-Pierre Fougerat, having died, a by-election for Loire-Atlantique's 3rd constituency was held on 24 April. This was won by Karine Daniel with 55.44% of the vote against Mathieu Annereau. This victory was obtained with 75% of voters abstaining, and 12% of blank or null votes.

To avoid 'cumulation of mandates', she then resigned her municipal and metropolitan positions.

In the 2017 election, she was eliminated in the first round, behind the second round winner, Anne-France Brunet of LREM and also Martine Gourdon of La France Insoumise.

== Publications ==
- Karine Daniel and Lionel Fontagné (dir.) Politique agricole et localisation des activités dans l'Union européenne : une analyse en économie géographique (doctoral thesis in economic science), Paris, Université Panthéon-Sorbonne, 2001, 247 pages OCLC 492111967
- Karine Daniel, Localisation et dynamiques spatiales des activités agricoles et agro-alimentaires en France et en Europe : effets des politiques publiques' (mémoire d'habilitation à diriger des recherches en sciences économiques), Angers, University of Angers, 2013, 57 pages Available online
