= 2018 Wallis and Futuna's 1st constituency by-election =

- 15 April 2018
- Turnout: 83.02% ▲1.75%

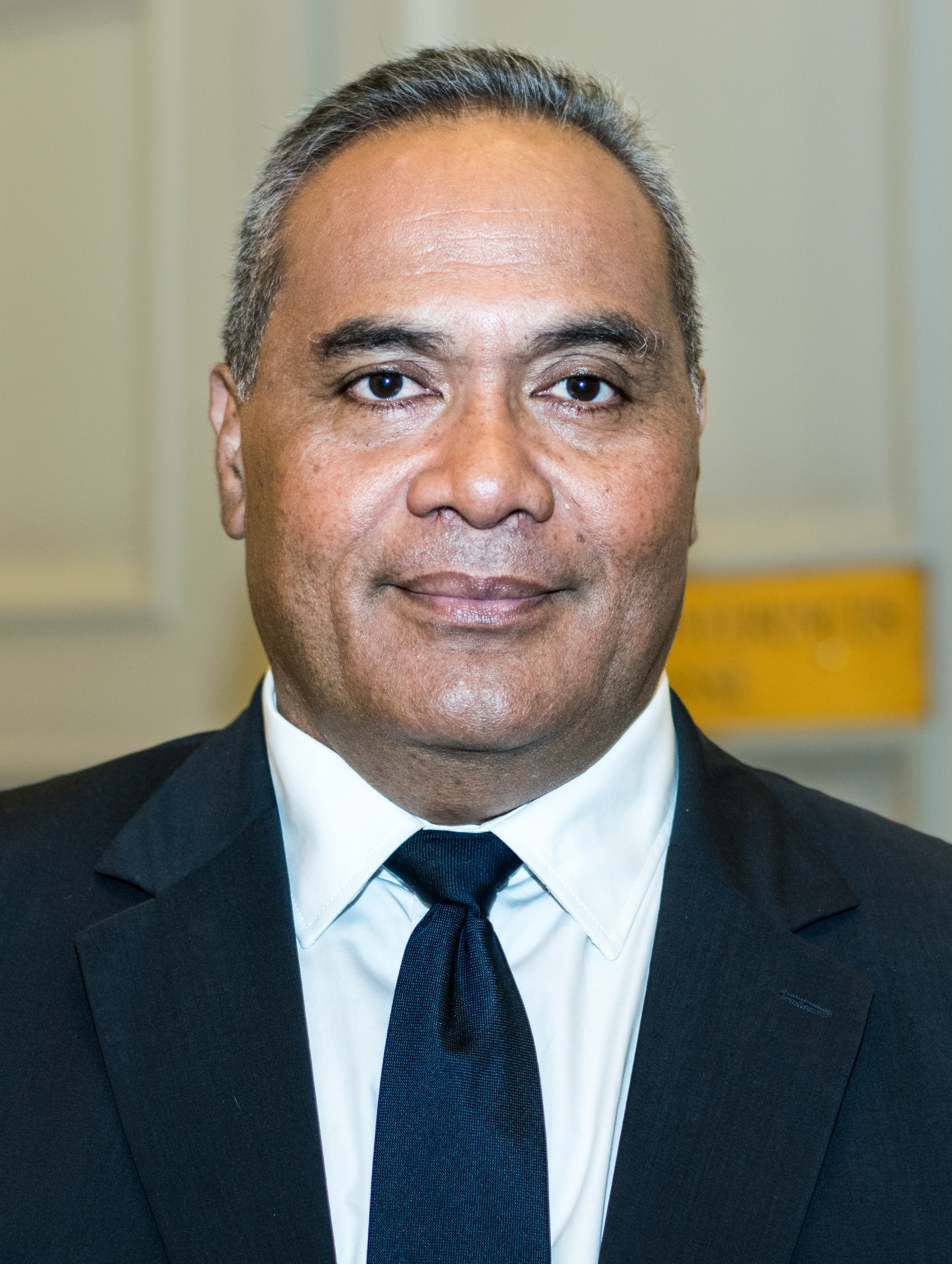
Nominee	Sylvain Brial	Napole Polutele
Party	Independent	Independent
1st round %	3,656; 51.61% ▲5.42%	3,428; 48.39% ▼1.85%
Deputy before election
Napole Polutele
DVD
Elected deputy
Sylvain Brial
DVD

A by-election was held in Wallis and Futuna's 1st constituency on 15 April 2018. The by-election was called after the Constitutional Council invalidated the election of Napole Polutele, miscellaneous left candidate in the June 2017 legislative elections and member of the UDI, Agir and Independents group in the National Assembly, on 2 February 2018. Sylvain Brial defeated outgoing deputy Polutele in the first round of the by-election on 15 April.

== Background ==
In the 2017 legislative elections, miscellaneous right candidate Napole Polutele was elected in the first round with 50.24% of the vote against another miscellaneous right candidate, Sylvain Brial, who obtained 46.19% of votes, and Hervé Michel of The Republicans (LR), who secured 3.57% of the vote. Polutele, one of four deputies elected in the first round of the legislative elections, sponsored the candidacy of Emmanuel Macron in the presidential election and announced that he would sit with the presidential majority in the National Assembly; he ultimately joined the Constructives group as a related member, having sat as a member of the Socialist group in the previous legislature.

After the election, Sylvain Brial decided to appeal the result to the Constitutional Council, claiming to have discovered irregularities in electoral lists and proxy votes. On 2 February 2018, the constitutional council ruled to void the election of Polutele. Under article L. 64 of the electoral code, should a voter be unable to sign the electoral roll at a polling station, the signature affixed, as required the third paragraph of article L. 62-1, should read "l'électeur ne peut signer lui-même" ("the voter cannot sign themselves") and be provided by a voter of their choice. However, 36 voters merely inscribed a "single cross" that could not be considered a signature, in addition to one voter unable to sign themselves whose vote was accompanied by the signature of another voter. Furthermore, 21 proxy votes were discarded under article R. 75 of the electoral code, either because no signature was given, or because a cross was provided rather than a signature. Because 57 votes were deducted and Polutele avoided a second round by only 16 votes, the constitutional council invalidated the election, triggering a by-election within three months.

On 2 March 2018, the first round of the by-election was scheduled for 15 April 2018, with a second round on 22 April if no candidate secured a majority of votes in the first round.

After his defeat, Polutele filed an appeal with the constitutional council on 26 April.

== 2017 election result ==
Candidate	Party	First round	
Candidate	Party	Votes	%
Napole Polutele	DVD	3,436	50.24
Sylvain Brial	DVD	3,159	46.19
Hervé Michel Delord	LR	244	3.57
Votes		6,839	100.00
Valid votes		6,839	99.23
Blank votes		31	0.45
Null votes		22	0.32
Turnout		6,892	81.27
Abstentions		1,588	18.73
Registered voters		8,480	
Source: Ministry of the Interior

== 2018 by-election result ==
Candidate	Party	First round		
Candidate	Party	Votes	%	+/–
Sylvain Brial	DVD	3,656	51.61	+5.42
Napole Polutele	DVD	3,428	48.39	–1.85
Votes		7,084	100.00	–
Valid votes		7,084	99.45	+0.22
Blank votes		20	0.28	–0.17
Null votes		19	0.27	–0.05
Turnout		7,123	83.02	+1.75
Abstentions		1,457	16.98	–1.75
Registered voters		8,580		
Source: Préfecture de Wallis et Futuna
