= Siliako Lauhea =

Wallisian politician

President of the Territorial Assembly of Wallis and Futuna
- In office 7 December 2010 – November / December 2011
- Preceded by: Victor Brial
- Succeeded by: Pesamino Taputai

Member of the Wallis and Futuna Territorial Assembly for Mua District

Siliako Lauhea is a Wallisian politician and former member of the Territorial Assembly of Wallis and Futuna. He was President of the Territorial Assembly from December 2010 to November/December 2011.

He was elected President of the Territorial Assembly on 7 December 2010, succeeding Victor Brial. He lost his seat at the 2012 election.

After leaving politics he became president of the Association of Pensioners of Wallis and Futuna.
