= Victor Brial =

Wallisian politician

President of the Territorial Assembly of Wallis and Futuna
- In office 11 December 2007 – 7 December 2010
- Preceded by: Pesamino Taputai
- Succeeded by: Siliako Lauhea
- In office 16 March 1997 – 14 January 1999
- Preceded by: Keleto Lakalaka
- Succeeded by: Soane Mani Uhila

Member of the Wallis and Futuna Territorial Assembly for Sigave

Member of the French National Assembly for Wallis and Futuna's constituency
- In office 12 June 1997 – 19 June 2007
- Preceded by: Kamilo Gata
- Succeeded by: Albert Likuvalu

Personal details
- Born: 9 April 1966 Sigave, Wallis and Futuna
- Party: Rally for the Republic

Victor Brial (born 9 April 1966) is a Wallisian politician. He represented Wallis and Futuna in the French National Assembly from 1997 to 2007 and was president of the Territorial Assembly of Wallis and Futuna twice, first from 1997 to 1999, and again from 2007 to 2010.

Brial is from Sigave and is from a prominent political family. His grandmother was Aloisia Brial, Lavelua (queen) of Uvéa from 1954 to 1958, and his father is politician Cyprien Brial, who served in the Territorial Assembly of Wallis and Futuna from 1967 to 1987. His brothers are former territorial councilor Julien Brial and former MP Sylvain Brial. His uncle Benjamin Brial was also a member of the National Assembly, while his cousin Gil Brial is involved in the politics of New Caledonia. He worked as a company director, and as parliamentary assistant to Senator Sosefo Makapé Papilio from 1987 to 1990.

He was first elected as President of the Territorial Assembly following the 1997 Wallis and Futuna Territorial Assembly election, serving until 14 January 1999. He was elected to the French National Assembly at the 1997 French legislative election. He was re-elected to the French National Assembly at the 2002 election, but on 19 December 2002 his election was invalidated by the Constitutional Council. He contested the resulting byelection and was re-elected in March 2003. He lost his seat to Albert Likuvalu at the 2007 election.

He was appointed to the board of directors of the Wallis-and-Futuna health agency in February 2002, and again in March 2006 and May 2008. He was appointed as Wallis and Futuna's representative to the supervisory board of the Institut d'émission d'outre-mer in May 2005 and October 2009. He was named a Knight of the Legion of Honour on 13 July 2008.

In December 2007 he was again elected as President of the Territorial Assembly. He served until December 2010, when he was succeeded by Siliako Lauhea. In June 2011, he was given a 4-month suspended prison sentence for concealment of misuse of corporate assets. He lost his seat at the 2012 election.
