= Loire-Atlantique's 3rd constituency =

Constituency of the National Assembly of France

3rd constituency of Loire-Atlantique
- inline Constituency of the National Assembly of France

- Constituency in Department

- Location of Loire-Atlantique in France
- Deputy: Ségolène Amiot; LFI
- Department: Loire-Atlantique
- Cantons: Nantes V, Nantes XI, Saint-Etienne-de-Montluc, Saint-Herblain Est, Saint-Herblain Ouest-Indre

The 3rd constituency of Loire-Atlantique is a French legislative constituency in the Loire-Atlantique département. Like the other 576 French constituencies, it elects one MP using the two-round system, with a run-off if no candidate receives over 50% of the vote in the first round.

== Description ==
Its representative from 1988 to 2016 was Jean-Marc Ayrault, the former Prime Minister of France (2012–2014). His return to the government prompted a by-election which was won by Karine Daniel. It includes part of the city of Nantes.

== Historic representation ==
| Election | Member | Party |
|---|---|---|
| 1988 | Jean-Marc Ayrault | PS |
| 1993 | Jean-Marc Ayrault | PS |
| 1997 | Jean-Marc Ayrault | PS |
| 2002 | Jean-Marc Ayrault | PS |
| 2007 | Jean-Marc Ayrault | PS |
| 2012 | Jean-Marc Ayrault | PS |
| 2012 | Jean-Pierre Fougerat (Note: Substitute, replaced Jean-Marc Ayrault while he was Prime Minister) | PS |
| 2014 | Jean-Marc Ayrault | PS |
| 2016 | Karine Daniel (Note: by-election on Jean-Marc Ayrault's return to the government, required due to the death of Jean-Pierre Fougerat) | PS |
| 2017 | Anne-France Brunet | LREM |
| 2022 | Ségolène Amiot | LFI |
| 2024 | Ségolène Amiot | LFI |

Table Notes

== Election results ==
=== 2024 ===
| Candidate | Party | Alliance | First round | | | Second round | | |
| Candidate | Party | Alliance | Votes | % | +/– | Votes | % | +/– |
|---|---|---|---|---|---|---|---|---|
| Ségolène Amiot | LFI | NFP | 29,285 | 44.55 | +1.68 | 32,216 | 50.13 | -5.57 |
| Matthieu Annereau | REN | Ensemble | 16,147 | 24.57 | -4.73 | 18,099 | 28.16 | -16.14 |
| Laurie Arc | RN | | 13,425 | 20.43 | +10.52 | 13,946 | 21.70 | new |
| Sophie Van Goethem | LR | UDC | 4,143 | 6.30 | +0.54 | | | |
| Gildas Perrot | REG | | 1,896 | 2.88 | +0.99 | | | |
| Hélène Dolidon | LO | | 832 | 1.27 | +0.18 | | | |
| Votes | | | 65,716 | 100.00 | | 64,261 | 100.00 | |
| Valid votes | | | 65,716 | 97.69 | +0.30 | 64,261 | 97.22 | +2.94 |
| Blank votes | | | 1,242 | 1.85 | -0.30 | 1,574 | 2.38 | -2.21 |
| Null votes | | | 315 | 0.47 | +0.01 | 262 | 0.40 | -0.73 |
| Turnout | | | 67,273 | 69.08 | +19.58 | 66,097 | 67.85 | +18.97 |
| Abstentions | | | 30,116 | 30.92 | -19.58 | 31,313 | 32.15 | -18.97 |
| Registered voters | | | 97,389 | | | 97,410 | | |
| Result | | | LFI HOLD | | | | | |

=== 2022 ===
Legislative Election 2022: Loire-Atlantique's 3rd constituency
| Party | Candidate | Votes | % | ±% |
|---|---|---|---|---|
| LFI (NUPÉS) | Ségolène Amiot | 19,990 | 42.87 | +4.35 |
| LREM (Ensemble) | Anne-France Brunet | 13,662 | 29.30 | -9.35 |
| RN | Véronique Jarry | 4,622 | 9.91 | +3.39 |
| LR (UDC) | Sophie Van Goethem | 2,686 | 5.76 | −2.95 |
| REC | Thibault Fauchait | 1,523 | 3.27 | N/A |
| UDB | Gwenvaël Duret | 1,271 | 2.73 | N/A |
| Others | N/A | 2,875 | 6.17 | |
| Turnout | | 46,629 | 49.50 | −2.70 |
2nd round result
| LFI (NUPÉS) | Ségolène Amiot | 24,837 | 55.70 | +11.96 |
| LREM (Ensemble) | Anne-France Brunet | 19,752 | 44.30 | −11.96 |
| Turnout | | 44,589 | 48.88 | +5.41 |
| LFI gain from LREM | | | | |

=== 2017 ===
| Candidate | Label | First round | | Second round | |
| Candidate | Label | Votes | % | Votes | % |
|---|---|---|---|---|---|
| Anne-France Brunet | REM | 18,301 | 38.65 | 20,746 | 56.26 |
| Martine Gourdon | FI | 7,921 | 16.73 | 16,132 | 43.74 |
| Karine Daniel | PS | 6,510 | 13.75 | | |
| Rozenn Hamel | LR | 4,122 | 8.71 | | |
| Judith Leray | ECO | 3,341 | 7.06 | | |
| Eléonore Revel | FN | 3,088 | 6.52 | | |
| Chantal Durand | DLF | 639 | 1.35 | | |
| Robin Salecroix | PCF | 465 | 0.98 | | |
| Gwenvaël Duret | REG | 463 | 0.98 | | |
| Sylvie Boulé | DIV | 429 | 0.91 | | |
| Michaël Protat | DIV | 348 | 0.74 | | |
| Alain Parisot | DIV | 328 | 0.69 | | |
| Hélène Dolidon | EXG | 305 | 0.64 | | |
| Michaël Hervé | DVG | 305 | 0.64 | | |
| Pierre Sabattier | DVD | 297 | 0.63 | | |
| Régis Tersiquel | DIV | 253 | 0.53 | | |
| Dominique Norval | PRG | 128 | 0.27 | | |
| Olivier Terrien | EXG | 103 | 0.22 | | |
| Votes | | 47,346 | 100.00 | 36,878 | 100.00 |
| Valid votes | | 47,346 | 98.40 | 36,878 | 92.04 |
| Blank votes | | 653 | 1.36 | 2,611 | 6.52 |
| Null votes | | 115 | 0.24 | 577 | 1.44 |
| Turnout | | 48,114 | 52.20 | 40,066 | 43.47 |
| Abstentions | | 44,055 | 47.80 | 52,103 | 56.53 |
| Registered voters | | 92,169 | | 92,169 | |
Source: Ministry of the Interior

=== 2016 by-election ===
Following the return of Jean-Marc Ayrault to the government and the death of his substitute Jean-Pierre Fougerat, a by-election was held on the Sundays 17 and 24 April 2016.

Results of by-election 17 and 24 April 2016 for Loire-Atlantique's 3rd constituency
| Candidate | Party | 1st round | | | Second round | |
| Candidate | Party | Votes | % | ± (2012) | Votes | % |
|---|---|---|---|---|---|---|
| Karine Daniel | PS | 6,573 | 30.41 | 25.80 | 11,142 | 55.44 |
| Matthieu Annereau | LR | 5,088 | 23.54 | + 0.70 | 8,956 | 44.56 |
| Jean-François Tallio | EELV | 3,686 | 17.05 | + 10.87 | | |
| Eléonore Revel | FN | 2,442 | 11.30 | + 2.88 | | |
| Gilles Bontemps | PCF | 1,089 | 5.04 | + 0.15 | | |
| Philippe Abarnou | DLF | 875 | 4.05 | + 4.05 | | |
| Mary Haway | ND | 650 | 3.01 | + 3.01 | | |
| Eddy Le Beller | LO | 578 | 2.67 | + 2.30 | | |
| Nicolas Rousseaux | Groupe Républicain | 399 | 1.85 | + 1.85 | | |
| Olivier Terrien | Communist | 232 | 1.07 | + 0.63 | | |
| Francis Meynier | Independent | 3 | 0.01 | + 0.01 | | |
| Registered Voters | | 88,574 | 100.00 | | 88,571 | 100.00 |
| Abstentions | | 65,996 | 74.51 | | 65,745 | 74.22 |
| Voters | | 22,578 | 25.49 | | 22,826 | 25.77 |
| Blank votes | | 623 | 3.38 | | 2,053 | 8.99 |
| Null votes | | 200 | 0.89 | | 675 | 2.95 |
| Valid votes | | 21,615 | 95.73 | | 20,098 | 88.04 |

=== 2012 ===
2012 legislative election in Loire-Atlantique's 3rd constituency
| Candidate | Party | First round | |
| Candidate | Party | Votes | % |
|---|---|---|---|
| Jean-Marc Ayrault | PS | 28,589 | 56.21% |
| Annick Le Ridant | UMP | 9,128 | 17.95% |
| Christian Bouchet | FN | 4,284 | 8.42% |
| Jean-François Tallio | EELV | 3,144 | 6.18% |
| Marie-Annick Benatre | FG | 2,486 | 4.89% |
| Emilia Neto | MoDem | 1,436 | 2.82% |
| Patricia Rio | MPF | 641 | 1.26% |
| Bruno Jarry | AEI | 395 | 0.78% |
| Bruno Herve | NPA | 345 | 0.68% |
| Chantal Girardin | Communistes | 223 | 0.44% |
| Hélène Dolidon | LO | 186 | 0.37% |
| Valid votes | | 50,857 | 98.83% |
| Spoilt and null votes | | 602 | 1.17% |
| Votes cast / turnout | | 51,459 | 57.97% |
| Abstentions | | 37,304 | 42.03% |
| Registered voters | | 88,763 | 100.00% |

=== 2007 ===
Legislative Election 2007: Loire-Atlantique's 3rd constituency
| Party | Candidate | Votes | % | ±% |
|---|---|---|---|---|
| PS | Jean-Marc Ayrault | 26,212 | 49.76 | |
| UMP | Sophie Jozan | 14,075 | 26.72 | |
| MoDem | Eric Menard | 3,073 | 5.83 | |
| LV | Catherine Choquet | 2,756 | 5.23 | |
| Far left | Delphine Vince | 1,322 | 2.51 | |
| MPF | Patricia Rio | 1,266 | 2.33 | |
| Others | N/A | 2,995 | | |
| Turnout | | 53,382 | 61.32 | |
2nd round result
| PS | Jean-Marc Ayrault | 32,770 | 66.15 | |
| UMP | Sophie Jozan | 16,769 | 33.85 | |
| Turnout | | 50,654 | 58.19 | |
| PS hold | | | | |

=== 2002 ===
Legislative Election 2002: Loire-Atlantique's 3rd constituency
| Party | Candidate | Votes | % | ±% |
|---|---|---|---|---|
| PS | Jean-Marc Ayrault | 25,626 | 50.09 | |
| UMP | Jean Baillet | 12,200 | 23.85 | |
| FN | Xavier Coste | 3,144 | 6.15 | |
| UDF | Fabienne Boureau | 2,097 | 4.10 | |
| LV | Patric Naizain | 1,545 | 3.02 | |
| PCF | Gilles Bontemps | 1,193 | 2.33 | |
| Others | N/A | 5,357 | | |
| Turnout | | 51,954 | 64.09 | |
| PS hold | | | | |

=== 1997 ===
Legislative Election 1997: Loire-Atlantique's 3rd constituency
| Party | Candidate | Votes | % | ±% |
|---|---|---|---|---|
| PS | Jean-Marc Ayrault | 23,211 | 45.84 | |
| UDF | Jean-Luc Harousseau | 11,144 | 22.01 | |
| FN | Arnaud de Perier | 5,326 | 10.52 | |
| PCF | Christian Pelloquet | 3,471 | 6.85 | |
| DVE | François de Rugy | 1,961 | 3.87 | |
| LO | Hélène Defrance | 1,601 | 3.16 | |
| DVD | Laurent Desjars | 1,128 | 2.23 | |
| Others | N/A | 2,798 | | |
| Turnout | | 52,607 | 66.20 | |
2nd round result
| PS | Jean-Marc Ayrault | 33,371 | 66.73 | |
| UDF | Jean-Luc Harousseau | 16,640 | 33.27 | |
| Turnout | | 52,265 | 65.77 | |
| PS hold | | | | |

== References & Sources ==
- Official results of French elections from 1998: "Résultats électoraux officiels en France" (in French). Archived from the original on 20 December 2011.
