= Pesamino Taputai =

Wallisian politician (born 1949)

President of the Territorial Assembly of Wallis and Futuna
- In office November / December 2011 – 4 April 2012
- Preceded by: Siliako Lauhea
- Succeeded by: Vetelino Nau
- In office 11 April 2007 – 11 December 2007
- Preceded by: Emeni Simete
- Succeeded by: Victor Brial

Member of the Wallis and Futuna Territorial Assembly for Hahake

Pesamino Taputai (born 20 March 1949) is a Wallisian politician and former member of the Territorial Assembly of Wallis and Futuna. He was President of the Territorial Assembly twice, from April to December 2007, and from 2011 to 2012.

He was first elected President of the Assembly in April 2007. He was succeeded in December 2007 by Victor Brial.

He stood for the French National Assembly in the 2007 French legislative election, but was eliminated in the first round.

He lost his seat at the 2012 election.
