= People's Union for Wallis and Futuna =

French political party in Wallis and Futuna

The People's Union for Wallis and Futuna (French: Union populaire pour Wallis-et-Futuna) is a political party in the French overseas collectivity of Wallis and Futuna. In the 2002 Territorial Assembly election, it won 6 out of 20 seats in the Territorial Assembly.
