= Henry Loste =

French politician

Henry Loste (May 27, 1899 in Bordeaux - June 16, 1978 in Mérignac) is a former senator of Wallis and Futuna. He was elected on September 23, 1962, and his term ended October 1, 1971.

== See also ==
- List of senators of Wallis and Futuna
