= Marie-Hélène des Esgaulx =

French politician

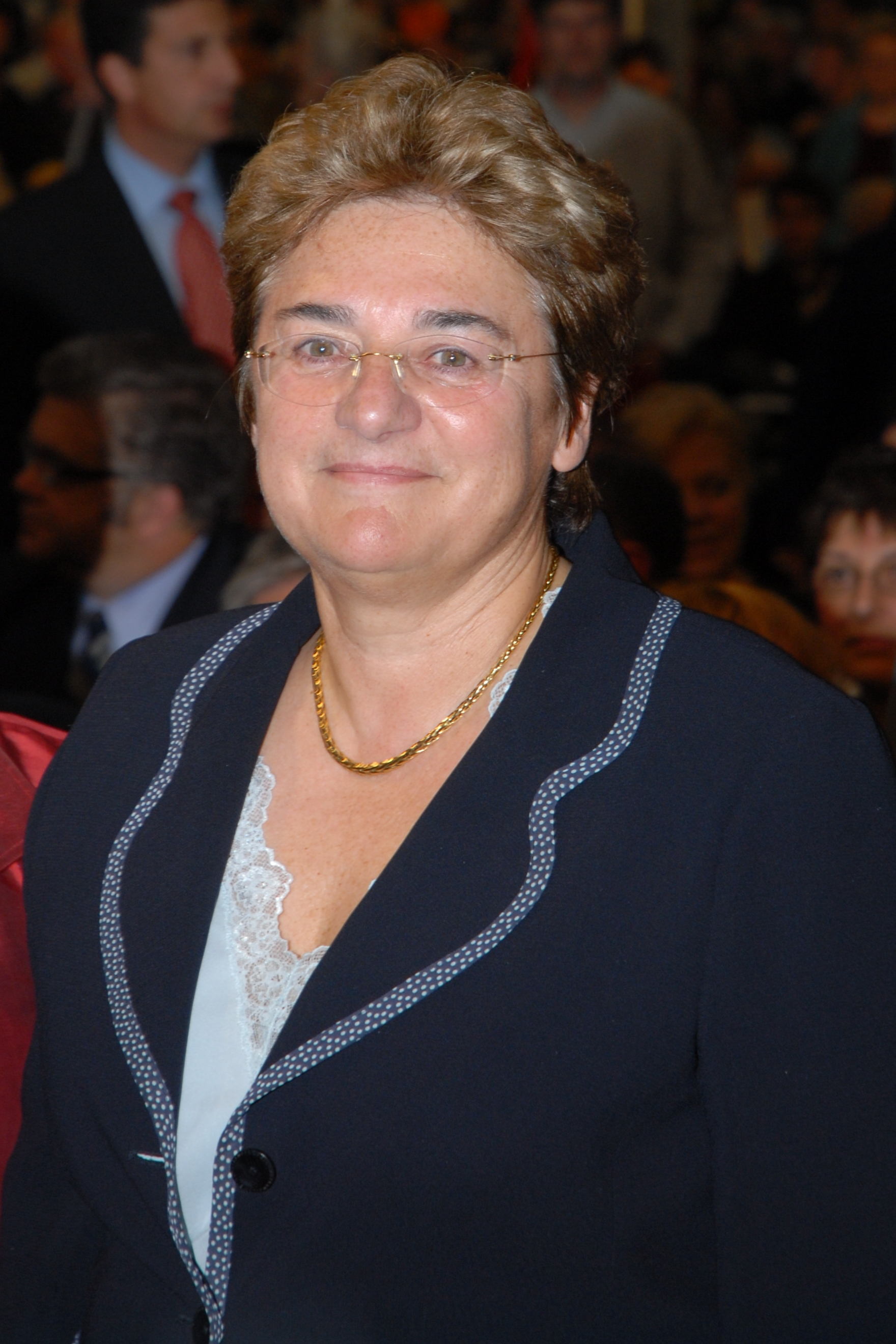
Marie-Hélène des Esgaulx

Marie-Hélène des Esgaulx (born 26 May 1950 in Dax, Landes) is a French politician, a former deputy in the National Assembly from 2002 to 2008 and a member of the Senate of France from 2008 to 2017. She represented the Gironde department and is a member of Les Républicains, formerly the Union for a Popular Movement Party. From 2006 to 2026, she served as mayor of Gujan-Mestras.

== Bibliography ==
- Page on the Senate website
