= Robert Laufoaulu =

Wallisian politician, former French senator (1998–2020)

Senator for Wallis and Futuna
- In office 27 September 1998 – 30 September 2020
- Preceded by: Basile Tui
- Succeeded by: Mikaele Kulimoetoke

Personal details
- Born: 7 July 1947 (age 78)
- Party: Rally for the Republic; Union for a Popular Movement; Les Republicans; The Independents – Republic and Territories group

Robert Laufoaulu (born 7 July 1947) is a Wallisian politician. He represented Wallis and Futuna in the Senate of France from 1998 to 2020.

A teacher by profession, Laufoaulu was first elected to the Senate in 1998. He was not one of the six candidates in the first round, who all sat in the territorial assembly, but was nominated for the second round by the alliance of parties opposed to candidate Kamilo Gata, former deputy for Wallis-and-Futuna. He won the second round by 14 votes to 7.

He was re-elected in the first round in the Senatorial elections of 2008 and 2014. In the Senate he sat as a member of Rally for the Republic, then the Union for a Popular Movement, then Les Republicans, before joining The Independents – Republic and Territories group in 2018. In 2016, he was financially sanctioned for absenteeism.

In the 2016 Republicans presidential primary he supported Alain Juppé. In the first round of the 2017 French presidential election he supported François Fillon, who obtained 28.5% of the vote in Wallis and Futuna, against 20% nationally.

He stood for re-election in 2020, but was defeated by Mikaele Kulimoetoke in the second round.
