= Mikaele Kulimoetoke =

French politician

Senator for Wallis and Futuna
- Incumbent
- Assumed office 30 September 2020
- Preceded by: Robert Laufoaulu

President of the Territorial Assembly of Wallis and Futuna
- In office 26 November 2014 – 26 April 2017
- Preceded by: Petelo Hanisi
- Succeeded by: David Vergé

Member of the Wallis and Futuna Territorial Assembly for Hahake
- Incumbent
- Assumed office 25 March 2012

Personal details
- Born: 17 June 1963 (age 62)
- Party: Rally of Democrats, Progressive and Independents

Mikaele Kulimoetoke (born 17 June 1963) is a Wallisian politician and member of the Territorial Assembly of Wallis and Futuna. He was president of the Territorial Assembly of Wallis and Futuna from 2014 to 2017. He has represented Wallis and Futuna in the Senate of France since 2020.

Kulimoetoke is grandson of King Tomasi Kulimoetoke II. Before entering politics he worked as a police officer.

He was first elected to the Territorial Assembly in the 2012 Wallis and Futuna Territorial Assembly election, representing the Hahake District. He was elected vice-president of the assembly. He subsequently ran for the French National Assembly in the 2012 French legislative election, but lost narrowly to David Vergé in the second round. After the election result was annulled, he contested the 2013 by-election, but was defeated by Napole Polutele.

In November 2014 he was elected President of the Territorial Assembly of Wallis and Futuna. He was re-elected on 22 December 2015, and held the office for the rest of the Assembly's term. During his term he clashed with Marcel Renouf, the Administrator Superior of Wallis and Futuna, over the budget and the application of some measures, in an effort to have executive power transferred to the President of the Assembly.

He was re-elected to the Assembly in the 2017 Wallis and Futuna Territorial Assembly election, coming second in his district, but lost the presidency to David Vergé.

He stood for the Senate of France in the 2020 French Senate election, defeating incumbent Robert Laufoaulu in the second round. His campaign accounts were invalidated due to irregularities on April 19, 2021, but the Constitutional Council did not cancel his election. As a Senator, he has advocated for the revision of the 1961 statute governing Wallis and Futuna, to vest executive power in the president of the territorial assembly. In the context of the COVID-19 pandemic in Wallis and Futuna, he opposes vaccination.

He was re-elected to the Territorial Assembly in the 2022 Wallis and Futuna Territorial Assembly election.
