= Atoloto Kolokilagi =

Wallisian politician

President of the Territorial Assembly of Wallis and Futuna
- In office 29 November 2019 – 26 November 2020
- Preceded by: David Vergé
- Succeeded by: Nivaleta Iloai

Atoloto Kolokilagi is a Wallisian politician and member of the Territorial Assembly of Wallis and Futuna. He was president of the Territorial Assembly of Wallis and Futuna from 2019 to 2020.

On 29 November 2019 he was elected president of the Assembly, defeating Nivaleta Iloai by 10 votes to 9. In February 2020 he visited France to discuss the upcoming France-Oceania summit and the Nouméa Accord.
