= Munipoese Muliʻakaʻaka =

Wallisian politician

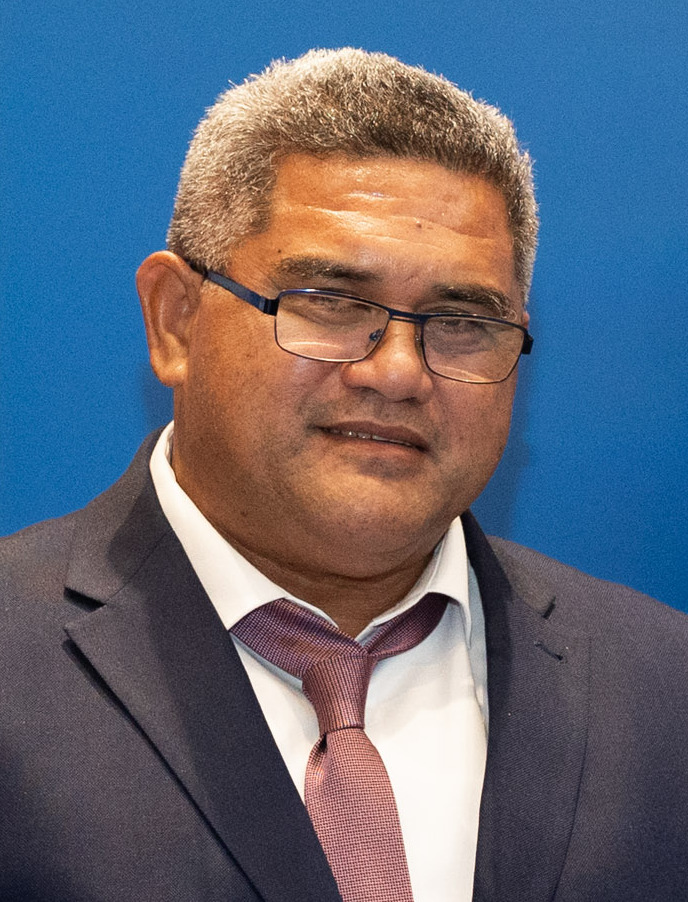
- Munipoese Muli’aka’aka in 2024

President of the Territorial Assembly of Wallis and Futuna
- Incumbent
- Assumed office 25 March 2022
- Preceded by: Nivaleta Iloai

Member of the Wallis and Futuna Territorial Assembly for Mua District
- Incumbent
- Assumed office 25 March 2012

Munipoese Muliʻakaʻaka (born ~1974) is a Wallisian politician and member of the Territorial Assembly of Wallis and Futuna. He was unanimously elected president of the Territorial Assembly of Wallis and Futuna in March 2022.
