= Napole Polutele =

French politician

Napole Polutélé
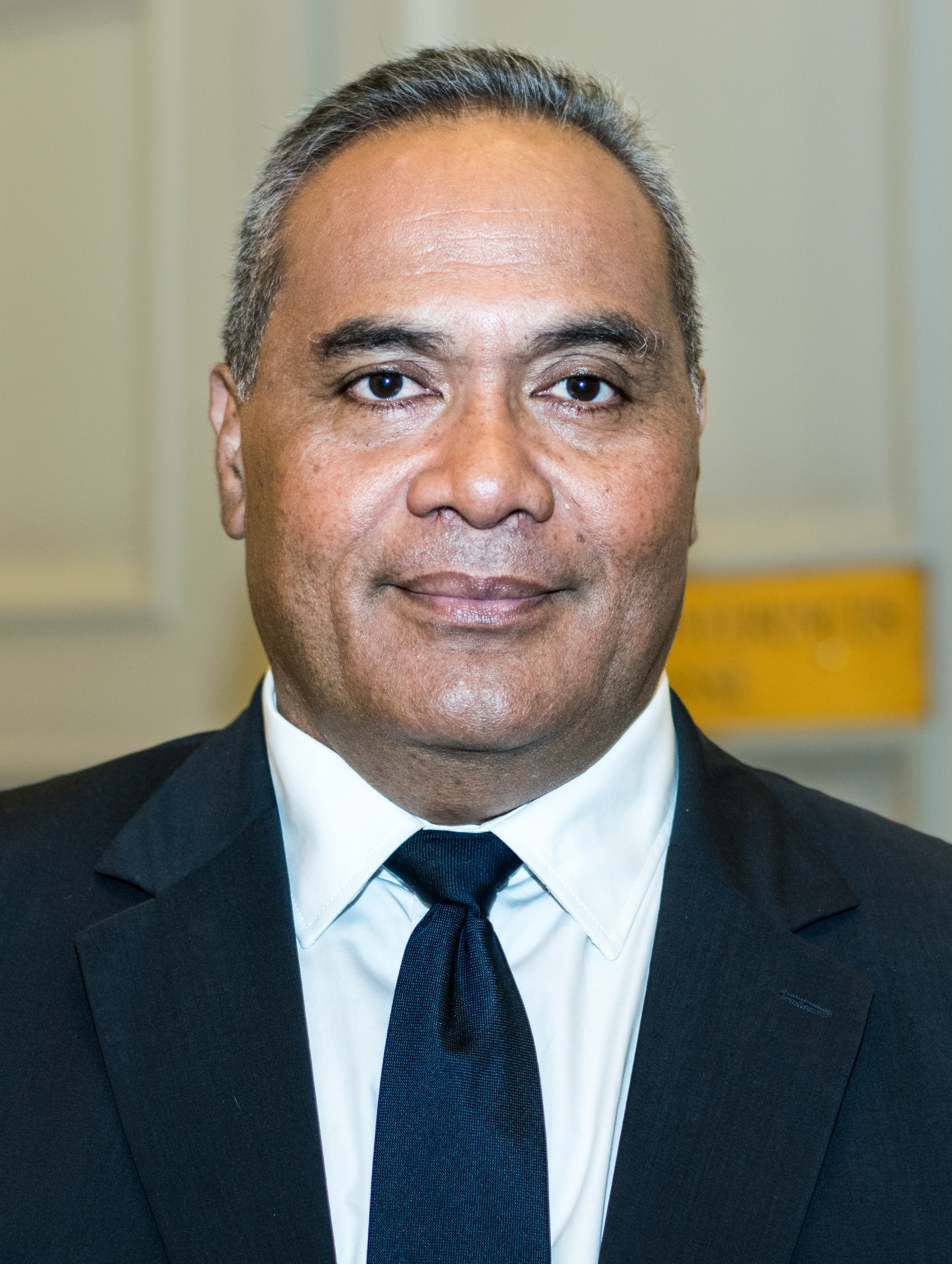
- Polutélé in 2017

Member of the National Assembly for Wallis and Futuna
- In office 24 March 2013 – 2 February 2018
- Preceded by: David Vergé
- Succeeded by: Sylvain Brial
- Majority: 647 votes (5.2 %)

Personal details
- Born: 25 June 1965 (age 60) Mu'a, Uvea, Wallis and Futuna
- Party: none

Napole Polutélé (born 25 June 1965) is a French politician.

== Early life ==
Born on Wallis, he studied in metropolitan France in Toulouse and Bordeaux, then began a career as a secondary school history and geography teacher, first in Nouméa (New Caledonia) for a year, then in his home island.

== Career ==
He served as a member of the Territorial Assembly of Wallis and Futuna, before entering French national politics. He stood as a candidate in the 2013 by-election for Wallis and Futuna's seat in the French National Assembly. Although he stood as an independent, he was endorsed and supported by the right-wing Union for a Popular Movement (UMP). He was elected, in the second round on 24 March, with 37.5% of the vote, ahead of two candidates of the left. Two months later, having been elected to sit on the opposition benches (albeit officially as an independent), he joined the ranks of the Socialist-led majority in the National Assembly. He explained frankly that being a member of the majority would make it easier for him to lobby the government for funds and services for his constituents - who, he said, cared little for the left-right divide prevalent in metropolitan France. He subsequently sat as an independent on the benches of the left. Specifically, he promised to lobby for the setting up of a better sewerage system in the territory, and faster repairs following damage caused by a cyclone. His crossing the floor so soon after his election caused strong reactions within the UMP, with party leader Jean-François Copé describing it as "shocking" and the party's parliamentary leader Christian Jacob calling it "outrageous".

His re-election in June 2017 was annulled by the Constitutional Council on 2 February 2018, forcing a by-election.
