= Basile Tui =

Wallisian olitician

Basile Tui is a politician who was the leader of the Centrist Union group and was the third senator of Wallis and Futuna.

== Maastricht Treaty ==
Basile opposed of the Maastricht Treaty. Tui was concerned about the freedom of movement of peoples and goods. However, the treaty was eventually passed.

== Senate of Wallis and Futuna ==
Basile was elected to the senate of Wallis and Futuna on April 6, 1998, after Sosefo Makapé Papilio died. His term expired on September 30, 1998 and he was not re-elected.

== See also ==
- List of senators of Wallis and Futuna
