= Territorial Assembly of Wallis and Futuna =

Legislature

Type
- Type: Unicameral

Leadership
- President: Munipoese Muliʻakaʻaka since 25 March 2022

Structure
- Seats: 20
- Political groups: Government (11): DVG (10); PS (1); Opposition (9): Independent (5); DVC (3); DVD (1); LR (1)

Elections
- Voting system: Party-list proportional representation
- Last election: March 20, 2022

The Territorial Assembly of Wallis and Futuna (French: Assemblée Territoriale; Wallisian and Futunan: Fono fakatelituale) is the legislature of Wallis and Futuna. It consists of 20 members, elected for a five-year term by proportional representation in multi-seat constituencies. The Assembly sits in Mata Utu, the capital of the territory.

== History ==
The Assembly was established by Article 11 of the 1961 statute, which established Wallis and Futuna as an overseas territory.

== Elections ==
The territorial assembly consists of 20 members, elected for a five-year term by proportional representation in multi-seat constituencies. ʻUvea has 13 seats — 6 for the Mua District, 4 for the Hahake District, and 3 for the Hihifo District. Futuna has 7 seats, 4 for the Alo District and 3 for Sigave. The electoral system uses a closed list, with voters voting for a single party. The seats are distributed in each constituency using the highest averages method.

== Powers and procedures ==
The powers and competencies of the assembly are a modified version of those originally granted to the Congress of New Caledonia. It meets twice a year with an administrative session in the middle of the year and a budgetary session at the end of the year, for a maximum duration of 45 days each. Extraordinary sessions, not exceeding 15 days, can also take place. Debates can take place in French, Wallisian or Futunian. Interpreters are present and the reports can be written in the three languages.

=== Presidents of the Territorial Assembly ===
The assembly is headed by a president elected every year by its members after the opening of the budgetary session.

Name	Period
Paino Tu'ugahala	1962–1967
Sosefe Makapé Papillo	1967–1972
Mikaele Folaumahina	1972–1975
Soane Patita Lakina	1975–1977
Pasilio Tui	1977–1978
Manuele Lisahi	1978–1984
Pasilio Tui	1984–1986
Petelo Takatai	December 1986 – March 1987
Keleto Lakalala	March 1987 – December 1987
Falakiko Gata	December 1987 – 1988
Manuele Lisiahi	1988–1989
Pasilio Tui	1989–1990
Clovis Logologofolau	1990 – March 1992
Soane Mani Uhila	March 1992 – December 1994
Mikaele Tauhavili	December 1994 – 1996
Keleto Lakalaka	1996 – March 16, 1997
Victor Brial	March 16, 1997 – January 14, 1999
Soane Mani Uhila	January 14, 1999 – January 2001
Patalione Kanimoa	January 2001 – March 22, 2005
Apeleto Likuvalu	March 22, 2005 – November 23, 2005
Emeni Simete	November 23, 2005 – April 11, 2007
Pesamino Taputai	April 11, 2007 – December 11, 2007
Victor Brial	December 11, 2007 – 7 December 2010
Siliako Lauhea	7 December 2010 – Nov/Dec 2011
Pesamino Taputai	Nov/Dec 2011 – April 4, 2012
Vetelino Nau	April 4, 2012 – November 28, 2012
Sosefo Suve	November 28, 2012 – April 1, 2013
Nivaleta Iloai	April 1, 2013 – December 11, 2013
Petelo Hanisi	December 11, 2013 – November 26, 2014
Mikaele Kulimoetoke	November 26, 2014 – April 4, 2017
David Vergé	April 4, 2017 – November 29, 2019
Atoloto Kolokilagi	November 29, 2019 – November 26, 2020
Nivaleta Iloai	November 26, 2020 – March 25, 2022
Munipoese Muli’aka’aka	March 25, 2022 – present
