= List of by-elections to the 15th National Assembly of France =

By-elections to for the French National Assembly are held within three months after the invalidation of the election or resignation of a deputy. No by-elections are held within the twelve months of the end of a parliamentary cycle. Eight by-elections have been called since the inauguration of the 15th legislature of the French Fifth Republic.

== List ==
Dates	Constituency	Incumbent deputy	Party	Group	Elected deputy	Party	Reason for by-election	Ref(s)
28 Jan and 4 Feb 2018	Val-d'Oise's 1st	Isabelle Muller-Quoy	REM	REM	Antoine Savignat	LR	Election invalidated by the Constitutional Council	
28 Jan and 4 Feb 2018	Territoire de Belfort's 1st	Ian Boucard	LR	LR	Ian Boucard	LR	Election invalidated by the Constitutional Council	
4 Mar and 11 Mar 2018	French Guiana's 2nd	Lénaïck Adam	REM	REM	Lénaïck Adam	REM	Election invalidated by the Constitutional Council	
11 Mar and 18 Mar 2018	Haute-Garonne's 8th	Joël Aviragnet	PS	NG	Joël Aviragnet	PS	Election invalidated by the Constitutional Council	
18 Mar and 25 Mar 2018	Loiret's 4th	Jean-Pierre Door	LR	LR	Jean-Pierre Door	LR	Election invalidated by the Constitutional Council	
18 Mar and 25 Mar 2018	Mayotte's 1st	Ramlati Ali	PS	REM	Ramlati Ali	DVG	Election invalidated by the Constitutional Council	
8 Apr and 22 Apr 2018	French residents overseas' 5th	Samantha Cazebonne	REM	REM	Samantha Cazebonne	REM	Election invalidated by the Constitutional Council	
15 Apr 2018	Wallis and Futuna's 1st	Napole Polutele	DVG	UAI app.	Sylvain Brial	DVG	Election invalidated by the Constitutional Council	
23 Sep and 30 Sep 2018	Réunion's 7th	Thierry Robert	MoDem	MoDem	Jean-Luc Poudroux	DVD	Declared ineligible by the Constitutional Council	
18 Nov and 25 Nov 2018	Essonne's 1st	Manuel Valls	DVG	REM	Francis Chouat	DVG	Resignation	
Sep 2020	Seine-Maritime's 5th	Christophe Bouillon	PS	NG	Gérard Leseul	PS	Cumulation of mandates	
Sep 2020	Val-de-Marne's 9th	Luc Carvounas	PS	NG	Isabelle Santiago	PS	Cumulation of mandates	
Sep 2020	Yvelines's 11th	Nadia Hai	REM	REM			Resignation	
Sep 2020	Pas-de-Calais's 6th	Brigitte Bourguignon	REM	REM			Cumulation of mandates	
Sep 2020	Réunion's 2nd	Huguette Bello	PLR	GDR			Cumulation of mandates	
Sep 2020	Haut-Rhin's 1st	Éric Straumann	LR	LR			Cumulation of mandates	
Sep 2020	Maine-et-Loire's 3rd	Jean-Charles Taugourdeau	LR	LR			Cumulation of mandates	
May 2021

== Cumulative results ==
The changes displayed within the table below compare the results of by-elections up to the end of September 2018 to the outcome of the 2017 legislative elections within the constituencies where by-elections had been held till then. The classification of candidates and changes are based on the classification of candidates at the time. For example, in the 2018 by-election for French Guiana's 2nd constituency, Davy Rimane was classified as a regionalist candidate in 2017 and a candidate of La France Insoumise in 2018 (and a comparison therefore made with 2017 candidate Paul Persdam); in addition, Ramlati Ali was classified as a Socialist Party candidate in 2017 and miscellaneous left in 2018.

Party		First round			Second round			Seats	
Party		Votes	%	+/–	Votes	%	+/–	Total	+/–
The Republicans	LR	22,318	21.48	+7.16	35,274	34.95	+2.81	3	+1
La République En Marche!	REM	20,752	19.98	–5.57	28,528	28.27	–10.24	1	–1
Socialist Party	PS	13,699	13.19	+3.30	17,156	17.00	–1.08	1	–
La France Insoumise	FI	13,249	12.75	+4.65	8,107	8.03	+8.03	0	–
National Rally	RN	9,200	8.86	–5.96					
Miscellaneous left	DVG	7,352	7.08	+2.51	6,810	6.75	+6.75	1	–
Democratic Movement	MoDem	3,600	3.47	–1.01	5,039	4.99	–1.54	0	–
Debout la France	DLF	3,063	2.95	+1.92					
Europe Ecology – The Greens	EELV	2,488	2.40	+0.26					
French Communist Party	PCF	2,353	2.27	–1.86					
Miscellaneous right	DVD	1,988	1.91	–0.10					
Popular Republican Union	UPR	1,035	1.00	+0.19					
Lutte Ouvrière	LO	1,011	0.97	+0.26					
Party of France	PDF	699	0.67	+0.38					
The Patriots	LP	461	0.44	+0.44					
Ecologists	ECO	427	0.41	–0.34					
Far-right	EXD	93	0.09	–0.09					
Miscellaneous	DIV	92	0.09	–2.41					
Total		103,880	100.00	–	100,914	100.00	–	6	–
Valid votes		103,880	95.72	–0.79	100,914	90.30	+1.47		
Blank and null votes		4,646	4.28	+0.79	10,838	9.70	–1.47		
Turnout		108,526	29.44	–17.17	111,752	30.32	–12.55		
Abstentions		260,152	70.56	+17.17	256,798	69.68	+12.55		
Registered voters		368,678			368,550				
Source (1st round): Val-d'Oise, Territoire de Belfort, Guyane, Haute-Garonne, Loiret, Mayotte; Source (2nd round): Val-d'Oise, Territoire de Belfort, Guyane, Haute-Garonne, Loiret, Mayotte

== 2018 by-elections ==
=== Val-d'Oise's 1st constituency ===
First round results by commune in 2017

First round results by commune in 2018

Second round results by commune in 2017

Second round results by commune in 2018

Candidate	Party	First round			Second round		
Candidate	Party	Votes	%	+/–	Votes	%	+/–
Isabelle Muller-Quoy	REM	4,768	29.28	–6.65	6,762	48.55	–5.69
Antoine Savignat	LR–UDI	3,855	23.67	+5.92	7,167	51.45	+5.69
Leïla Saïb	FI	1,867	11.47	+1.34			
Stéphane Capdet	FN	1,647	10.11	–5.19			
Sandra Nguyen-Derosier	PS	1,121	6.88	+1.40			
Bénédicte Ariès	EELV	1,009	6.20	+2.33			
Jean-Paul Nowak	DLF	702	4.31	+4.31			
Huguette François	PDF	429	2.63	+1.36			
Brigitte Poli	PCF	320	1.97	–0.60			
Hélène Halbin	LO	204	1.25	+0.46			
Denise Cornet	LP	193	1.19	+1.19			
Christophe Hayes	UPR	169	1.04	+0.07			
Votes		16,284	100.00	–	13,929	100.00	–
Valid votes		16,284	97.24	–0.80	13,929	88.69	+0.77
Blank votes		332	2.04	+0.46	1,210	7.70	–1.79
Null votes		130	0.80	+0.35	567	3.61	+1.02
Turnout		16,746	20.33	–27.76	15,706	19.09	–20.51
Abstentions		65,607	79.67	+27.76	66,550	80.91	+20.51
Registered voters		82,353			82,256		
Source: Préfecture du Val d'Oise, Préfecture du Val d'Oise

=== Territoire de Belfort's 1st constituency ===
First round results by commune in 2017

First round results by commune in 2018

Second round results by commune in 2017

Second round results by commune in 2018

Candidate	Party	First round			Second round		
Candidate	Party	Votes	%	+/–	Votes	%	+/–
Ian Boucard	LR–UDI	5,266	39.02	+15.32	7,229	58.93	+8.17
Christophe Grudler	MoDem–REM	3,600	26.67	–5.16	5,039	41.07	–8.17
Anais Beltran	FI–MRC–PCF	1,568	11.62	–0.55			
Jean-Raphaël Sandri	FN	1,015	7.52	–9.98			
Vincent Jeudy	EELV	601	4.45	+4.45			
Julie Kohlenberg	DLF	515	3.82	+3.82			
Arthur Courty	PS	351	2.60	–6.50			
Sophie Montel	LP	268	1.99	+1.99			
Yves Fontanive	LO	214	1.59	+0.54			
Jonathan Vallart	UPR	99	0.73	–0.02			
Votes		13,497	100.00	–	12,268	100.00	–
Valid votes		13,497	96.39	–0.97	12,268	89.06	+1.47
Blank votes		339	2.42	–0.62	959	6.96	–1.73
Null votes		167	1.19	+0.35	548	3.98	–0.26
Turnout		14,003	29.51	–20.23	13,775	28.91	–15.35
Abstentions		33,451	70.49	+20.23	33,880	71.09	+15.35
Registered voters		47,454			47,655		
Source: Préfecture du Territoire de Belfort, Préfecture du Territoire de Belfort

=== French Guiana's 2nd constituency ===
First round results by commune in 2017

First round results by commune in 2018

Second round results by commune in 2017

Second round results by commune in 2018

Candidate	Party	First round			Second round		
Candidate	Party	Votes	%	+/–	Votes	%	+/–
Lénaïck Adam	REM–UDI	5,927	43.10	+6.65	8,320	50.65	+0.44
Davy Rimane	FI	4,830	35.12	+14.84	8,107	49.35	–0.44
David Riché	PSG	1,385	10.07	+10.07			
José Makébé	DVD	683	4.97	+4.97			
Richard Joigny	PPG	305	2.22	–3.58			
Jean-Philippe Dolor	DVG	271	1.97	+1.97			
Jérôme Harbourg	FN	248	1.80	+1.80			
Georges Mignot	UPR	104	0.76	–1.02			
Mylène Mazia	DVG	0	0.00	–			
Votes		13,753	100.00	–	16,427	100.00	–
Valid votes		13,753	97.47	+1.57	16,427	97.48	+1.47
Blank votes		183	1.30	–1.35	258	1.53	–0.80
Null votes		174	1.23	–0.22	166	0.67	–0.99
Turnout		14,110	34.76	+8.67	16,851	41.52	+6.42
Abstentions		26,477	65.24	–8.67	23,737	58.48	–6.42
Registered voters		40,587			40,588		
Source: Préfecture de la Guyane, Préfecture de la Guyane

=== Haute-Garonne's 8th constituency ===
Candidate	Party	First round			Second round		
Candidate	Party	Votes	%	+/–	Votes	%	+/–
Joël Aviragnet	PS	10,777	38.74	+20.96	17,156	70.30	+20.17
Michel Montsarrat	REM–UDI	5,651	20.31	–13.09	7,247	29.70	–20.17
Philippe Gimenez	FI	3,623	13.02	–1.08			
Marie-Christine Parolin	FN	3,264	11.73	–3.50			
Philippe Maurin	LR	1,374	4.94	–3.79			
Marie-Cécile Seigle-Vatte	EELV	878	3.16	+0.35			
Corinne Marquerie	PCF	733	2.63	–0.46			
Sébastien Broucke	DLF	706	2.54	+1.12			
Hervé Minec	UPR	297	1.07	+0.43			
Guy Jovelin	PDF	270	0.97	+0.97			
Martine Guiraud	LO	244	0.88	+0.20			
Francis Meynier	SE	2	0.01	+0.01			
Votes		27,819	100.00	–	24,403	100.00	–
Valid votes		27,819	94.82	–1.76	24,403	86.54	+1.13
Blank votes		1,518	5.28	+1.76	2,000	7.09	–2.01
Null votes		1,518	5.28	+1.76	1,794	6.36	+0.88
Turnout		29,337	34.41	–18.35	28,197	33.08	–14.13
Abstentions		55,916	65.59	+18.35	57,032	66.92	+14.13
Registered voters		85,253			85,229		
Source (1st round): Préfecture de la Haute-Garonne, Ministère de l'Intérieur; Second round: Préfecture de la Haute-Garonne, Ministère de l'Intérieur

=== Loiret's 4th constituency ===
First round results by commune in 2017

First round results by commune in 2018

Second round results by commune in 2017

Second round results by commune in 2018

Candidate	Party	First round			Second round		
Candidate	Party	Votes	%	+/–	Votes	%	+/–
Jean-Pierre Door	LR–UDI	8,330	38.20	+14.41	12,632	67.08	+17.07
Mélusine Harlé	REM	4,406	20.20	–8.35	6,199	32.92	–17.07
Ludovic Marchetti	FN	3,026	13.88	–6.91			
Jalila Gaboret	PS	1,450	6.65	+1.17			
Bruno Nottin	PCF–EELV	1,300	5.96	–5.64			
Luc Bucheton	DLF	1,140	5.23	+2.22			
Jérôme Schmitt	FI	1,081	4.96	+4.96			
Joël-Pierre Chevreux	ECO	427	1.96	+1.96			
Dominique Clergue	LO	349	1.60	+0.64			
Laurent Chaillou	UPR	177	0.81	+0.16			
Nicolas Rousseaux	EXD	93	0.43	+0.43			
Frédéric Chaouat	SE	29	0.13	+0.13			
Votes		21,808	100.00	–	18,831	100.00	–
Valid votes		21,808	96.97	–0.90	18,831	88.88	–1.05
Blank votes		442	1.97	+0.46	1,492	7.04	–0.11
Null votes		239	1.06	+0.44	865	4.08	+1.17
Turnout		22,489	30.36	–18.60	21,188	28.61	–14.76
Abstentions		51,574	69.64	+18.60	52,866	71.39	+14.76
Registered voters		74,063			74,054		
Source: Préfecture du Loiret

=== Mayotte's 1st constituency ===
First round results by commune in 2017

First round results by commune in 2018

Second round results by commune in 2017

Second round results by commune in 2018

Candidate	Party	First round			Second round		
Candidate	Party	Votes	%	+/–	Votes	%	+/–
Ramlati Ali	DVG	3,875	36.15	+19.31	8,246	54.77	+4.60
Elad Chakrina	LR	3,493	32.59	+15.83	6,810	45.23	–4.60
Bacar Ali Boto	DVG	1,338	12.48	–3.14			
Daniel Zaïdani	MDM	1,305	12.17	–1.22			
Abdullah Mikidadi	FI	280	2.61	+0.63			
Alexandre Alçuyet	UPR	189	1.76	+1.09			
Bacar Mouta	DVG	178	1.66	+1.66			
Boina Dinouraini	SE	61	0.57	–1.29			
Votes		10,719	100.00	–	15,056	100.00	–
Valid votes		10,719	90.52	+1.97	15,056	93.89	+1.69
Blank votes		460	3.88	–0.11	381	2.38	–0.88
Null votes		662	5.59	–1.86	598	3.73	–0.80
Turnout		11,841	30.39	–11.90	16,035	41.36	–4.15
Abstentions		27,127	69.61	+11.90	22,733	58.64	+4.15
Registered voters		38,968			38,768		
Source (1st round): Préfecture de Mayotte, Ministère de l'Intérieur; Source (2nd round): Préfecture de Mayotte, Ministère de l'Intérieur

=== French residents overseas' 5th constituency ===
Candidate	Party	First round			Second round		
Candidate	Party	Votes	%	+/–	Votes	%	+/–
Samantha Cazebonne	REM–MoDem–UDI	2,398	35.15	–15.21	3,623	53.96	–12.25
François Ralle-Andreoli	FI–EELV–PCF–G.s	1,941	28.45	+12.93	3,091	46.04	+12.25
Raphaël Chambat	LR–LC–CPNT	952	13.95	–1.15			
Jean-Laurent Poitevin	DVD	511	7.49	+7.49			
Mehdi Benlahcen	PS	510	7.47	–0.66			
Ludovic Lemoues	EXD	275	4.03	+3.28			
Yohann Castro	DVD	122	1.79	+1.79			
Michel Hunault	DVD	63	0.92	+0.92			
Samir Sahraoui	SE	51	0.75	+0.75			
Votes		6,823	100.00	–	6,714	100.00	–
Valid votes		6,823	98.03	–1.15	6,714	95.26	–0.39
Blank votes		87	1.25	+0.76	203	2.88	–0.49
Null votes		50	0.72	+0.39	131	1.86	+0.89
Turnout		6,960	7.87	–8.07	7,048	7.97	–5.57
Abstentions		81,495	92.13	+8.07	81,360	92.03	+5.57
Registered voters		88,455			88,408		
Source: Ministère de l’Europe et des Affaires étrangères (first round), (second round)

=== Wallis and Futuna's 1st constituency ===
Candidate	Party	First round		
Candidate	Party	Votes	%	+/–
Sylvain Brial	DVG	3,656	51.61	+5.42
Napole Polutele	UDI–REM	3,428	48.39	–1.85
Votes		7,084	100.00	–
Valid votes		7,084	99.45	+0.22
Blank votes		20	0.28	–0.17
Null votes		19	0.27	–0.05
Turnout		7,123	83.02	+1.75
Abstentions		1,457	16.98	–1.75
Registered voters		8,580		
Source: Préfecture de Wallis et Futuna

=== Réunion's 7th constituency ===
Candidate	Party	First round			Second round		
Candidate	Party	Votes	%	+/–	Votes	%	+/–
Jean-Luc Poudroux	DVD (supported by LR–UDI)	6,402	27.11	New	17,228	59.44	New
Pierrick Robert	MoDem	4,030	17.07	New	11,754	40.56	New
Aurélien Centon	SE	3,582	15.17	New			
Emmanuel Séraphin	DVG (supported by PS)	2,241	9.49	-1.36			
Jean-François Nativel	SE	1,677	7.10	+0.95			
Perceval Gaillard	FI	1,137	4.81	-7.06			
Gilles Leperlier	PCR	886	3.75	New			
Ulrich Quinot	SE	845	3.58	New			
Jean-Pierre Marchau	EELV	744	0.75	New			
Mathieu Hoarau	DVD	725	3.07	New			
Michelle Lartin-Graja	RN	617	2.61	-1.48			
Jonathan Rivière	LR dissident	570	2.41	-1.09			
Fabien Dijoux	UPR	158	0.67	-0.59			
Votes		23,614	100.00	–	28,982	100.00	–
Valid votes		23,614	21.28		28,982	26.12	
Blank votes		854	0.77		1,873	1.69	
Null votes		1,221	1.10		3,135	2.83	
Turnout		25,689	23.15		33,990	30.63	
Abstentions		85,279	76.85		76,977	69.37	
Registered voters		110,968			110,967		
Source: Ministère de l’Interieur

== 2020 by-elections ==
=== Seine-Maritime's 5th constituency ===
2020 by-election: Seine-Maritime's 5th constituency
Party	Candidate	Votes	%	±%
PS	Gérard Leseul	6,586	39.94	−1.92
RN	Jean-Cyril Montier	2,970	18.01	−0.81
LREM	Patricia Lhoir	1,767	10.72	N/A
LR	Michel Allais	1,601	9.71	−11.41
G.s	Auban Al Jiboury	1,455	8.82	N/A
LFI	Maxime Da Silva	1,434	8.70	−3.06
Far left	Valérie Foissey	391	2.37	N/A
Others	N/A	286		
Turnout		16,918	17.71	−31.37
2nd round result
PS	Gérard Leseul	11,502	71.61	+2.46
RN	Jean-Cyril Montier	4,561	28.39	N/A
Turnout		16,961	17.75	−24.29
PS hold				

=== Val-de-Marne's 9th constituency ===
2020 by-election: Val-de-Marne's 9th constituency
Party	Candidate	Votes	%	±%
PS	Isabelle Santiago	2,230	33.74	+13.20
EELV	Sandra Regol	1,147	17.35	N/A
LREM	Jonathan Rosenblum	661	10.00	−19.25
PCF	Fati Konate	639	9.67	+0.87
RN	Gaëtan Dussausaye	595	9.00	+0.46
LR	Michèle Bonhomme Afflatet	594	8.99	+1.15
LFI	Christian Benedetti	437	6.61	−9.08
Far left	Sandrine Ruchot	161	2.44	N/A
DVE	Abdallah Benbeika	146	2.21	N/A
Turnout		6,812	12.89	−29.8
2nd round result
PS	Isabelle Santiago	3,096	57.80	−0.94
EELV	Sandra Regol	2,260	42.20	N/A
Turnout		5,794	10.96	−26.85
PS hold				

== 2021 by-elections ==
=== Pas-de-Calais's 6th constituency ===
Pas-de-Calais's 6th constituency is vacant since 27 September 2020.

Name	Party
Laure Bourel	LO
Jerome Jossien	PCF
Jeremy Revillon	EELV
Bastien Marguerite-Garin	PS
Brigitte Bourguignon	LREM
Faustine Maliar	LR
Marie-Christine Bourgeois	RN

=== Paris's 15th constituency ===
MP for Paris's 15th constituency George Pau-Langevin resigned.

2021 by-election: Paris's 15th constituency
Party	Candidate	Votes	%	±%
PS	Lamia El Aaraje	3,010	25.82	+1.69
LFI	Danielle Simonnet	2,437	20.90	+2.24
LR	François-Marie Didier	2,171	18.62	+9.70
EELV	Antoinette Guhl	2,160	18.53	+7.66
PCF	Thomas Roger	1,239	10.63	+6.08
DVD	Jean-Damien de Sinzogan	449	3.85	N/A
Far-left	Sarah Gardent	130	1.12	N/A
DIV	Farid Ghehioueche	63	0.54	N/A
Turnout		12,029	15.55	−35.91
2nd round result
PS	Lamia El Aaraje	6,678	56.56	−3.73
LFI	Danielle Simonnet	5,128	43.44	+3.73
Turnout		12,665	16.36	−26.95
PS hold				

=== Indre-et-Loire's 3rd constituency ===
- Indre-et-Loire's 3rd constituency

=== Oise's 1st constituency ===
Olivier Dassault died suddenly in March 2021. He was succeeded by his nephew Victor Habert-Dassault.

=== Indre-et-Loire's 3rd constituency ===
Sophie Métadier was elected in Indre-et-Loire's 3rd constituency

== See also ==
- List of by-elections to the National Assembly (France)
