= Philippe Houillon =

French politician

Deputy for Val-d'Oise's 1st constituency in the National Assembly of France
- In office 2 April 1993 – 20 June 2017
- Preceded by: Jean-Philippe Lachenaud (UDF)
- Succeeded by: Isabelle Muller-Quoy (LREM)
- Parliamentary group: UDF(1993-1997) DL(1997-2002); UMP(2002-2015) LR(since 2015)

General Councillor, Canton of Pontoise
- In office 2 January 2001 – 18 March 2001
- Preceded by: Philippe Hémet (UDF)
- Succeeded by: Gérard Seimbille (DVD)

Mayor of Pontoise
- Incumbent
- Assumed office 19 March 2001
- Preceded by: Jean-Michel Rollot (PS)

President, Constitutional Acts, Legislation and General Administration Committee of the National Assembly of France
- In office 4 June 2005 – 18 June 2007
- Preceded by: Pascal Clément
- Succeeded by: Jean-Luc Warsmann

Personal details
- Born: December 15, 1951 (age 74) Bagnolet (Paris)

Philippe Houillon (born December 15, 1951) was a member of the National Assembly of France from 1993 to 2017. He represented the first constituency of the Val-d'Oise department. He is a member of The Republicans.

== Biography ==
After having studied in the institutions of Notre-Dame d'Enghien and Notre-Dame de Bury in Margency, he pursued law studies at Paris-Assas.

He was a Lawyer at age 21, then president of the Bar Association of the Val d'Oise, he is appointed judge of the Court of Justice of the Republic (from June 25, 1997).

He was a member of the Union for French Democracy group from 1993 to 1996, then, in 1997, changed to Liberal Democracy, joined the Union for a Popular Movement in 2002, then the Republicans in 2015.
