= Sophie Auconie =

French politician

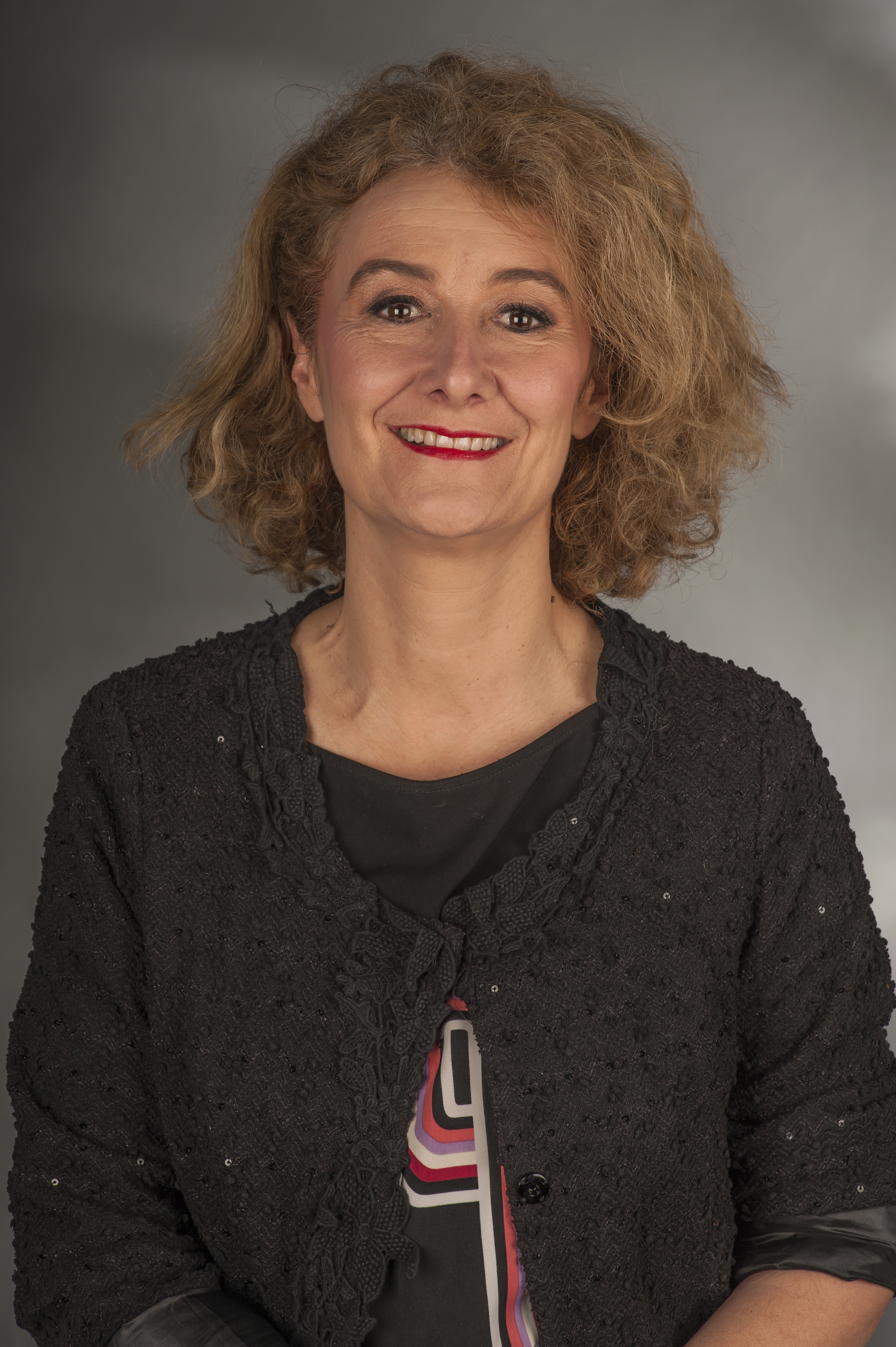

Member of the National Assembly for Indre-et-Loire's 3rd constituency
- In office 21 June 2017 – 5 March 2021
- Preceded by: Marisol Touraine
- Succeeded by: Sophie Métadier

Member of the European Parliament
- In office 7 June 2009 – 17 May 2017
- Constituency: Massif-central–Centre

Personal details
- Born: 19 August 1963 (age 63) Dugny, France
- Education: École supérieure de commerce et management (ESCEM)

Sophie Briard-Auconie (born 19 August 1963, in Dugny) is a French politician who has been serving as Member of the National Assembly since 2017, representing Indre-et-Loire's 3rd constituency as a member of the Union of Democrats and Independents. From 2009 until 2014, she served as a Member of the European Parliament, representing the Massif Central-Centre constituency.

A former member of Liberal Democracy (DL), Auconie joined the New Centre in 2008. Since 2008, she is a municipal councillor in Tours, Indre-et-Loire.

== Member of the European Parliament, 2009–2014 ==
In the 2009 European elections, Auconie was the third candidate on the list of the presidential majority (UMP/NC/LGM) in the Massif Central-Centre region, and was elected to the European Parliament. During her time in parliament, she served on the Committee on Regional Development (2009-2011) and on the Committee on the Environment, Public Health and Food Safety (2011-2014). She was also a member of the EU-Former Yugoslav Republic of Macedonia Joint Parliamentary Committee.

== Member of the National Assembly, 2021–present ==
In the 2017 French legislative election, Auconie won her seat after beating the sitting MP and former Minister of Social Affairs Marisol Touraine in the second round of voting. In parliament, she serves as member of the Committee on Sustainable Development.

In addition to her committee assignments, Auconie has been a member of the French delegation to the Parliamentary Assembly of the Council of Europe since 2017. In this capacity, she serves on the Assembly's Committee on Social Affairs, Health and Sustainable Development.

She resigned on March 5, 2021. She was replaced in a byelection by Sophie Métadier.

== Political positions ==
In 2020, Auconie criticized France's Citizens Convention for Climate “a rather questionable operation organized by President Emmanuel Macron, which suggests that there are no democratic institutions in France.”
