= Émilie Chandler =

French politician (born 1983)

Member of the National Assembly for Val-d'Oise's 1st constituency
- In office 21 June 2022 – 9 June 2024
- Preceded by: Antoine Savignat
- Succeeded by: Anne Sicard

Personal details
- Born: 29 April 1983 (age 42) Charleville-Mézières, Ardennes, France
- Party: Agir
- Other political affiliations: Ensemble

Émilie Chandler (French pronunciation: [emili ʃɑ̃dlɛʁ]; born 29 April 1983) is a French lawyer and politician. A member of Agir, she represented the 1st constituency of the Val-d'Oise department in the National Assembly from 2022 to 2024.

== Political career ==
In the 2022 legislative election, Chandler defeated outgoing deputy Antoine Savignat of The Republicans, who placed fourth in the first round. In the second round, she won 52.5% of the vote against Leïla Ivorra of La France Insoumise.

In Parliament, Chandler served on the Committee on Legal Affairs. In this capacity, she co-authored (together with Senator Dominique Vérien) a report in 2023 on domestic violence. From 2022 to 2024, Chandler was one of six National Assembly members who serve as judges of the Cour de Justice de la République (CJR).

In the 2024 snap election, she came third in both the first and second round, therefore losing her seat.

== See also ==
- List of deputies of the 16th National Assembly of France
