= Anne Sicard =

French politician (born 1967)

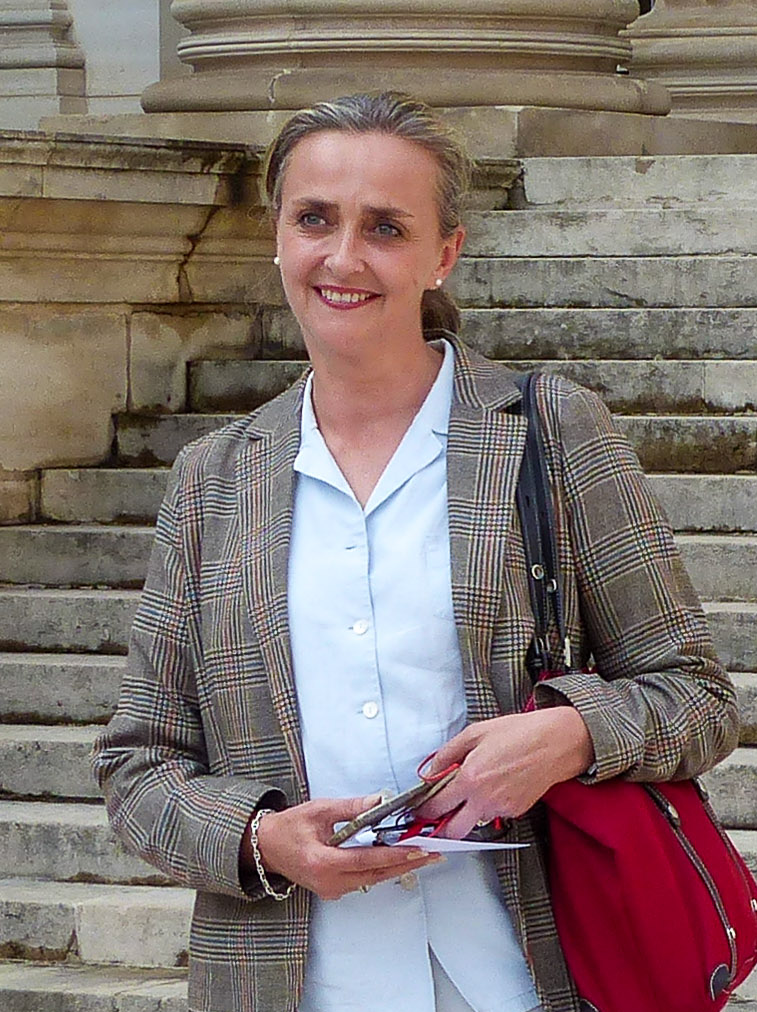

Member of the National Assembly for Val-d'Oise's 1st constituency
- Incumbent
- Assumed office 8 July 2024
- Preceded by: Émilie Chandler

Personal details
- Born: 15 June 1967 (age 58) Strasbourg, France
- Party: National Rally (since 2024)
- Other political affiliations: Reconquête (until 2024)

Anne Sicard (French pronunciation: [an sikaʁ]; born 15 June 1967) is a French politician of the National Rally (RN) who has represented the 1st constituency of Val-d'Oise in the National Assembly since 2024. A former member of Reconquête (REC), she was its candidate in Yvelines's 8th constituency in 2022, and served as deputy chief of staff to Marion Maréchal ahead of the 2024 European Parliament election. She was the head of financial endowments at Institut Iliade.

== Early life and career ==
Sicard was born to Algerian parents, and was a member of the Front national de la jeunesse as a teenager. She first ran for office in the 2022 legislative election.
