= Maliar (surname) =

Maliar is a Slovak and Ukrainian (Ukrainian: Маляр) surname. Slovak feminine: Maliarová

- Faustine Maliar (born 1995), French politician
- Ihor Maliar, Ukrainian pair skater
- Hanna Maliar, Former Ukrainian deputy minister of defense
