= Ludovic Loquet =

French politician

Member of Parliament for Pas-de-Calais's 6th constituency
- In office 7 August 2020 – 27 September 2020
- Preceded by: Brigitte Bourguignon
- Succeeded by: Brigitte Bourguignon

Personal details
- Party: La République En Marche!

Ludovic Loquet (born 4 February 1965) is a French politician who was the Member of Parliament for Pas-de-Calais's 6th constituency for a month in 2020.

== See also ==
- List of deputies of the 15th National Assembly of France
