= 2018 Val-d'Oise's 1st constituency by-election =

← 2017	28 January 2018 (first round); 4 February 2018 (second round)	2022 →
- Turnout: 20.33% ▼27.76% (first round); 19.09% ▼20.51% (second round)

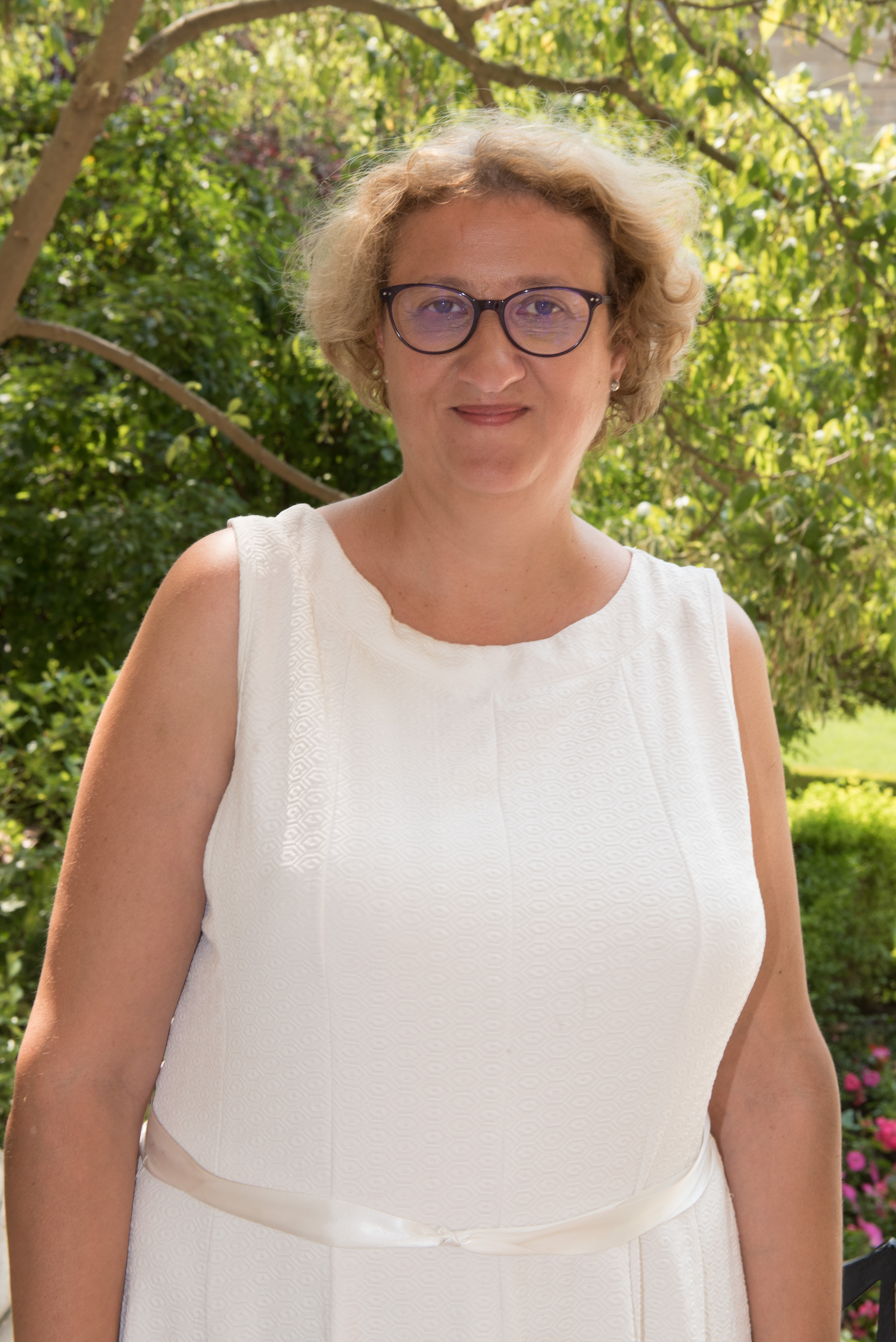

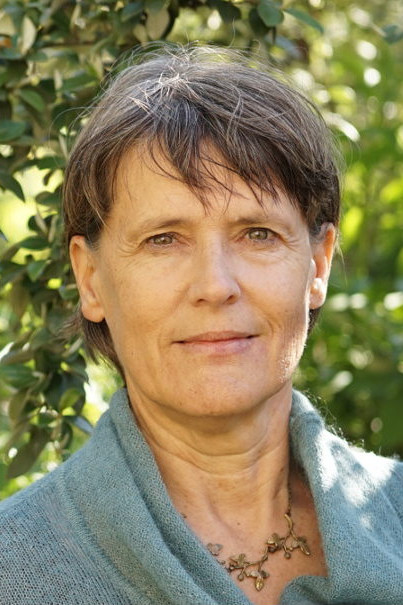
Nominee	Antoine Savignat	Isabelle Muller-Quoy	Leïla Saïb
Party	LR	LREM	LFI
1st round %	3,855; 23.67% ▲5.92%	4,768; 29.28% ▼6.65%	1,867; 11.47% ▲1.34%
2nd round %	7,167; 51.45% ▲5.69%	6,762; 48.55% ▼5.69%	Eliminated
Nominee	Stéphane Capdet	Sandra Nguyen-Derosier	Bénédicte Ariès
Party	FN	PS	EELV
1st round %	1,647; 10.11% ▼5.19%	1,121; 6.88% ▲1.40%	1,009; 6.20% ▲2.33%
2nd round %	Eliminated	Eliminated	Eliminated
Deputy before election
Isabelle Muller-Quoy
LREM
Elected deputy
Antoine Savignat
LR

The first round of a by-election was held in Val-d'Oise's 1st constituency on 28 January 2018, with a second round on 4 February because no candidate secured a majority of votes in the first round. The by-election was called due to the invalidation of the election of Isabelle Muller-Quoy, candidate of La République En Marche! (REM), in the June 2017 legislative elections by the Constitutional Council on 16 November 2017. It was the first legislative by-election held during the 15th National Assembly.

In the first round on 28 January, Isabelle Muller-Quoy of La République En Marche! and Antoine Savignat of The Republicans (LR) advanced to the second round, as they did in June 2017, with Muller-Quoy securing a considerably lower share of the vote amid low turnout. Savignat was elected in the second round with 51.45% of the vote, defeating Muller-Quoy.

== Background ==
On 14 November 2017, the Constitutional Council heard an appeal regarding the 2017 legislative elections within Val-d'Oise's 1st constituency by the three main defeated candidates, Antoine Savignat of The Republicans (LR), Denise Cornet of the National Front (FN), and Leïla Saïb of La France Insoumise (FI), who argued that the election should be invalidated because Michel Alexeef, selected as a substitute to elected deputy Isabelle Muller-Quoy of La République En Marche! (REM), previously served as a president of an employment tribunal within the constituency from January 2016 to January 2017, rendering him ineligible to run in a legislative election under the electoral code.

The Constitutional Council annulled the election of Muller-Quoy on 16 November 2017 under article L.O. 132 of the electoral code, and a by-election was held in the constituency in 2018 to fill the vacant seat. The legislative by-election was the first to be held since the election of Emmanuel Macron, and the first to be contested by a REM candidate.

Since the 2017 legislative elections, the Constitutional Council received 298 appeals within 122 constituencies; since 21 July, 242 of these were rejected, with another forty cases outstanding when the result in Val-d'Oise was annulled.

Though the poll opening and closing times were initially set as 8:00 and 18:00 CET, these hours were later extended to 20:00 CET.

== Candidates ==
On 14 December 2017, the by-election was scheduled for 28 January 2018, with a second round on 4 February should no candidate secure a majority of votes in the first round; candidates are required to file between 2 and 5 January. As of 17 December 2017, Isabelle Muller-Quoy declared her candidacy for La République En Marche!, Antoine Savignat for The Republicans, Stéphane Capdet for the National Front, Leïla Saïb for La France Insoumise, Sandra Nguyen-Derosier for the Socialist Party (PS), Bénédicte Ariès for Europe Ecology – The Greens (EELV), Hélène Halbin for Lutte Ouvrière (LO), and Denise Cornet for The Patriots (LP), having stood under the FN label in June. In addition, Huguette François of the Party of France (PDF), previously invested in June as part of a far-right electoral alliance, Debout la France (DLF) candidate Jean-Paul Nowak, Christophe Hayes of the Popular Republican Union (UPR), and Brigitte Poli of the French Communist Party (PCF) also filed to run.

== Campaign ==
On 9 January 2018, the Union of Democrats and Independents (UDI) announced its support for Savignat, whose substitute, Nathalie Groux, is an elected member of the UDI. Xavier Renou, substitute to Leïla Saïb, candidate of La France Insoumise, alleged that mayor of Beaumont-sur-Oise Nathalie Groux, substitute to Antoine Savignat of The Republicans, made it deliberately difficult to register as a candidate, a claim that Groux denied. On 13 January, Florian Philippot visited in support of Denise Cornet, followed by Christophe Castaner in support of Muller-Quoy on 14 January. Nicolas Bay visited on 19 January in support of Stéphane Capdet, and La France Insoumise deputies Alexis Corbière and Adrien Quatennens visited on 20 January to support the candidacy of Leïla Saïb, the same day that Valerie Pécresse came to support Antoine Savignat. Minister Agnès Buzyn visited to campaign with Muller-Quoy on 22 January, followed by Prime Minister Édouard Philippe on 25 January, the latter's visit considered an appeal to the traditionally right-wing tendencies of the constituency.

In the first round on 28 January, Muller-Quoy received 29.28% of the vote, compared to Savignat with 23.67% of the vote, a significantly smaller margin than that in June. Saïb arrived in third with 11.47% of the vote, followed by Capdet with 10.11%, Nguyen-Dérosier with 6.88%, and Ariès with 6.20%. On 30 January, Castaner came to Beaumont-sur-Oise to support Muller-Quoy, followed by Pécresse and Laurent Wauquiez on 31 January to back Savignat, not long after a tense meeting of the two at the national council of the party on 27 January, and were accompanied by deputy and LR vice president Damien Abad. On 1 February, Philippe and Castaner visited the constituency together at a public meeting in support of Muller-Quoy, who was introduced by deputy Aurélien Taché. In the second round on 4 February, Savignat was elected deputy with 51.45% of the vote, defeating Muller-Quoy, who received 48.55%.

== 2017 election result ==
First round results by commune

Second round results by commune

Candidate	Party	First round		Second round	
Candidate	Party	Votes	%	Votes	%
Isabelle Muller-Quoy	LREM	13,817	35.93	15,400	54.23
Antoine Savignat	LR	6,827	17.75	12,996	45.77
Denise Cornet	FN	5,886	15.31		
Leïla Saïb	LFI	3,895	10.13		
Sandra Nguyen-Derosier	PS	2,107	5.48		
Bénédicte Ariès	EELV	1,486	3.86		
Brigitte Poli	PCF	988	2.57		
Albert Lapeyre	LT-NE	839	2.18		
Michel Boisnault	577–LI	719	1.87		
Huguette François	UDP	491	1.28		
Lionel Mabille	UPR	374	0.97		
Thierry Sallantin	AEI	321	0.83		
Hélène Halbin	LO	304	0.79		
Brigitte Gilibert	SIEL	300	0.78		
Mistafa Fanouni	DIV	94	0.24		
Katia Lebaillif	PVB	2	0.01		
Élisabeth Gaucher	R&PS	2	0.01		
Rudy Bruyelle	DIV	0	0.00		
Anne-Sophie Vuillemin	PCD	0	0.00		
Votes		38,452	100.00	28,396	100.00
Valid votes		38,452	98.04	28,396	87.92
Blank votes		599	1.53	3,066	9.49
Null votes		168	0.43	837	2.59
Turnout		39,219	48.09	32,299	39.61
Abstentions		42,328	51.91	49,250	60.39
Registered voters		81,547		81,549	
Source: Ministry of the Interior, political parties

== 2018 by-election result ==
First round results by commune

Second round results by commune

Candidate	Party	First round			Second round		
Candidate	Party	Votes	%	+/–	Votes	%	+/–
Isabelle Muller-Quoy	LREM	4,768	29.28	–6.65	6,762	48.55	–5.69
Antoine Savignat	LR	3,855	23.67	+5.92	7,167	51.45	+5.69
Leïla Saïb	LFI	1,867	11.47	+1.34			
Stéphane Capdet	FN	1,647	10.11	–5.19			
Sandra Nguyen-Derosier	PS	1,121	6.88	+1.40			
Bénédicte Ariès	EELV	1,009	6.20	+2.33			
Jean-Paul Nowak	DLF	702	4.31	+4.31			
Huguette François	PDF	429	2.63	+1.36			
Brigitte Poli	PCF	320	1.97	–0.60			
Hélène Halbin	LO	204	1.25	+0.46			
Denise Cornet	LP	193	1.19	+1.19			
Christophe Hayes	UPR	169	1.04	+0.07			
Votes		16,284	100.00	–	13,929	100.00	–
Valid votes		16,284	97.24	–0.80	13,929	88.69	+0.77
Blank votes		332	2.04	+0.46	1,210	7.70	–1.79
Null votes		130	0.80	+0.35	567	3.61	+1.02
Turnout		16,746	20.33	–27.76	15,706	19.09	–20.51
Abstentions		65,607	79.67	+27.76	66,550	80.91	+20.51
Registered voters		82,353			82,256		
Source: Préfecture du Val d'Oise, Préfecture du Val d'Oise
