= Antoine Savignat =

French politician

Member of the National Assembly for Val-d'Oise's 1st constituency
- In office 5 February 2018 – 21 June 2022
- Preceded by: Isabelle Muller-Quoy
- Succeeded by: Emilie Chandler

Personal details
- Born: 22 July 1975 (age 50) Cormeilles-en-Parisis, Val-d'Oise, France
- Party: Republican

Antoine Savignat (born 22 July 1975) is a French politician of The Republicans (LR) who served as member of the French National Assembly after winning a by-election in 2018 for Val-d'Oise's 1st constituency.

== Political career ==
In parliament, Savignat served on the Committee on Legal Affairs. He was also a member of the Defence Committee from 2018 until 2019.

In 2021, Savignat and Jean-François Eliaou jointly wrote a parliamentary report on the situation of unaccompanied minors in France's criminal law.

He lost his seat in the first round of the 2022 French legislative election.

== Political positions ==
In July 2019, Savignat voted against the French ratification of the European Union's Comprehensive Economic and Trade Agreement (CETA) with Canada.
