= Christine Engrand =

French politician (born 1955)

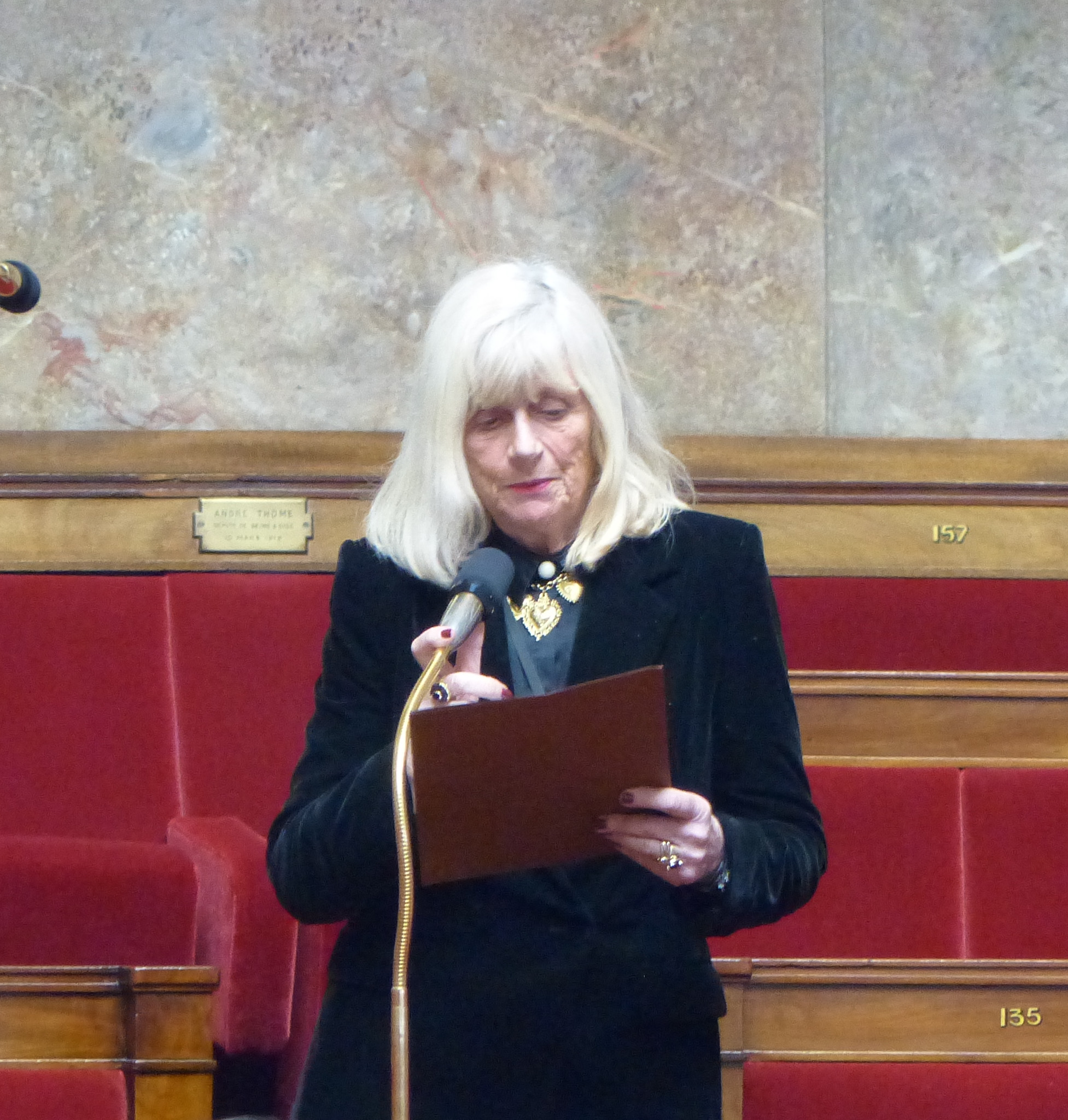
- Christine Engrand in 2026

Member of the National Assembly for Pas-de-Calais's 6th constituency
- Incumbent
- Assumed office 22 June 2022
- Preceded by: Christophe Leclercq, Brigitte Bourguignon

Personal details
- Born: 7 May 1955 (age 71) France
- Party: National Rally

Christine Engrand (born 7 May 1955) is a French politician from National Rally (RN) who has represented the Pas-de-Calais's 6th constituency of Pas-de-Calais in the National Assembly since 2022. She defeated Minister of Health Brigitte Bourguignon in the second round.

Engrand was re-elected in the first round of the 2024 French legislative election.

== See also ==
- List of deputies of the 16th National Assembly of France
- List of deputies of the 17th National Assembly of France
