= Lamia El Aaraje =

French-Moroccan politician (born 1986)

First Deputy Mayor of Paris
- Incumbent
- Assumed office 29 March 2026
- Mayor: Emmanuel Grégoire
- Preceded by: Patrick Bloche

Councillor of Paris
- Incumbent
- Assumed office 28 June 2014
- Mayor: Anne Hidalgo; Emmanuel Grégoire
- Constituency: 20th arrondissement

Deputy of the National Assembly for Paris's 15th constituency
- In office 6 June 2021 – 28 January 2022
- Preceded by: George Pau-Langevin
- Succeeded by: Danielle Simonnet

Personal details
- Born: 22 November 1986 (age 39) Rabat, Morocco
- Party: Socialist Party
- Education: University of Limoges; University of Versailles Saint-Quentin-en-Yvelines
- Profession: Pharmacist

Lamia El Aaraje (born 22 November 1986) is a Moroccan-born French politician who is the First Deputy Mayor of Paris. She has been a Paris Councillor since 2014.

She briefly represented the 15th constituency of Paris in the National Assembly from 2021 to 2022. She was elected, as a member of the Socialist Party (PS), in a 6 June 2021 by-election following the resignation of George Pau-Langevin. On 28 January 2022, the Constitutional Council nullified her election, ruling it was held irregularly. The seat remained vacant until the June 2022 legislative election, in which El Aaraje competed again, but was defeated by Danielle Simonnet of La France Insoumise (FI).

== Education and professional life ==
Born in Rabat, El Aaraje arrived in Limoges, France in 2004 to study pharmacy. She holds a doctorate in pharmacy; in October 2013 she defended a thèse d'exercice on the "Evolution of the concepts of public health and health education and the role of the School in their promotion".

At the same time, she completed her training by becoming a lawyer in health and drug law. Lamia El Aaraje began her professional career at the Haute Autorité de santé as an intern, before joining the parliamentary team of Haute-Garonne Socialist MP Catherine Lemorton, who presided over the Committee on Social Affairs in the 14th National Assembly. She subsequently worked as an executive in mutual health organisations (Mutuelle des Étudiants and Intériale Mutuelle).

== Political career ==
Joining the Socialist Party in the 2010s, Lamia El Aaraje became involved in various left-wing youth organisations during her university studies. Within the Young Socialist Movement, she participated in the local and national animation of a reformist sensibility. In particular, she spearheaded this sensitivity on many thematic health projects in preparation for the 2012 presidential election.

She has been a councillor for the 20th arrondissement on the Council of Paris, since April 2014. In the 2020 Paris municipal election, she was re-elected to the council, where she has presided over its 3rd commission (public space, security and transport) since July 2020.

In June 2021, following the resignation from Parliament of George Pau-Langevin who had become deputy to the Defender of Rights, El Aaraje won the by-election in the 15th constituency of Paris with 56.5% of the second-round vote against Danielle Simonnet of La France Insoumise. Her victory, in a constituency historically anchored on the left, marked the end of a campaign lasting several months due to the health crisis and the postponement of the election due to the COVID-19 pandemic.

In January 2022 however, the Constitutional Council nullified her election and declared the seat vacant. One of the candidates in the 2021 by-election had "fraudulently" shown the support of La République En Marche! for his candidacy on the ballot.

In the 2022 legislative election, El Aaraje declared she would run for a full term as the Socialist nominee in the 15th constituency, despite the New Ecological and Social People's Union (NUPES) coalition (of which the Socialist Party is part) deciding that La France Insoumise candidate Danielle Simonnet would be their joint candidate. While the NUPES described El Aaraje's candidacy as a "dissident" run, she was supported by former Socialist Prime Minister Lionel Jospin. She also benefited from the support of Paris Mayor Anne Hidalgo, whose policies she defends in the Council of Paris and whom she called to run for President of France in the 2022 presidential election. El Aaraje came a distant second place in the first round, before she faced Simonnet in the second round. She decisively lost the seat she had previously held.

In the 2026 Paris municipal election, where she played a central role in alliance building between socialists, communists and greens, she was re-elected as councillor, and selected as First Deputy Mayor of Paris.

== See also ==
- List of by-elections to the 15th National Assembly of France
