= La Clef (cinema) =

Independent and associative cinema in Paris

Coordinates: 48.84115°N 2.35245°E

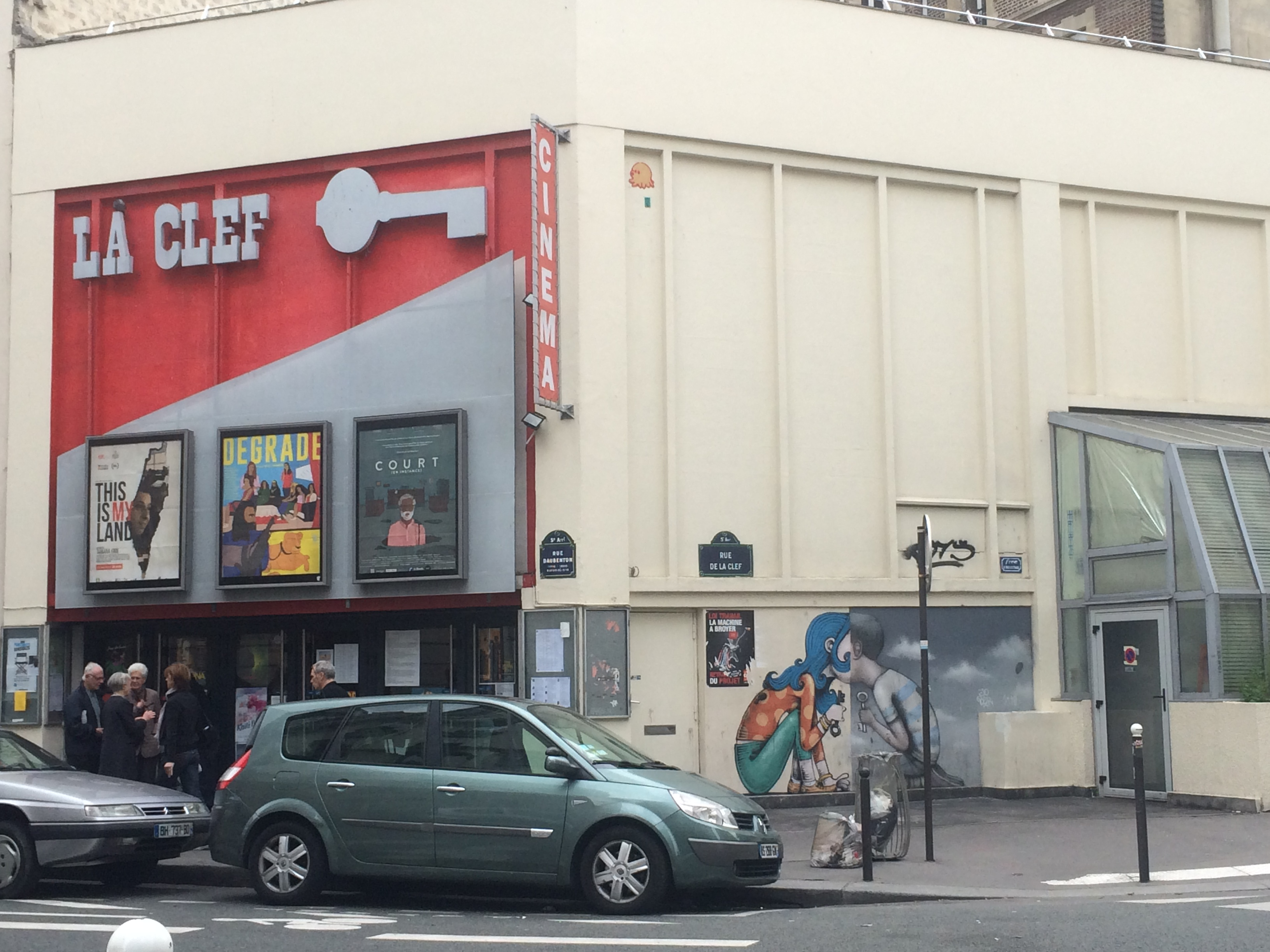
Cinéma la Clef in 2016

La Clef is an independent and non-profit associative cinema in Paris (21, rue de la Clef — 34, rue Daubenton), France.

== History ==
The cinema was founded in 1973 by Claude Frank-Forter, with the goal of promoting underrepresented filmmakers and of offering affordable prices. In 1981, after the cinema industry across France hit a recession, Frank-Forter sold the cinema to the Groupe Caisse d'Épargne. In 1990, filmmaker Sanvi Panou founded the Images d'Ailleurs project in the cinema, with the goal of presenting African and South America content.

The cinema-theater closed down in june 2009 and re-opened in September 2010 with a new associative structure and Raphaël Vion as director. It was renamed La Clef - L’Usage du monde, based on Nicolas Bouvier’s book “The Way of the World” and kept the goal of presenting world cinema.

In 2015, the Groupe Caisse d'Épargne announced that it would be selling the building in which the cinema was located. In 2018, the cinema was closed down.

== Public occupation ==
In 2019, a local radical group calling itself La Clef Revival Collective began an occupation of the building, intending to re-open the cinema and continue its operations under a democratic structure. On the first night of the occupation, the collective screened the film Attica, about the Attica Prison riot. Later in 2019, the cinema was the site of an action taken by striking workers from the Paris Opera Ballet, who put on a performance of Swan Lake.

Every evening, a screening is offered by the group of volunteers at open-price. Most of the time, in support for the cinema, the film director comes debating with the audience after the film, such as Françoise Romand, Yann Gonzalez, Guillaume Massart, Vincent Macaigne, Maud Alpi, Laurent Cantet, Claire Denis, Alain Cavalier and many more. The choice for programming remains to focus on lesser seen or self-produced films.

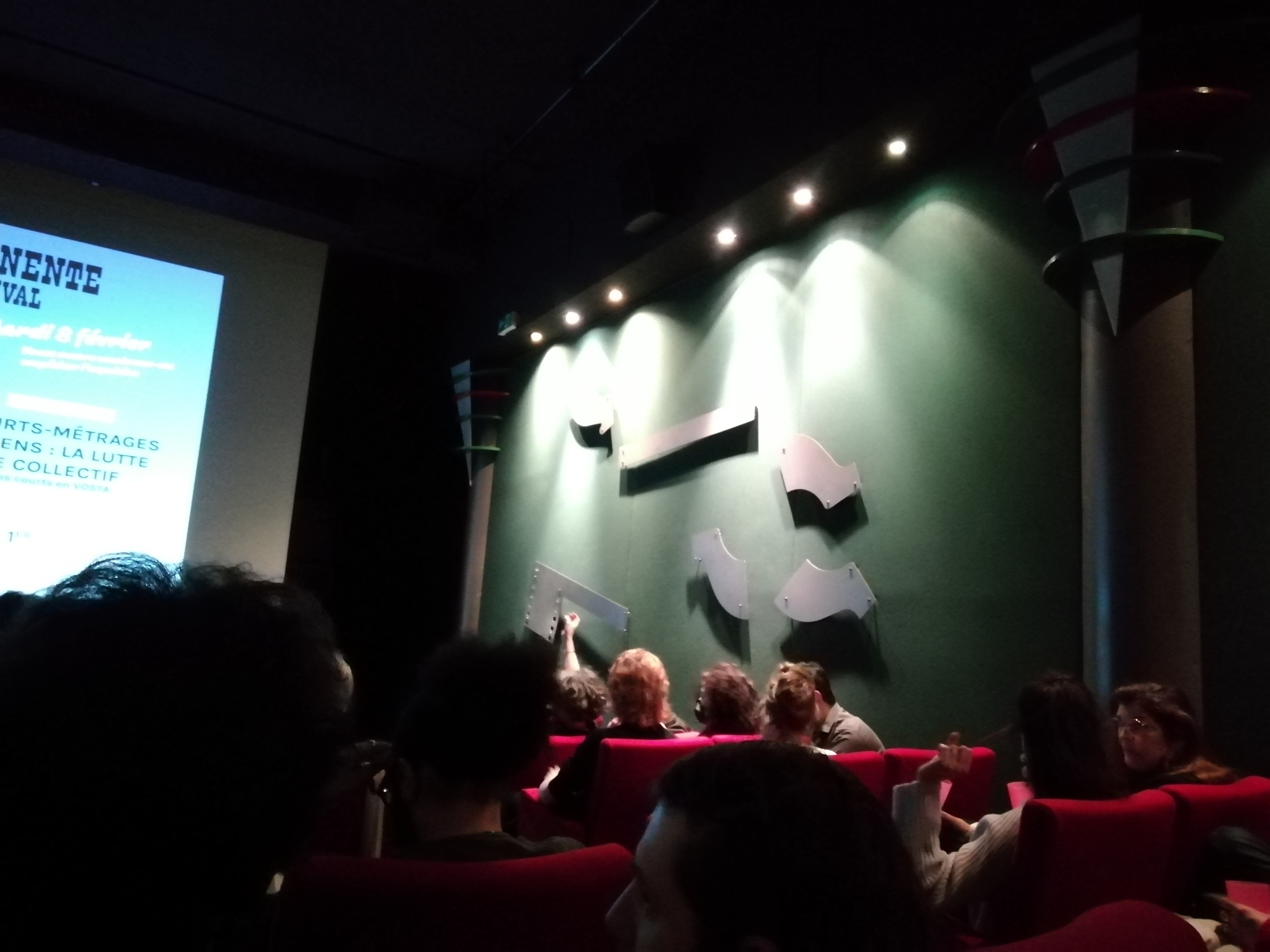
Screening at La Clef cinema, February 2022.

The collective also launched a programme titled Studio 34 to support young filmmakers in creating short films, the Tiny Escape: a regular workshop for local children, along with a fanzine, web radios in the building, exhibitions, theater and musical events.

During COVID-19 lockdown, the cinema-theater occupants began screening films on the outside wall on a regular basis, gaining press attention. They began to seek the purchase of the cinema themselves using crowdfunding with a dedicated endowment fund named Cinema Revival.

Despite public mobilization, threats on the cinema grow. A buyer (Groupe SOS) agreed with the owner on a €4.4M price for the building and the authorities ordered the closure on 31 January 2022 in order for the sale to be concluded. The collective occupying the cinema responded by staging a permanent film festival from 6am to 11pm every day during the following weeks. Along with a growing audience, many artists including John Carpenter, Céline Sciamma, Frederick Wiseman, Wang Bing, Leos Carax, Adèle Haenel and various activist groups came to support the occupants’ project.

On 1 March 2022, the Compagnies Républicaines de Sécurité raided the cinema and evicted the collective, ending the occupation after three years. However, the sale to Groupe SOS was not concluded. Later that month, municipal councillor Danielle Simonnet proposed a motion for the Council of Paris to buy the cinema and allow the collective to continue operations, however the motion was rejected by the city executives.

== Eviction of La Clef Revival Collective and building's purchase ==
Expelled from the building, the collective of volunteers continued its screenings in various friendly cultural places. Various artists spoke out in defense of the project, and alongside public mobilization, negotiations started with the building's owner. On 26 April 2023, a sales agreement was reached with La Clef Revival Collective. Martin Scorsese voiced support for the collective and its project. Fundraising activities included open-air screenings as well as an art exhibition and sale in Palais de Tokyo in November 2023. Artists in exhibition included David Lynch, Alain Guiraudie, Philippe Katerine, Orlan, Pierre Huyghe and Zineb Sedira.

On 19 June 2024, the building was sold to Cinema Revival for €2.7M and La Clef Revival opened the cinema for public screenings.

== Re-opening ==
After the building's purchase, the collective of volunteers started a renovation task, partly by professionnals, the other part led by the new owner and its supports. They then announced the re-opening for the 14th of january, 2026.
