= Henri Alfandari =

French politician (born 1979)

Member of the National Assembly for Indre-et-Loire's 3rd constituency
- Incumbent
- Assumed office 21 June 2022
- Preceded by: Sophie Métadier

Personal details
- Born: 2 October 1979 (age 46) Chambray-lès-Tours, Indre-et-Loire, France
- Party: Horizons

Henri Alfandari (born 2 October 1979) is a French politician from Horizons (Ensemble). He has been member of the National Assembly for Indre-et-Loire's 3rd constituency since 2022.

== Biography ==
Born in Chambray-lès-Tours, Henri Alfandari grew up in Saint-Cyr-sur-Loire. He studied at the Lycée Thérèse-Planiol in Loches (then called Alfred-de-Vigny). After beginning studies in economics and management, he turned to documentary filmmaking.

He then worked as communications director for the Saint-Gatien Group, a family business founded by his father, Dr. Jean-Pierre Alfandari, until February 2021.

== See also ==
- List of deputies of the 16th National Assembly of France
