= Christophe Leclercq =

French politician

Member of the National Assembly for Pas-de-Calais's 6th constituency
- In office 7 July 2021 – 21 June 2022
- Preceded by: Brigitte Bourguignon
- Succeeded by: Christine Engrand

Personal details
- Born: 24 February 1967 (age 59) Boulogne-sur-Mer, France
- Party: En Marche

Christophe Leclercq (born 24 February 1967) is a French politician from En Marche. He was elected Member of Parliament for Pas-de-Calais's 6th constituency in a by-election in 2021 to replace Brigitte Bourguignon.

== Biography ==
Christophe Leclercq is a surveyor and president of an association dedicated to helping children with disabilities.

He was a municipal councilor in Béthune, responsible for trade, from January 2016 to October 2019. In June 2021, he stood in for Brigitte Bourguignon in the partial legislative elections in the sixth constituency of Pas-de-Calais, called following the resignation of Brigitte Bourguignon's previous deputy after her appointment to the Castex government. As she wished to remain in government, he became a member of parliament on July 7, 2021. The following day, he joined the La République en Marche group in the National Assembly (France).

On July 23, 2021, he was the only LREM deputy to vote against the bill reinforcing respect for the principles of the Republic in its final reading.
