= Pas-de-Calais's 6th constituency =

Constituency of the National Assembly of France

6th constituency of the Pas-de-Calais
- inline Constituency of the National Assembly of France

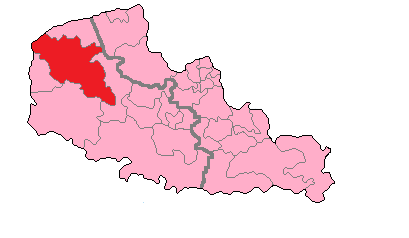
- Pas-de-Calais' 6th constituency shown within Nord-Pas-de-Calais
- Deputy: Christine Engrand; RN
- Department: Pas-de-Calais
- Cantons: Ardres, Desvres, Fauquembergues, Guînes, Heuchin, Lumbres, Marquise
- Registered voters: 89,021

The 6th constituency of the Pas-de-Calais is a French legislative constituency in the Pas-de-Calais département.

== Description ==
The borders of Pas-de-Calais' 6th Constituency were substantial altered as a result of the 2010 redistricting of French legislative constituencies leading to the constituency losing the northern portion of Boulogne-sur-Mer to Pas-de-Calais' 5th constituency.

The constituency is notable for being the seat of former Minister of Culture Jack Lang who held the seat for ten years between 2002 and 2012.

== Historic representation ==
Election	Member	Party
1986	Proportional representation - no election by constituency	
1988	Dominique Dupilet	PS
1993	Dominique Dupilet	PS
1997	Dominique Dupilet	PS
2002	Jack Lang	PS
2007	Jack Lang	PS
2012	Brigitte Bourguignon	PS
2017	Brigitte Bourguignon	LREM
2020	Ludovic Loquet	LREM
2021	Brigitte Bourguignon	LREM
2021	Christophe Leclercq	LREM
2022	Christine Engrand	RN
2024	Christine Engrand	RN

== Election results ==
=== 2024 ===
Candidate	Party	Alliance	First round			Second round		
Candidate	Party	Alliance	Votes	%	+/–	Votes	%	+/–
Christine Engrand	RN		32,553	50.70	+20.37			
Brigitte Bourguignon	RE	Ensemble	17,052	26.56	-5.54			
Aurore Pageaud	PS	NFP	9,065	14.12	-1.86			
Eric Houdayer	LR	UDC	4,495	7.00	2.85			
Laure Bourel	LO		703	1.09	+0.07			
Giovanni Anthony Frattini	DIV		335	0.52	new			
Votes			64,203	100.00				
Valid votes			64,203	97.26	+0.12			
Blank votes			1,163	1.76	-0.16			
Null votes			648	0.98	+0.04			
Turnout			66,014	69.75	+19.59			
Abstentions			28,629	30.25	-19.59			
Registered voters			94,643					
Result			RN HOLD					

=== 2022 ===
Legislative Election 2022: Pas-de-Calais's 6th constituency
Party	Candidate	Votes	%	±%
LREM (Ensemble)	Brigitte Bourguignon	14,667	32.10	-2.86
RN	Christine Engrand	13,857	30.33	+6.31
LFI (NUPÉS)	Pascal Lebecq	7,302	15.98	+3.07
LR (UDC)	Faustine Maliar	4,500	9.85	−9.35
REC	Jérôme Judek	1,484	3.25	N/A
PS	Patricia Duvieubourg*	1,438	3.15	N/A
Others	N/A	2,439	5.34	
Turnout		45,687	50.16	+25.90
2nd round result
RN	Christine Engrand	21,858	50.06	+12.11
LREM (Ensemble)	Brigitte Bourguignon	21,802	49.94	−12.11
Turnout		43,660	49.97	+25.98
RN gain from LREM				

* PS dissident

=== 2021 by-election ===
2021 by-election: Pas-de-Calais's 6th constituency
Party	Candidate	Votes	%	±%
LREM	Brigitte Bourguignon	7,458	34.96	
RN	Marie-Christine Bourgeois	5,125	24.02	
LR	Faustine Maliar	4,097	19.20	
PS	Bastien Marguerite-Garin	2,755	12.91	
DVG	Jérôme Jossien	1,237	5.80	
Far-left	Laure Bourel	663	3.11	
Turnout		22,440	24.26	
2nd round result
LREM	Brigitte Bourguignon	12,558	62.05	
RN	Marie-Christine Bourgeois	7,682	37.95	
Turnout		22,188	23.99	
LREM hold				

=== 2017 ===
Candidate	Label	First round		Second round	
Candidate	Label	Votes	%	Votes	%
Brigitte Bourguignon	REM	20,173	41.94	24,970	60.84
Marie-Christine Bourgeois	FN	10,914	22.69	16,074	39.16
Jean-Michel Taccoen	LR	7,672	15.95		
Nadine Demarey	FI	5,311	11.04		
Claudine Blauwart	DLF	1,109	2.31		
Charlotte Talpaert	ECO	1,095	2.28		
Patricia Duvieubourg	PCF	1,016	2.11		
Valérie Legrand	EXG	530	1.10		
Florence Denimal	DIV	281	0.58		
Votes		48,101	100.00	41,044	100.00
Valid votes		48,101	97.13	41,044	91.32
Blank votes		904	1.83	2,533	5.64
Null votes		519	1.05	1,367	3.04
Turnout		49,524	54.33	44,944	49.28
Abstentions		41,628	45.67	46,254	50.72
Registered voters		91,152		91,198	
Source: Ministry of the Interior

=== 2012 ===
Legislative Election 2012: Pas-de-Calais's 6th constituency
Party	Candidate	Votes	%	±%
PS	Brigitte Bourguignon	15,035	27.66	−11.87
UMP	Frédéric Wacheux	13,345	24.55	−8.62
DVG	Hervé Poher	11,301	20.79	N/A
FN	Olivier Delbe	10,125	18.63	+13.44
FG	Betty Charles	1,550	2.85	−1.63
Others	N/A	2,995		
Turnout		54,351	61.05	+1.42
2nd round result
PS	Brigitte Bourguignon	27,309	54.31	−0.41
UMP	Frédéric Wacheux	22,978	45.69	+0.41
Turnout		50,287	56.49	−4.68
PS hold				

=== 2007 ===
Legislative Election 2007: Pas-de-Calais's 6th constituency
Party	Candidate	Votes	%	±%
PS	Jack Lang	16,956	39.53	
UMP	Frédéric Wacheux	14,229	33.17	
FN	Jean-Jacques Vernalde	2,228	5.19	
PCF	Gisèle Cocquerelle	1,923	4.48	
MoDem	Hervé Morcrette	1,739	4.05	
CPNT	Rémi Harle	1,105	2.58	
Far left	Christian Ternisien	1,038	2.42	
LV	Vincent Becu	965	2.25	
MPF	Christophe Beaudouin	877	2.04	
Others	N/A	1,834		
Turnout		43,942	59.63	
2nd round result
PS	Jack Lang	23,839	54.72	
UMP	Frédéric Wacheux	19,729	45.28	
Turnout		45,076	61.17	
PS hold				

=== 2002 ===
Legislative Election 2002: Pas-de-Calais's 6th constituency
Party	Candidate	Votes	%	±%
PS	Jack Lang	16,305	39.03	
UMP	Bernard Deram	12,758	30.54	
FN	Michel Somville	4,294	10.28	
PCF	Fiselle Cocquerelle	1,895	4.54	
CPNT	Remi Harle	1,689	4.04	
Others	N/A	4,832		
Turnout		42,947	60.85	
2nd round result
PS	Jack Lang	22,204	53.83	
UMP	Bernard Deram	19,045	46.17	
Turnout		42,983	60.90	
PS hold				

=== 1997 ===
Legislative Election 1997: Pas-de-Calais's 6th constituency
Party	Candidate	Votes	%	±%
PS	Dominique Dupilet	15,520	35.62	
RPR	Bernard Deram	10,374	23.81	
FN	Jacques Fourny	5,327	12.23	
PCF	Gisèle Cocquerelle	4,544	10.43	
DVG	François Dubout	2,416	5.55	
LV	Max Papyle	2,338	5.37	
LO	Philippe Pichon	1,822	4.18	
DVD	Jeannine Chauffour-Royer	1,225	2.81	
Turnout		45,799	67.21	
2nd round result
PS	Dominique Dupilet	26,959	60.15	
RPR	Bernard Deram	17,863	39.85	
Turnout		48,080	70.56	
PS hold				

== Sources ==
- Official results of French elections from 1998: "Résultats électoraux officiels en France" (in French).
