= Brigitte Bourguignon =

French politician (born 1959)

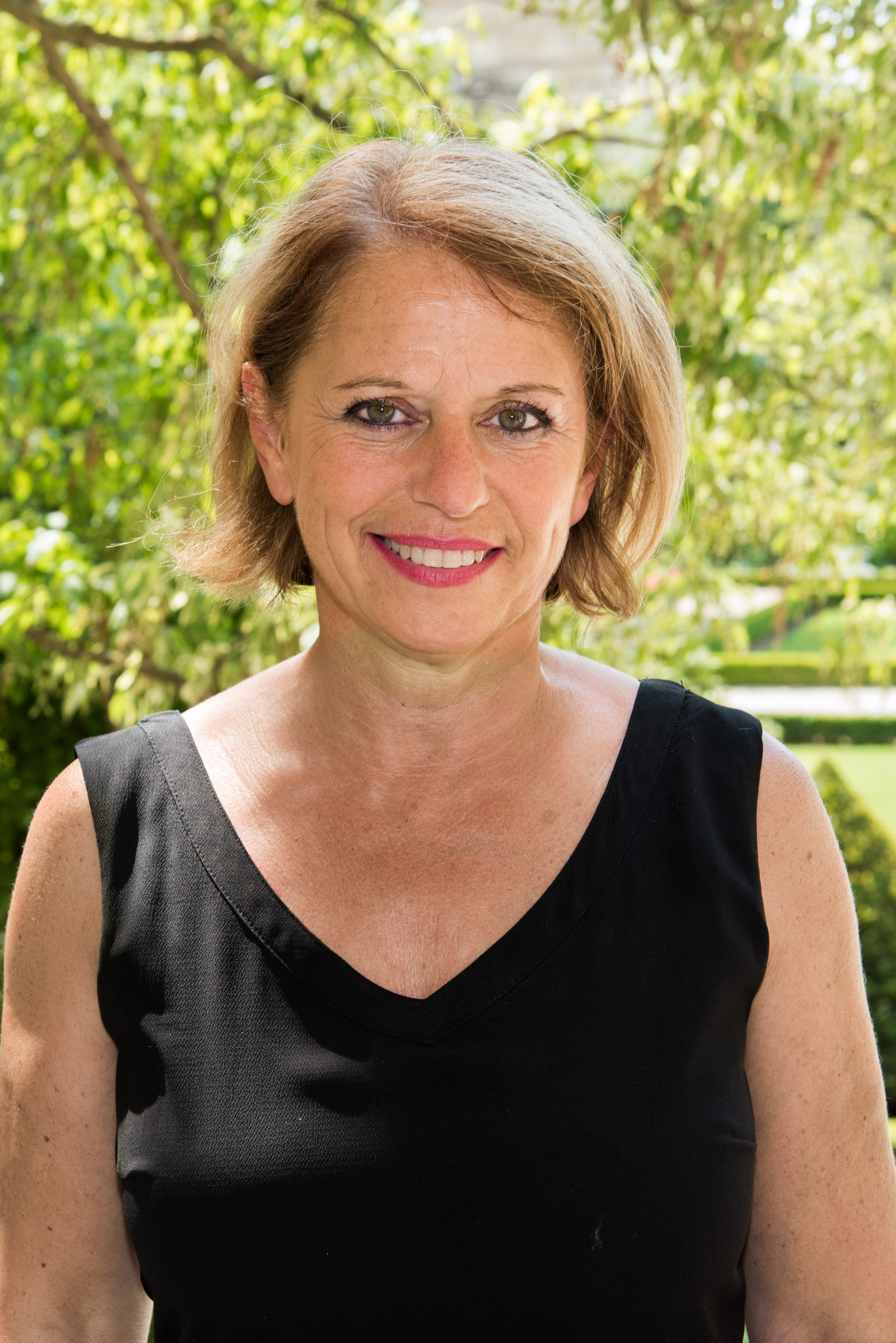
- Bourguignon in 2017

Minister of Health
- In office 20 May 2022 – 4 July 2022
- Prime Minister: Élisabeth Borne
- Preceded by: Olivier Véran
- Succeeded by: François Braun

Minister Delegate for Personal Independence
- In office 6 July 2020 – 20 May 2022
- Prime Minister: Jean Castex
- Preceded by: Position established

Member of the National Assembly for Pas-de-Calais's 6th constituency
- In office 20 June 2012 – 6 August 2020
- Preceded by: Jack Lang
- Succeeded by: Ludovic Loquet
- In office 7 June 2021 – 6 July 2021
- Preceded by: Ludovic Loquet
- Succeeded by: Christophe Leclercq

Personal details
- Born: 21 March 1959 (age 67) Boulogne-sur-Mer, France
- Party: Socialist Party (until 2017); La République En Marche! (since 2017)

Brigitte Bourguignon (born 21 March 1959) is a French politician who briefly served as Minister of Solidarity and Health in the government of Prime Minister Élisabeth Borne in 2022.

A member of the Socialist Party (PS) before she joined La République En Marche! (LREM) in 2017, Bourguignon served as the member of the National Assembly for the sixth constituency of Pas-de-Calais from (2012–2020) and as Minister for Autonomy in the government of Prime Minister Jean Castex (2020–2022). She lost her seat in the 2nd round of the 2022 election to Christine Engrand from the National Rally.

== Political career ==
Following the 2017 legislative election, Bourguignon stood as a candidate for the National Assembly's presidency; in an internal vote within the LREM parliamentary group, she lost against François de Rugy.

In parliament, Bourguignon chaired the Committee on Social Affairs from 2017 until 2020. In September 2018, following the election of Richard Ferrand as President of the National Assembly, she stood as a candidate to succeed him as chairman of the LREM parliamentary group. She was eliminated in the first ballot, coming in 5th position out of 7 candidates with 19 votes.

At the end of 2017, about thirty LREM members formed around Bourguignon who claimed to be the parliamentary group's "social fibre" and were seen as its left wing; by the end of 2018, Sonia Krimi took the group's lead from Bourguignon.

In what was the first victory of LREM in a legislative by-election, Bourguignon managed to win with 62.05% of the vote (60.8% in the previous election) over the National Rally (RN) candidate Marie-Christine Bourgeois in 2021. She briefly returned to parliament in 2021, before being replaced by Christophe Leclercq.

During her time at the Ministry of Solidarity and Health, Bourguignon led the government’s efforts in 2022 to file a criminal complaint against home care group Orpea over allegations of mistreatment of elderly patients in the period from 2017 to 2020.

== Political positions ==
In May 2018, Bourguignon co-sponsored an initiative in favour of a bioethics law extending to homosexual and single women free access to artificial reproduction such as in vitro fertilisation (IVF) under France's national health insurance; it was one of the campaign promises of President Emmanuel Macron and marked the first major social reform of his five-year term.

In July 2019, Bourguignon voted in favor of the French ratification of the European Union’s Comprehensive Economic and Trade Agreement (CETA) with Canada.

== See also ==
- 2017 French legislative election
