= Indre-et-Loire's 3rd constituency =

Constituency of the National Assembly of France

3rd constituency of Indre-et-Loire
- inline Constituency of the National Assembly of France

- Constituency in Department

- Location of Indre-et-Loire in France
- Deputy: Henri Alfandari; Horizons
- Department: Indre-et-Loire

The 3rd constituency of Indre-et-Loire is a French legislative constituency in Indre-et-Loire.

== Historic representation ==
Election	Member	Party
1988	Christiane Mora	PS
1993	Jean-Jacques Descamps	UDF-PR
1997	Marisol Touraine	PS
2002	Jean-Jacques Descamps	UDF-PR
2007	Marisol Touraine	PS
2012	Marisol Touraine	PS
2017	Sophie Auconie	UDI
2021	Sophie Métadier	UDI
2022	Henri Alfandari	Horizons
2024	Henri Alfandari	Horizons

== Election results ==
=== 2024 ===
Candidate	Party	Alliance	First round			Second round		
Candidate	Party	Alliance	Votes	%	+/–	Votes	%	+/–
Henri Alfandari	HOR	Ensemble	22,174	32.87	+7.61	41,028	62.24	+5.08
Jules Robin	LR-RN	UXD	21,724	32.21	new	24,896	37.76	new
Sandra Barbier	LFI	NFP	17,240	25.56	+1.41	withdrew		
Emmanuel François	DVD		3,248	4.82	new			
Christophe Legendre	LO		1,060	1.57	+0.43			
Amin Brimou	DVC		1,004	1.49	new			
Xavier Bourin	REC		1,003	1.49	-1.28			
Votes			67,453	100.00		65,924	100.00	
Valid votes			67,453	96.62	-1.11	65,924	94.70	+3.17
Blank votes			1,633	2.34	+0.68	2,767	3.98	-1.90
Null votes			729	1.04	+0.44	919	1.32	-1.27
Turnout			69,815	70.23	+18.55	69,610	70.01	+20.42
Abstentions			29,596	29.77	-18.55	29,825	29.99	-20.42
Registered voters			99,411			99,435		
Result			HOR HOLD					

=== 2022 ===
Legislative Election 2022: Indre-et-Loire's 3rd constituency
Party	Candidate	Votes	%	±%
HOR (Ensemble)	Henri Alfandari	12,686	25.26	N/A
LFI (NUPÉS)	Roxane Sirven	12,127	24.15	-12.19
UDI (UDC)	Sophie Métadier	10,448	20.81	−24.21
RN	Irène Protin	9,836	19.59	+0.95
DVE	Maria Loire	1,810	3.60	N/A
REC	Sylvie Patte	1,392	2.77	N/A
Others	N/A	1,914	-	−
Turnout		50,213	51.68	+33.42
2nd round result
HOR (Ensemble)	Henri Alfandari	25,792	57.16	N/A
LFI (NUPÉS)	Roxane Sirven	19,327	42.84	+5.77
Turnout		45,119	49.59	+31.33
HOR gain from UDI				

=== 2021 by-election ===
2021 by-election: Indre-et-Loire's 3rd constituency
Party	Candidate	Votes	%	±%
UDI	Sophie Metadier	7,744	45.02	
PS	Murielle Riolet	3,462	20.12	
RN	Jean-Guy Protin	3,207	18.64	
EELV	Zélie Geneix	2,790	16.22	
Turnout		17,866	18.26	
2nd round result
UDI	Sophie Metadier	10,503	62.93	
PS	Murielle Riolet	6,188	37.07	
Turnout		17,863	18.26	
UDI hold				

=== 2017 ===
Candidate	Label	First round		Second round	
Candidate	Label	Votes	%	Votes	%
Marisol Touraine	PS	13,792	28.54	17,022	43.41
Sophie Auconie	UDI	9,675	20.02	22,194	56.59
Sylvie Adolphe	FI	6,621	13.70		
Marc Angenault	DVD	5,224	10.81		
Éva Kukulski	FN	3,680	7.62		
Marie-Agnès Peltier	ECO	3,191	6.60		
François-Xavier Decrop	DLF	1,933	4.00		
Ronan Lebert	PCF	1,595	3.30		
Marie-Pierre Hage	ECO	884	1.83		
Claire Delore	EXG	610	1.26		
Thomas Jouhannaud	EXG	455	0.94		
Philippe Rubel	DIV	449	0.93		
Robert de Prévoisin	DVD	212	0.44		
Votes		48,321	100.00	39,216	100.00
Valid votes		48,321	96.41	39,216	88.16
Blank votes		1,275	2.54	3,830	8.61
Null votes		523	1.04	1,436	3.23
Turnout		50,119	51.41	44,482	45.63
Abstentions		47,371	48.59	53,006	54.37
Registered voters		97,490		97,488	
Source: Ministry of the Interior

=== 2012 ===
2012 legislative election in Indre-et-Loire's 6th constituency
Candidate	Party	First round		Second round	
Candidate	Party	Votes	%	Votes	%
Marisol Touraine	PS	25,830	44.76	33,147	60.21
Jacques Barbier	UMP	13,632	23.62	21,905	39.79
Catherine Costa	FN	6,825	11.83		
Gérard Hénault	NC-AC	4,477	7.76		
Sonia Bove	FG (PCF)	3,064	5.31		
Mathilde Gralepois	EELV	1,208	2.09		
Pascale Tremblay	MoDem	945	1.64		
Marie-Pierre Hage	AEI	383	0.66		
Damien Clauzel	DLR	338	0.59		
Caroline Desbois	UPF	281	0.49		
Patrick Bourbon	NPA	257	0.45		
Thomas Jouhannaud	LO	182	0.32		
Claire Delore	POI	166	0.29		
Robert de Prévoisin	AR	119	0.21		
Votes		58,554	61.96		
Spoilt and null votes		847	1.45		
Abstentions		35,956	38.04		
Registered voters		94,510	100.00	94,510	100.00

=== 2007 ===
Legislative Election 2007: Indre-et-Loire's 3rd constituency
Party	Candidate	Votes	%	±%
UMP	Jean-Jacques Descamps	24,769	42.49	+5.70
PS	Marisol Touraine	17,526	30.06	−3.41
PCF	Marie-France Beaufils	4,362	7.48	+4.07
MoDem	Elisabeth Lemaure	3,646	6.25	N/A
FN	Jean Verdon	2,360	4.05	−4.64
LV	Caroline Deforge	1,590	2.73	−0.25
Others	N/A	4,043	-	−
Turnout		59,358	64.18	−3.44
Registered electors		92,487		
2nd round result
PS	Marisol Touraine	28,714	50.22	+1.90
UMP	Jean-Jacques Descamps	28,463	49.78	−1.90
Turnout		58,954	63.74	−1.25
Registered electors		92,488		
PS gain from UMP				

=== 2002 ===
Legislative Election 2002: Indre-et-Loire's 3rd constituency
Party	Candidate	Votes	%	±%
UMP	Jean-Jacques Descamps	21,408	36.79	N/A
PS	Marisol Touraine	19,476	33.47	+4.24
FN	Elisabeth Touzot	5,055	8.69	−2.99
DVD	Michel Turco	3,893	6.69	N/A
PCF	Michèle Launay	1,984	3.41	−8.41
LV	Bernadette Moulin	1,732	2.98	N/A
Others	N/A	4,640	-	−
Turnout		59,405	67.62	−2.52
Registered electors		87,822		
2nd round result
UMP	Jean-Jacques Descamps	28,586	51.68	N/A
PS	Marisol Touraine	26,724	48.32	−5.17
Turnout		57,111	64.99	−9.57
Registered electors		87,871		
UMP gain from PS				

=== 1997 ===
Legislative Election 1997: Indre-et-Loire's 3rd constituency
Party	Candidate	Votes	%	±%
PPDF (UDF)	Jean-Jacques Descamps	17,450	31.43	
PS	Marisol Touraine	16,226	29.23	
PCF	Marie-France Beaufils	6,560	11.82	
FN	Olivier Chalmel	6,485	11.68	
LDI	Gérard Kérisit	2,308	4.16	
GE	Mickael Klun	1,781	3.21	
LO	Michel Deguet	1,701	3.06	
DVE	Joel Thalineau	1,374	2.47	
MDC	Jean-Louis Pierre	1,061	1.91	
PT	Serge Kuchmann	570	1.03	
Turnout		59,051	70.14	
Registered electors		84,251		
2nd round result
PS	Marisol Touraine	31,835	53.49	
PPDF (UDF)	Jean-Jacques Descamps	27,686	46.51	
Turnout		62,780	74.56	
Registered electors		84,204		
PS gain from PPDF				
