= Marisol Touraine =

French politician (born 1959)

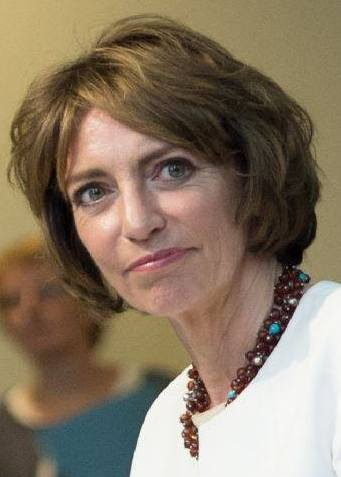

Minister of Social Affairs
- In office 16 May 2012 – 10 May 2017
- Prime Minister: Jean-Marc Ayrault; Manuel Valls; Bernard Cazeneuve
- Preceded by: Roselyne Bachelot
- Succeeded by: Agnès Buzyn (Solidarity and Health)

Minister of Health
- In office 16 May 2012 – 10 May 2017
- Prime Minister: Jean-Marc Ayrault; Manuel Valls; Bernard Cazeneuve
- Preceded by: Xavier Bertrand
- Succeeded by: Agnès Buzyn (Solidarity and Health)

Personal details
- Born: 7 March 1959 (age 67) Paris, France
- Party: Socialist Party
- Education: Sciences Po; École Normale Supérieure

Marisol Touraine (French: [maʁisɔl tuʁɛn]; born 7 March 1959) is a French politician who served as Minister of Social Affairs and Health under Prime Ministers Jean-Marc Ayrault, Manuel Valls, and Bernard Cazeneuve.

== Early life and education ==
Touraine was born on 7 March 1959 in Paris. She graduated from the Paris Institute of Political Studies (Sciences Po). She studied at the École Normale Supérieure, where she specialised in economic and social issues. She also attended Harvard University but did not receive a degree. She is fluent in Spanish.

== Political career ==
From 1988 to 1991, Touraine was an advisor to Prime Minister Michel Rocard on geostrategic issues.

Touraine served as a member of the National Assembly of France for Indre-et-Loire (3rd constituency) from 1997 to 2002 for the Socialiste, radical, citoyen et divers gauche political party. She was defeated in the second round of the 2002 elections by Jean-Jacques Descamps (UMP). She regained the district in the 2007 elections with a small majority (50.22%), and served until 2012.

On the regional level, Touraine has been general councillor for Indre-et-Loire since the 2001 elections. She served as Vice-President of the General Council of Indre-et-Loire from 2008 to 2011, and as its President from 2011 to 2012, when she resigned. She has served as General councillor of Indre-et-Loire since 1998, having been re-elected in 2004 and in 2011.

In the French presidential election, Touraine endorsed Dominique Strauss-Kahn before later supporting Hollande.

=== Minister of Health and Social Affairs ===
On 16 May 2012, Touraine was named by Prime Minister Jean-Marc Ayrault as Minister of Health and Social Affairs. The designation was accepted by President of France François Hollande, in line with tradition. In her ministerial post, she worked to improve HIV/AIDS prevention and early diagnosis, promoted universal hepatitis C treatment with innovative drugs, implemented plain tobacco packaging and launched a nutrition labelling system.

In October 2012, Touraine announced that trial centres could open in 2012 in France for drug addicts to safely inject their own drugs. This measure met with criticism coming from both the opposition and members of the majority. She entered into negotiations with doctors and health insurance professional organisations to limit the prices of medical assistance.

During her time in office, Touraine oversaw a 2013 pension reform which gradually extended the mandatory pay-in period from 41.5 years to 43 by 2035 and required workers, retirees and employers to fill in an annual deficit set otherwise to reach 20 billion euros ($26 billion) in 2020. She also worked on implementing a 2015 reform aimed at making it easier for low-earners to get access to a doctor.

Also during her term, Touraine steered France’s response to both a MERS outbreak in 2013 and the Western African Ebola virus epidemic from 2013, during which several French nationals contracted the virus. After a review of the measure from 2012 until 2015, she opted to lift blood donation restrictions on men who have sex with men that had been in place since 1983.

By the end of her term, Touraine was widely expected to join her party’s presidential primaries in 2017; she eventually decided not to run for president. When Prime Minister Valls declared that he would seek the Socialist Party’s nomination and quit the government to focus on campaigning, Touraine was seen by news media as possible choice to replace him and lead what would effectively become a caretaker government; instead, the post went to Bernard Cazeneuve. In the ensuing cabinet reshuffle to form the Cazeneuve government, she lost the responsibility for women’s rights to newly appointed minister Laurence Rossignol.

== Life after politics ==
In 2019, Touraine was elected chair of the Executive Board of Unitaid.

== Other activities ==
In 2009, Touraine belonged to the "Future of Health Club" (Club Avenir de la santé), a lobby group funded by GlaxoSmithKline, the world's No. 7 of pharmaceutical products, producing amongst other things, nicotine patches.

== Political positions ==
In 2016, Touraine was one of two ministers who came out in open disagreement with the government’s stance on a ban of burkinis. She argued that "to pretend that swimming veiled or bathing on a beach dressed is in itself threatening to public order and the values of the Republic is to forget that those (secular) values are meant to allow each person to safeguard their identity."

== Personal life ==
Touraine is the daughter of French sociologist Alain Touraine and Chilean academic Adriana Arenas Pizarro (d. 1990). She has a brother, Philippe, who is professor of endocrinology. She is also first cousin of Alberto Arenas, Chile's Budget Director during Michelle Bachelet's presidency.

Touraine is married to diplomat Michel Reveyrand de Menthon, who is currently French ambassador to Chad. She is a mother of three. When President Hollande published a list of bank deposits and property held by all 38 ministers for first time 2012, Touraine declared personal assets worth 1.4 million euros, mainly property.

In September 2013, Touraine's elder son was sentenced to three years' imprisonment for extortion and sequestration.
