= Antoinette Guhl =

French politician (born 1970)

Member of the Senate
- Incumbent
- Assumed office 2 October 2023
- Constituency: Paris

Personal details
- Born: 10 June 1970 (age 56)
- Party: The Ecologists

Antoinette Guhl (born 10 June 1970) is a French politician of The Ecologists. Since 2023, she has been a member of the Senate. She has been a member of the Council of Paris since 2014, and served as a deputy mayor, from 2014 to 2020. She was a candidate for Paris's 15th constituency in the 2017 legislative election and the 2021 by-election.
