= Danielle Simonnet =

French politician (born 1971)

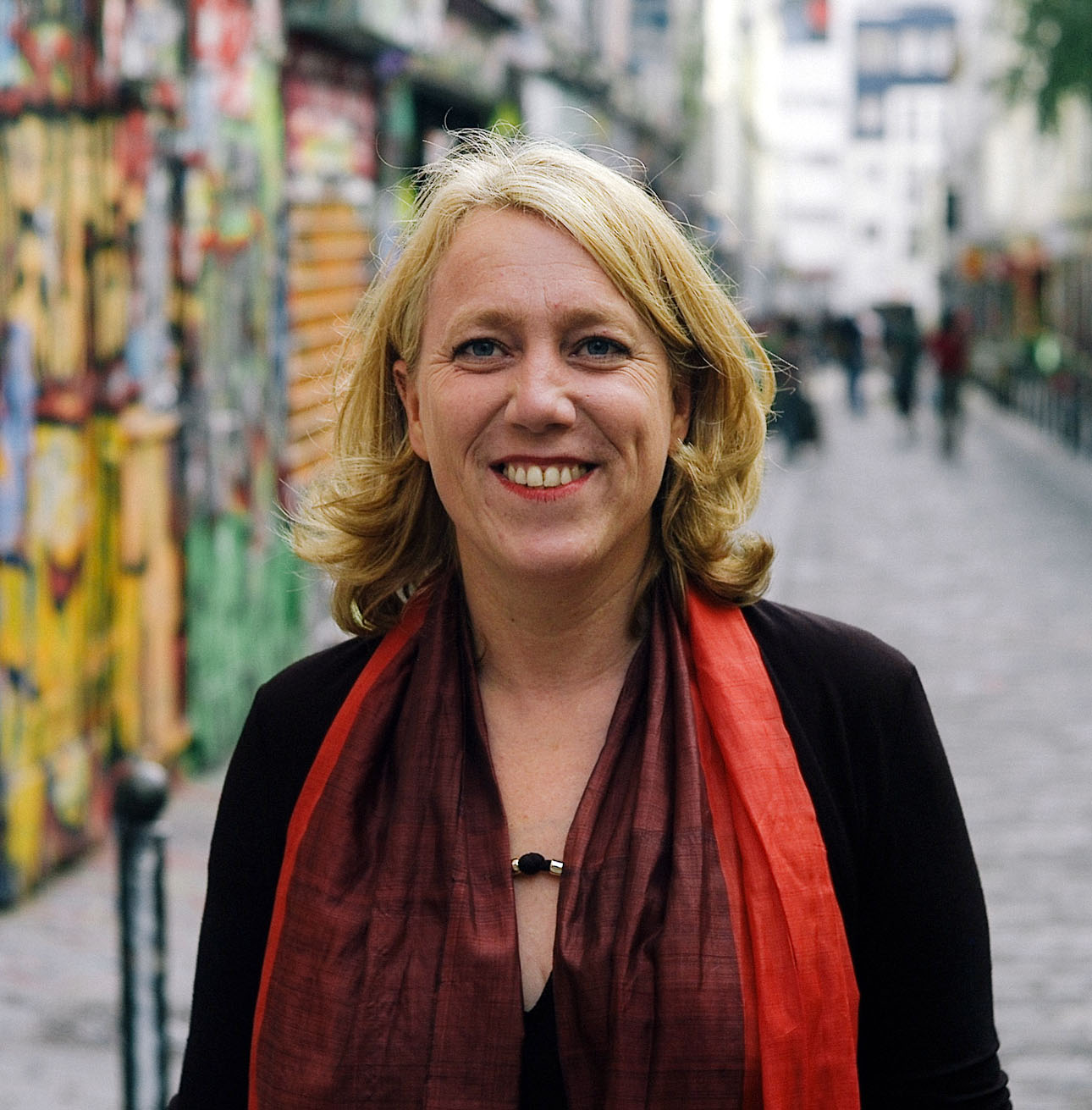
- Danielle Simonnet in 2013

Member of the National Assembly for Paris's 15th constituency
- Incumbent
- Assumed office 22 June 2022
- Preceded by: Lamia El Aaraje

Councillor of Paris
- Incumbent
- Assumed office 21 March 2008
- Mayor: Bertrand Delanoë; Anne Hidalgo

National orator of La France Insoumise
- Incumbent
- Assumed office 10 February 2016
- Leader: Jean-Luc Mélenchon

Personal details
- Born: 2 July 1971 (age 55) Montereau-Fault-Yonne, France
- Party: L'Après (since 2024)
- Other political affiliations: Socialist Party (1989–2008); Left Party (2008–present); La France Insoumise (2016–2024)
- Education: Paris Nanterre University
- Profession: Psychologist

Danielle Simonnet (French pronunciation: [danjɛl simɔnɛ]; born 2 July 1971) is a French politician. She was elected Member of Parliament for Paris's 15th constituency in the 2022 legislative election.

== Political career ==
In March 2022, she proposed a motion for the Council of Paris to buy the La Clef cinema and allow the collective to continue operations, however the motion was rejected by the city executives.

== See also ==
- List of deputies of the 16th National Assembly of France
