= Paris's 15th constituency =

Constituency of the National Assembly of France

15th constituency of Paris
- inline Constituency of the National Assembly of France

- Paris, showing its post 2012 legislative constituencies
- Deputy: Danielle Simonnet; LFI
- Department: Paris
- Registered voters: 76,203

The 15th constituency of Paris (French: Quinzième circonscription de Paris) is a French legislative constituency in the Paris département (75). Like the other 576 French constituencies, it elects one MP using the two-round system. The constituency is in the east of the city. Before the 2010 redistricting of French legislative constituencies, the 15th constituency referred to a constituency in the west of the city, and before the 1986 redistricting it was in the south.

15th constituency of Paris
- inline Constituency of the National Assembly of France

- Paris, showing its legislative constituencies between 1988 and 2012
- Member: constituency abolished, 2012
- Department: Paris

Map of Paris constituencies in 1981.

== Historic representation ==
Election	Member	Party	Observation	Source
1958	Julien Tardieu	CNIP		
1962	Michel de Grailly	UNR		
1967	Michel de Grailly	UDR		
1968	Michel de Grailly	UDR		
1973	Eugène Claudius-Petit	CDP		
1978	Yves Lancien	RPR		
1981	Yves Lancien	RPR		
1986	Proportional representation - no election by constituency			
1988	Gilbert Gantier	UDF		
1993	Gilbert Gantier	UDF		
1997	Gilbert Gantier	UDF		
2002	Gilbert Gantier	UDF		
2004	Bernard Debré	UMP	Substitute for Gilbert Gantier	
2007	Bernard Debré	UMP		
2012	George Pau-Langevin	PS	Joined government in July 2012	
2012	Fanélie Carrey-Conte	PS	Substitute to George Pau-Langevin	
2016	George Pau-Langevin	PS	Resigned from government	
2017	George Pau-Langevin	PS	Appointed to government.	
2021	Lamia El Aaraje	PS	Won by-election	
2022	Danielle Simonnet	FI		
2024	Danielle Simonnet	FI		

== Election results ==
=== 2024 ===
Candidate	Party	Alliance	First round			Second round		
Candidate	Party	Alliance	Votes	%	+/–	Votes	%	+/–
Danielle Simonnet	LFI diss.		23,103	41.87	N/A	28,858	74.19	N/A
Céline Verzeletti	LFI	NFP	12,619	22.87	-24.44	10,039	25.81	-32.64
Mohamad Gassama	RE	ENS	8,948	16.22	+0.39			
Clotilde Guery	RN		4,969	9.01	+5.19			
François-Marie Didier	LR		1,968	3.57	-2.45			
Philippe Aragon	DVC		1,634	2.96	+0.47			
Aliou Pourchet	UDI		943	1.71	N/A			
Christian Guillot	REC		568	1.01	-2.31			
Arnaud Charvillat	LO		275	0.50	-0.14			
Pierre Augros	DIV		128	0.23	N/A			
Laurent Chrétien Marquet	DIV		32	0.06	N/A			
Audrey Lepage	DIV		1	0.00	N/A			
Valid votes			55,178	98.37	-0.40	38,897	87.14	-7.18
Blank votes			605	1.08	+0.19	4,491	10.06	+5.73
Null votes			312	0.56	+0.21	1,251	2.80	+1.45
Turnout			56,095	70.47	+16.97	44,639	56.08	+8.16
Abstentions			23,503	29.53	-16.97	34,959	43.92	-8.16
Registered voters			79,598			79,598		
Source: Ministry of the Interior, Le Monde
Result						LFI HOLD		

=== 2022 ===
Legislative Election 2022: Paris's 15th constituency
Party	Candidate	Votes	%	±%
LFI (NUPÉS)	Danielle Simonnet	19,772	47.31	-2.75
PS	Lamia El Aaraje*	7,469	17.87	−7.95
LREM (Ensemble)	Mohamad Gassama	6,616	15.83	N/A
LR (UDC)	François-Marie Didier	2,517	6.02	−12.60
RN	Marie-Josée Boulaire	1,597	3.82	N/A
REC	Philippe Houplain	1,387	3.32	N/A
DVC	Philippe Aragon	1,040	2.49	N/A
Others	N/A	1,398		
Turnout		42,321	53.50	+37.95
2nd round result
LFI (NUPÉS)	Danielle Simonnet	20,897	58.45	+15.01
PS	Lamia El Aaraje*	14,856	41.55	−15.01
Turnout		35,753	47.92	+31.56
LFI gain from PS				

* PS candidate, not supported by NUPES, but supported by her own party; the only dissident candidate supported by a party within the NUPES alliance.

=== 2021 by-election ===
2021 by-election: Paris's 15th constituency
Party	Candidate	Votes	%	±%
PS	Lamia El Aaraje	3,010	25.82	+1.69
LFI	Danielle Simonnet	2,437	20.90	+2.24
LR	François-Marie Didier	2,171	18.62	+9.70
EELV	Antoinette Guhl	2,160	18.53	+7.66
PCF	Thomas Roger	1,239	10.63	+6.08
DVD	Jean-Damien de Sinzogan	449	3.85	N/A
Far-left	Sarah Gardent	130	1.12	N/A
DIV	Farid Ghehioueche	63	0.54	N/A
Turnout		12,029	15.55	−35.91
2nd round result
PS	Lamia El Aaraje	6,678	56.56	−3.73
LFI	Danielle Simonnet	5,128	43.44	+3.73
Turnout		12,665	16.36	−26.95
PS hold				

=== 2017 ===
Legislative Election 2017: Paris's 15th constituency
Party	Candidate	Votes	%	±%
PS	George Pau-Langevin	9,258	24.13	−22.88
LFI	Mehdi Kemoune	7,158	18.66	N/A
DVD	Philippe Aragon	6,418	16.73	N/A
EELV	Antoinette Guhl	4,171	10.87	+2.99
LR	Atanase Périfan	3,421	8.92	−9.04
FN	Christophe Versini	1,771	4.62	−2.05
PCF	Jacques Baudrier	1,746	4.55	−7.89
DVG	Dalila Fasfar	918	2.39	N/A
Others	N/A	3,507		
Turnout		39,242	51.49	−5.64
2nd round result
PS	George Pau-Langevin	18,039	60.29	−13.21
LFI	Mehdi Kemoune	11,880	39.71	N/A
Turnout		33,003	43.31	−9.00
PS hold		Swing		

=== 2012 ===
Legislative Election 2012: Paris's 15th constituency
Party	Candidate	Votes	%
PS	George Pau-Langevin	19,858	47.01
UMP	Nathalie Fanfant	7,584	17.96
FG	Didier Le Reste	5,254	12.44
EELV	Arlette Zilberg	3,328	7.88
FN	Geneviève Beduneau	2,819	6.67
MoDem	Sonia Ouertani	1,344	3.18
Others	N/A	2,051	
Turnout		42,238	57.13
2nd round result
PS	George Pau-Langevin	28,421	73.50
UMP	Nathalie Fanfant	10,247	26.50
Turnout		38,668	52.31
PS win (new boundaries)			

=== 2007 ===
Elections between 1988 and 2007 were based on the 1988 boundaries.

Map of Paris Constituencies, 1988-2007 elections

Legislative Election 2007: Paris's 15th constituency
Party	Candidate	Votes	%	±%
UMP	Bernard Debre	16,521	64.91	
DVD	Claude Fain	2,998	11.78	
MoDem	Valérie Sachs	1,834	7.21	
PS	Ghislaine Salmat	1,755	6.90	
FN	Jean Mairey	678	2.66	
Others	N/A	1,665		
Turnout		25,575	58.44	
UMP hold				

=== 2002 ===
Legislative Election 2002: Paris's 15th constituency
Party	Candidate	Votes	%	±%
UMP	Laurent Dominati	8,193	32.38	
UDF	Gilbert Gantier	7,574	29.93	
PS	Bariza Khiari	2,344	9.26	
FN	Farid Smahi	1,434	5.67	
DVD	David Alphand	1,356	5.36	
DVD	Pierre Gaboriau	1,313	5.19	
UDF	Claude Fain	893	3.53	
DIV	Thomas Vandeville	544	2.15	
Others	N/A	1,559		
Turnout		25,531	66.14	
2nd round result
UDF	Gilbert Gantier	10,195	53.09	
UMP	Laurent Dominati	9,007	46.91	
Turnout		20,160	52.54	
UDF hold				

=== 1997 ===
Legislative Election 1997: Paris's 15th constituency
Party	Candidate	Votes	%	±%
UDF	Gilbert Gantier	14,542	60.14	
PS	Bariza Khiari	2,602	10.76	
FN	Patrick Brocard	2,598	10.74	
DVD	Patrick Formey de Saint-Louvent	1,306	5.40	
DVD	Jean-Christophe Mounicq	1,216	5.03	
Others	N/A	1,916		
Turnout		24,791	59.81	
UDF hold				
