= Sophie Métadier =

French politician

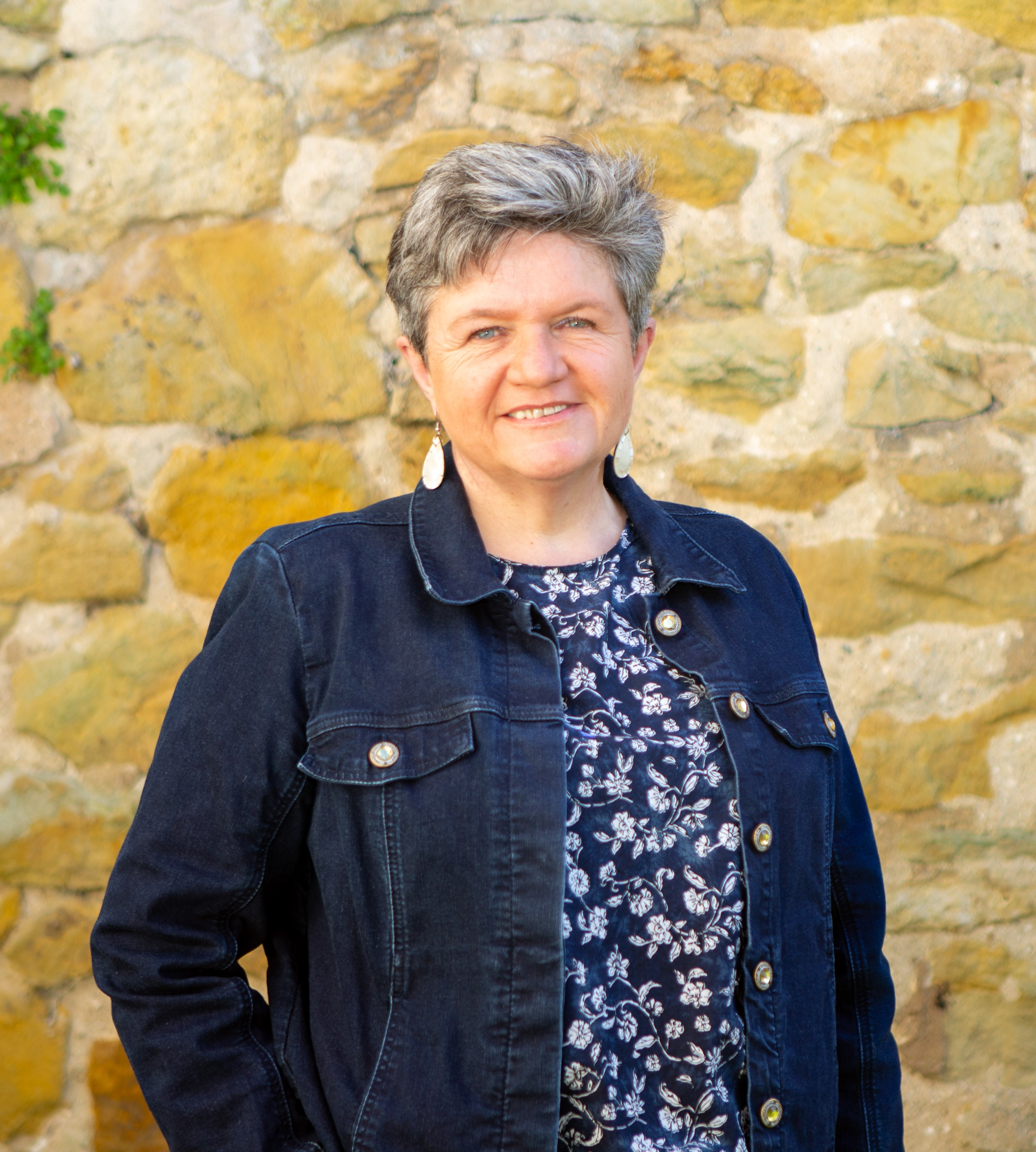

Member of the National Assembly for Indre-et-Loire's 3rd constituency
- In office 7 June 2021 – 21 June 2022
- Preceded by: Sophie Auconie
- Succeeded by: Henri Alfandari

Personal details
- Born: 26 April 1961 (age 64) Paris, France
- Party: Union of Democrats and Independents

Sophie Métadier (born 26 April 1961) is a French urban planner and politician of the Union of Democrats and Independents who has served as a Member of Parliament since 2021.

== Political career ==
She was elected in a by-election triggered by the resignation of Sophie Auconie.

She lost her seat in the first round of the 2022 legislative election.
