= Val-d'Oise's 1st constituency =

Constituency of the French Fifth Republic

- Constituency for the National Assembly
- Boundary of Val-d'Oise's 1st constituency in Val-d'Oise

- Location of Val-d'Oise within France
- Department: Val-d'Oise
- Region: Île-de-France
- Population: 124,279 (2013)
- Electorate: 82,637 (2018)

Current constituency
- Deputy: Emilie Chandler
- Political party: Agir
- Parliamentary group: RE

Val-d'Oise's 1st constituency is one of ten French legislative constituencies in the department of Val-d'Oise. It is currently represented by Antoine Savignat of The Republicans (LR).

== Historic representation ==
Legislature	Start of mandate	End of mandate	Deputy	Party
3rd	3 April 1967	30 May 1968	Michel Poniatowski	RI
4th	11 July 1968	1 April 1973	Michel Poniatowski	RI
5th	2 April 1973	6 May 1973	Michel Poniatowski	RI
5th	7 May 1973	2 April 1978	Yves de Kervéguen	RI
6th	3 April 1978	22 May 1981	Alain Richard	PS
7th	2 July 1981	1 April 1986	Alain Richard	PS
8th	2 April 1986	14 May 1988	Proportional representation	
9th	23 June 1988	4 April 1992	Jean-Philippe Lachenaud	UDF
9th	5 April 1992	1 April 1993	Vacant	
10th	2 April 1993	21 April 1997	Philippe Houillon	UDF
11th	12 June 1997	18 June 2002	Philippe Houillon	UMP
12th	19 June 2002	19 June 2007	Philippe Houillon	UMP
13th	20 June 2007	19 June 2012	Philippe Houillon	UMP
14th	20 June 2012	20 June 2017	Philippe Houillon	UMP
15th	21 June 2017	16 November 2018	Isabelle Muller-Quoy	REM
15th	16 November 2018	4 February 2018	Vacant	
15th	5 February 2018	22 June 2022	Antoine Savignat	LR
16th	22 June 2022	ongoing	Emilie Chandler	Agir

== Elections ==
=== 2024 ===
Candidate	Party	Alliance	First round			Second round		
Candidate	Party	Alliance	Votes	%	+/–	Votes	%	+/–
Anne Sicard	RN		18,823	33.65	+12.62	21,025	37.51	N/A
Maximillien Jules-Arthur	LFI	NFP	17,230	30.80	+2.60	20,534	36.63	-10.84
Émilie Chandler	RE	ENS	14,244	25.46	+1.68	14,494	25.86	-26.67
Michel Richard	LR		3,468	6.20	-5.75			
Barbara Géhan	LO		826	1.48	+0.46			
Lionel Lessaint	DLF		755	1.35	-0.99			
Laure de Garils	REC		574	1.03	-4.01			
Sami Lah	DIV		21	0.04	N/A			
Ethel Soussi	DIV		0	0.00	N/A			
Valid votes			55,941	97.33	-0.89	56,053	97.11	+5.59
Blank votes			1,147	2.00	+0.57	1,326	2.30	-4.06
Null votes			386	0.67	+0.32	340	0.59	-1.53
Turnout			57,474	68.41	+19.40	57,719	68.69	+21.48
Abstentions			26,542	31.59	-19.40	26,315	31.31	-21.48
Registered voters			84,016			84,034		
Source: Ministry of the Interior, Le Monde
Result						RN GAIN FROM RE		

=== 2022 ===
Legislative Election 2022: Val-d'Oise's 1st constituency
Party	Candidate	Votes	%	±%
LFI (NUPÉS)	Leïla Ivorra	11,230	28.20	+1.68
Agir (Ensemble)	Emilie Chandler	9,472	23.78	-5.50
RN	Philippe Pierre	8,377	21.03	+10.92
LR (UDC)	Antoine Savignat	4,760	11.95	−11.72
REC	Erwan Attagnant	2,007	5.04	N/A
DVE	Albert Lapeyre	1,816	4.56	N/A
DLF (UPF)	Lionel Lessaint	930	2.34	−1.97
DVE	Sanrine Barbier	831	2.09	N/A
EXG	Barbara Gehan	405	1.02	N/A
Turnout		40,549	49.01	+28.68
2nd round result
Agir (Ensemble)	Emilie Chandler	18,777	52.53	N/A
LFI (NUPÉS)	Leïla Ivorra	16,969	47.47	N/A
Turnout		35,746	47.21	+28.12
Agir gain from LR				

=== 2018 by-election ===
Candidate	Party	First round			Second round		
Candidate	Party	Votes	%	+/–	Votes	%	+/–
Isabelle Muller-Quoy	REM	4,768	29.28	–6.65	6,762	48.55	–5.69
Antoine Savignat	LR–UDI	3,855	23.67	+5.92	7,167	51.45	+5.69
Leïla Saïb	FI	1,867	11.47	+1.34			
Stéphane Capdet	FN	1,647	10.11	–5.19			
Sandra Nguyen-Derosier	PS	1,121	6.88	+1.40			
Bénédicte Ariès	EELV	1,009	6.20	+2.33			
Jean-Paul Nowak	DLF	702	4.31	+4.31			
Huguette François	PDF	429	2.63	+1.36			
Brigitte Poli	PCF	320	1.97	–0.60			
Hélène Halbin	LO	204	1.25	+0.46			
Denise Cornet	LP	193	1.19	+1.19			
Christophe Hayes	UPR	169	1.04	+0.07			
Votes		16,284	100.00	–	13,929	100.00	–
Valid votes		16,284	97.24	–0.80	13,929	88.69	+0.77
Blank votes		332	2.04	+0.46	1,210	7.70	–1.79
Null votes		130	0.80	+0.35	567	3.61	+1.02
Turnout		16,746	20.33	–27.76	15,706	19.09	–20.51
Abstentions		65,891	79.67	+27.76	66,550	80.91	+20.51
Registered voters		82,353			82,256		
Source: Préfecture du Val d'Oise, Préfecture du Val d'Oise

=== 2017 ===
Candidate	Label	First round		Second round	
Candidate	Label	Votes	%	Votes	%
Isabelle Muller-Quoy	REM	13,817	35.93	15,400	54.23
Antoine Savignat	LR	6,827	17.75	12,996	45.77
Denise Cornet	FN	5,886	15.31		
Leïla Saïb	FI	3,895	10.13		
Sandra Nguyen Derosier	PS	2,107	5.48		
Benedicte Aries	ECO	1,486	3.86		
Brigitte Poli	PCF	988	2.57		
Albert Lapeyre	ECO	839	2.18		
Michel Boisnault	DVD	719	1.87		
Huguette François	EXD	491	1.28		
Lionel Mabille	DIV	374	0.97		
Thierry Sallantin	ECO	321	0.83		
Hélène Halbin	EXG	304	0.79		
Brigitte Gilibert	EXD	300	0.78		
Mistafa Fanouni	DIV	94	0.24		
Élisabeth Gaucher	REG	2	0.01		
Katia Lebaillif	DIV	2	0.01		
Rudy Bruyelle	DIV	0	0.00		
Anne-Sophie Vuillemin	DVD	0	0.00		
Votes		38,452	100.00	28,396	100.00
Valid votes		38,452	98.04	28,396	87.92
Blank votes		599	1.53	3,066	9.49
Null votes		168	0.43	837	2.59
Turnout		39,219	48.09	32,299	39.61
Abstentions		42,328	51.91	49,250	60.39
Registered voters		81,547		81,549	
Source: Ministry of the Interior

=== 2012 ===
Candidate	Label	First round		Second round	
Candidate	Label	Votes	%	Votes	%
Philippe Houillon	UMP	16,539	36.17	23,241	51.84
Tatiana Gründler	PS	16,363	35.79	21,593	48.16
Brigitte Gilbert	FN	6,878	15.04		
Alexis Zakharevitch	FG	2,606	5.70		
Maurice Chayet	MoDem	873	1.91		
Albert Lapeyre	ECO	704	1.54		
Huguette François	EXD	427	0.93		
Milène Clichy	ECO	375	0.82		
Marc Lahmer	DVD	362	0.79		
Hélène Halbin	EXG	208	0.45		
Jérémy Thebault	DVD	151	0.33		
Jean-Marc Petit	EXG	122	0.27		
Josée Tilquin	DVD	112	0.24		
Votes		45,720	100.00	44,834	100.00
Valid votes		45,720	98.88	46,976	97.57
Blank or null votes		518	1.12	1,117	2.43
Turnout		46,238	58.77	45,951	58.39
Abstentions		32,441	41.23	32,747	41.61
Registered voters		78,679		78,698	
Source: Ministry of the Interior

=== 2007 ===
Legislative Election 2007: Val-d'Oise's 1st constituency
Party	Candidate	Votes	%	±%
UMP	Philippe Houillon	23,009	49.56	
PS	Corine Drolon	10,666	22.97	
MoDem	Alexandra Canavelis	3,896	8.39	
FN	Huguette Francois	2,302	4.96	
LV	Michel Vampouille	1,577	3.40	
Far left	Yves Lefrancois	1,346	2.90	
PCF	Christine Appiani	989	2.13	
Others	N/A	2,646		
Turnout		47,098	61.19	
2nd round result
UMP	Philippe Houillon	25,358	58.64	
PS	Corine Drolon	17,884	41.36	
Turnout		44,321	57.58	
UMP hold				

=== 2002 ===
Legislative Election 2002: Val-d'Oise's 1st constituency
Party	Candidate	Votes	%	±%
UMP	Philippe Houillon	20,373	44.86	
LV	Valerie Battaglia	13,104	28.85	
FN	Huguette Francois	6,665	14.68	
PR	Marilyne Bureau	1,056	2.33	
LCR	Marie-Thérèse Patry	1,026	2.26	
DVE	Sylviane Farjon	1,021	2.25	
Others	N/A	2,170		
Turnout		46,193	65.99	
2nd round result
UMP	Philippe Houillon	23,890	58.18	
LV	Valerie Battaglia	17,173	41.82	
Turnout		42,527	60.76	
UMP gain from UDF				

=== 1997 ===
Legislative Election 1997: Val-d'Oise's 1st constituency
Party	Candidate	Votes	%	±%
UDF	Philippe Houillon	13,577	30.03	
PS	Jean-Pierre Bequet	11,268	24.92	
FN	Marie-Thérèse Philippe	9,281	20.53	
PCF	Evelyne Gilibert	3,755	8.31	
LV	Pascal Tourbe	2,109	4.66	
DVD	Albert Michaud	1,199	2.65	
GE	Jean-Pierre Sayouz	1,047	2.32	
Others	N/A	2,976		
Turnout		47,214	68.93	
2nd round result
UDF	Philippe Houillon	21,183	43.07	
PS	Jean-Pierre Bequet	20,640	41.96	
FN	Marie-Thérèse Philippe	7,362	14.97	
Turnout		50,738	74.08	
UDF hold				
