= Faustine Maliar =

French politician (born 1995)

Member of the Regional Council of Hauts-de-France
- Incumbent
- Assumed office 15 December 2015

Personal details
- Born: 7 June 1995 (age 30)
- Party: The Republicans

Faustine Maliar (born 7 June 1995) is a French politician. She has been a member of the Regional Council of Hauts-de-France since 2015, and has served as vice president of the council since 2025. She was the youngest person elected to the council in the 2015 regional elections. She was a candidate for the National Assembly in Pas-de-Calais's 6th constituency in the 2021 by-election and the 2022 legislative election. In the 2019 European Parliament election, she was a candidate for member of the European Parliament.
