= Isabelle Muller-Quoy =

French politician

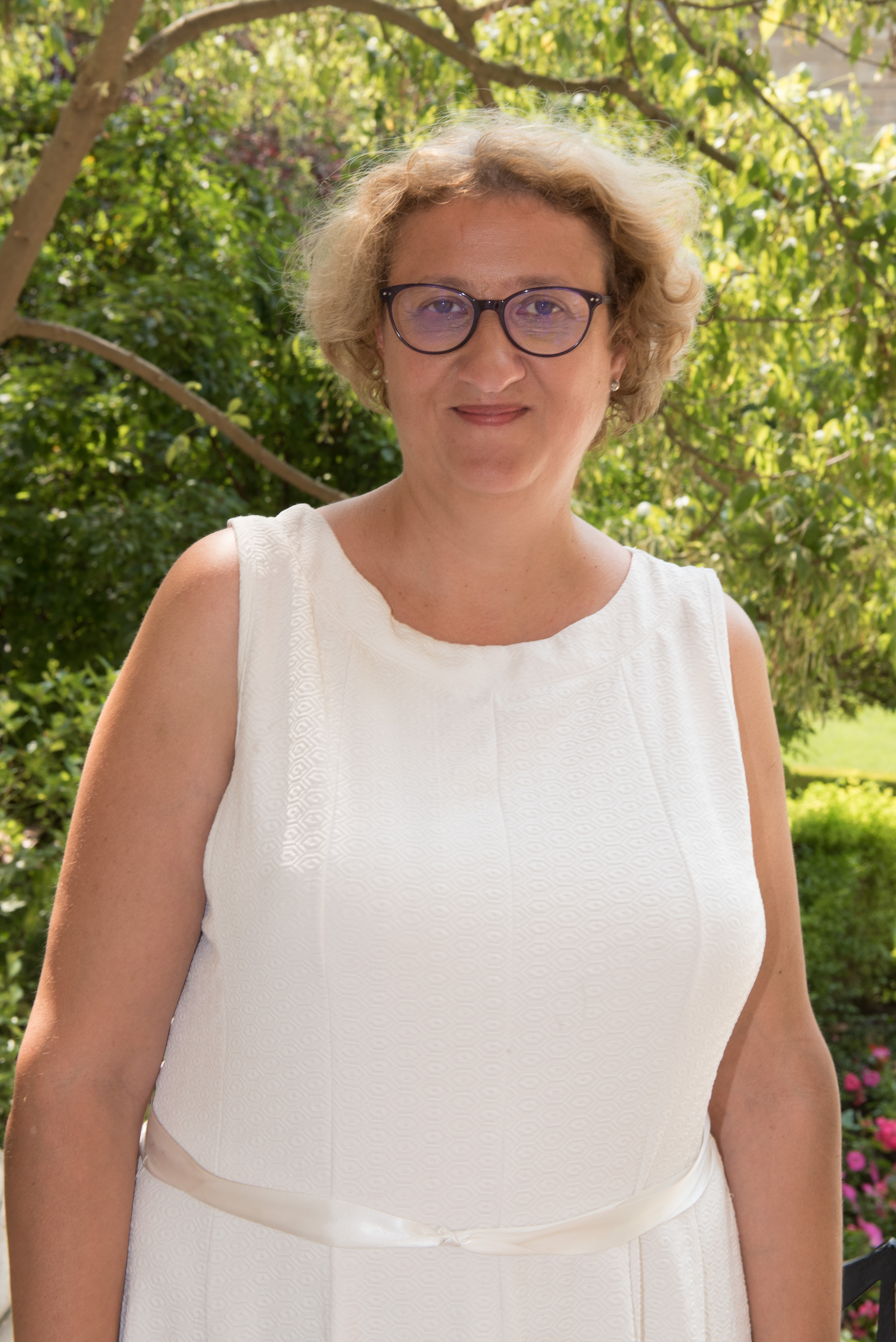
Isabelle Muller-Quoy in June 2017.

Isabelle Muller-Quoy is a French politician who represented La République En Marche! in the French National Assembly from June to November 2017, representing Val-d'Oise's 1st constituency. Her election was invalidated on 16 November 2017 after it was determined that her substitute, Michel Alexeef, was ineligible as a result of his having served as a president of an employment tribunal within the constituency, disqualifying him under the electoral code. A by-election for the constituency was subsequently held in 2018, in which she was defeated in the second round, receiving 48.55% of the vote against Antoine Savignat, candidate of The Republicans (LR).
