= Law Committee (French National Assembly) =

Standing committee of the French National Assembly

The Constitutional Acts, Legislation and General Administration Committee (French: Commission des Lois constitutionnelles, de la Législation et de l'Administration générale de la République), known as the Law Committee, is one of the eight standing committees of the French National Assembly.

== Chairs ==
- Yaël Braun-Pivet - 15th legislature of the French Fifth Republic
