= Olga Givernet =

French politician

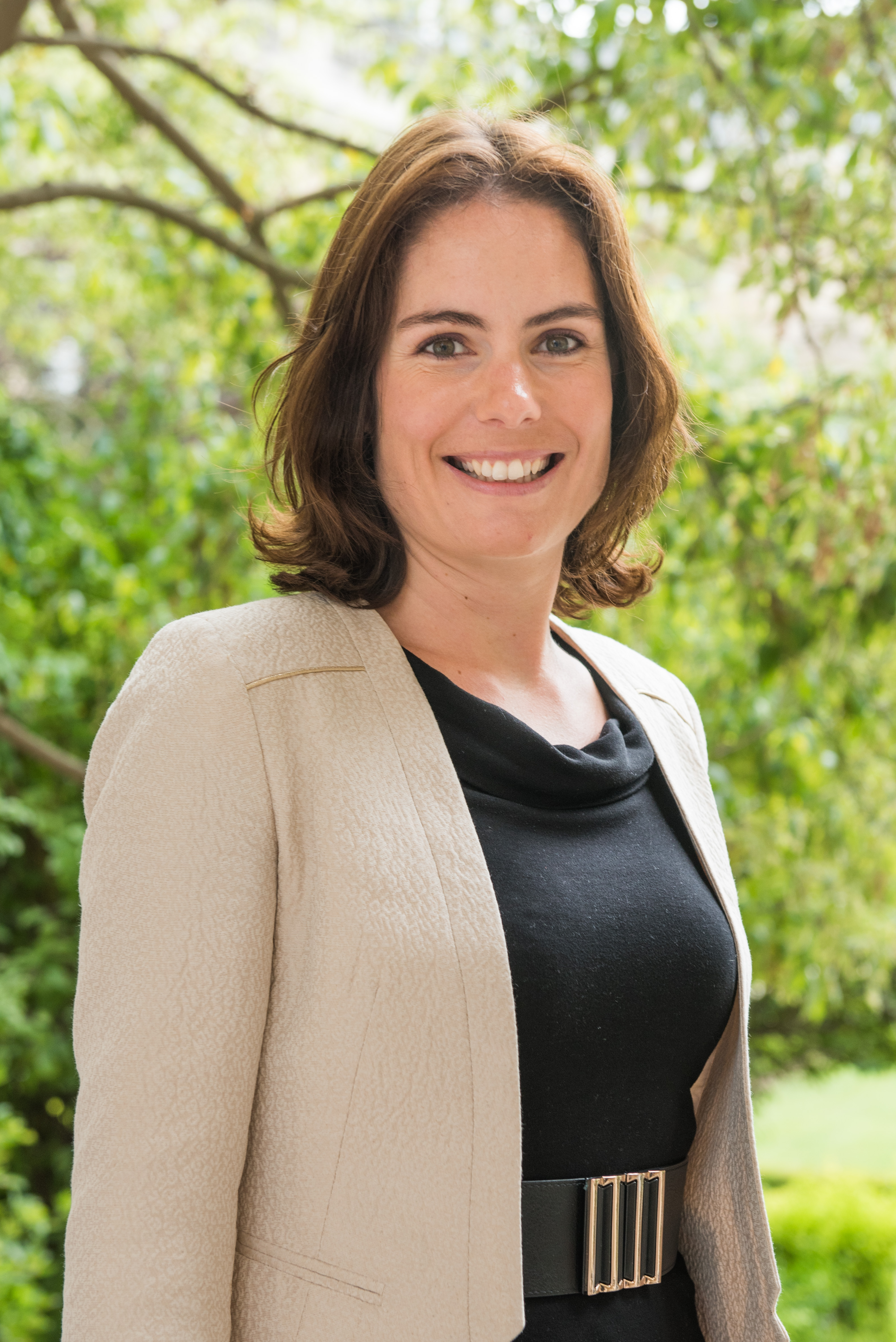

Minister Delegate for Energy
- Incumbent
- Assumed office 21 September 2024
- President: Emmanuel Macron
- Prime Minister: Michel Barnier
- Preceded by: Roland Lescure

Member of the National Assembly for Ain's 3rd constituency
- In office 21 June 2017 – 21 October 2024
- Preceded by: Stéphanie Pernod-Beaudon
- Succeeded by: Sophie Delorme

Member of the Regional council of Auvergne-Rhône-Alpes
- In office 13 December 2015 – 1 July 2021
- President: Laurent Wauquiez

Member of the Municipal council of Saint-Genis-Pouilly
- In office 30 March 2014 – 18 July 2017

Personal details
- Born: 17 October 1981 (age 45) Saint-Germain-en-Laye, France
- Party: Renaissance
- Education: Polytech'Paris-UPMC
- Occupation: Aeronautical Engineer

Olga Givernet (born 17 October 1981) is a French politician of Renaissance (RE) who has been serving as a member of the French National Assembly since the 2017 elections, representing the department of Ain.

From September to December 2024, Givernet briefly served as Delegated Minister for Energy in the government of Prime Minister Michel Barnier.

== Education and early career ==
Givernet completed her secondary studies in Yvelines. At age 23, she obtained an engineer's degree in electronics and computer science for embedded systems and a master's degree.

In 2015, Givernet decided with her husband to settle in Auckland where she found a job as an avionics engineer, then project manager at the design office of Air New Zealand. After spending three years in New Zealand, she returned to France in 2017 and settled with her husband in Ain to work in jet maintenance centres at Geneva Airport.

== Political career ==
=== Career in local politics ===
In 2013, Givernet joined the Democratic Movement (MoDem). In March 2014, she was elected city councilor of Saint-Genis-Pouilly on the list of the outgoing mayor, Hubert Bertrand (DVG). She becomes in this capacity councilor of the community of communes of the Country of Gex.

In autumn 2015 Givernet decided to leave MoDem when the party decided to ally with the Republicans led by Laurent Wauquiez, whose ideas she did not share, for the regional elections in Auvergne-Rhône-Alpes in December 2015. She was elected on 4th position on the union list of the left Ain, led by Jean-Jack Queyranne.

Due to the limitation of the plurality of the mandates, Givernet resigned from her position of municipal councilor of Saint-Genis-Pouilly on 18 July 2017.

=== Member of the French National Assembly ===
In the spring of 2016, Givernet ran for the by-election in the 3rd constituency of Ain, prompted by the resignation of incumbent Etienne Blanc. Without any label, she presented herself as "democrat", claiming to be centrist and declaring herself to be recognized by Emmanuel Macron. She was defeated in the first round on 13 June 2016 with a score of 10.05% of the votes cast.

Without a political label, Givernet joined the summer 2016 movement En Marche! created by Emmanuel Macron, of which she became the referent in the Ain. She was chosen in May 2017 as the party's candidate in the 3rd constituency of Ain for the 2017 parliamentary elections. After obtaining in the first round 45.30% of the votes cast, she was elected in the second round with 61.86% of the votes cast against the outgoing Stéphanie Pernod-Beaudon.

In parliament, Givernet serves on the Committee on Foreign Affairs, one of the eight standing committees. She also joined the Public Policy Evaluation and Oversight Committee and the Parliamentary Office for the Evaluation of Scientific and Technological Choices. In addition to her committee assignments, she is part of the French-Swiss Parliamentary Friendship Group.

In July 2019, Givernet challenged incumbent chairman Gilles Le Gendre for the leadership of the LREM parliamentary group; Le Gendre was subsequently re-elected in the first round, with Givernet receiving the third highest number of votes after Florent Boudié.

Givernet was re-elected in the 2022 French legislative election. She was re-elected in the 2024 election following the early dissolution of the National Assembly.

=== Career in government ===
In September 2024, Givernet was named ministerial delegate for energy in the Barnier administration. In this capacity, she represented France in the negotiations on a global plastic pollution treaty in late 2024.

== Political positions ==
In May 2018, Givernet co-sponsored an initiative in favour of a bioethics law extending to lesbian and single women free access to fertility treatments such as in vitro fertilisation (IVF) under France's national health insurance; it was one of the campaign promises of President Emmanuel Macron and marked the first major social reform of his five-year term.

In July 2019, Givernet voted in favor of the French ratification of the European Union's Comprehensive Economic and Trade Agreement (CETA) with Canada.
