= Isabelle Valentin =

French politician (born 1962)

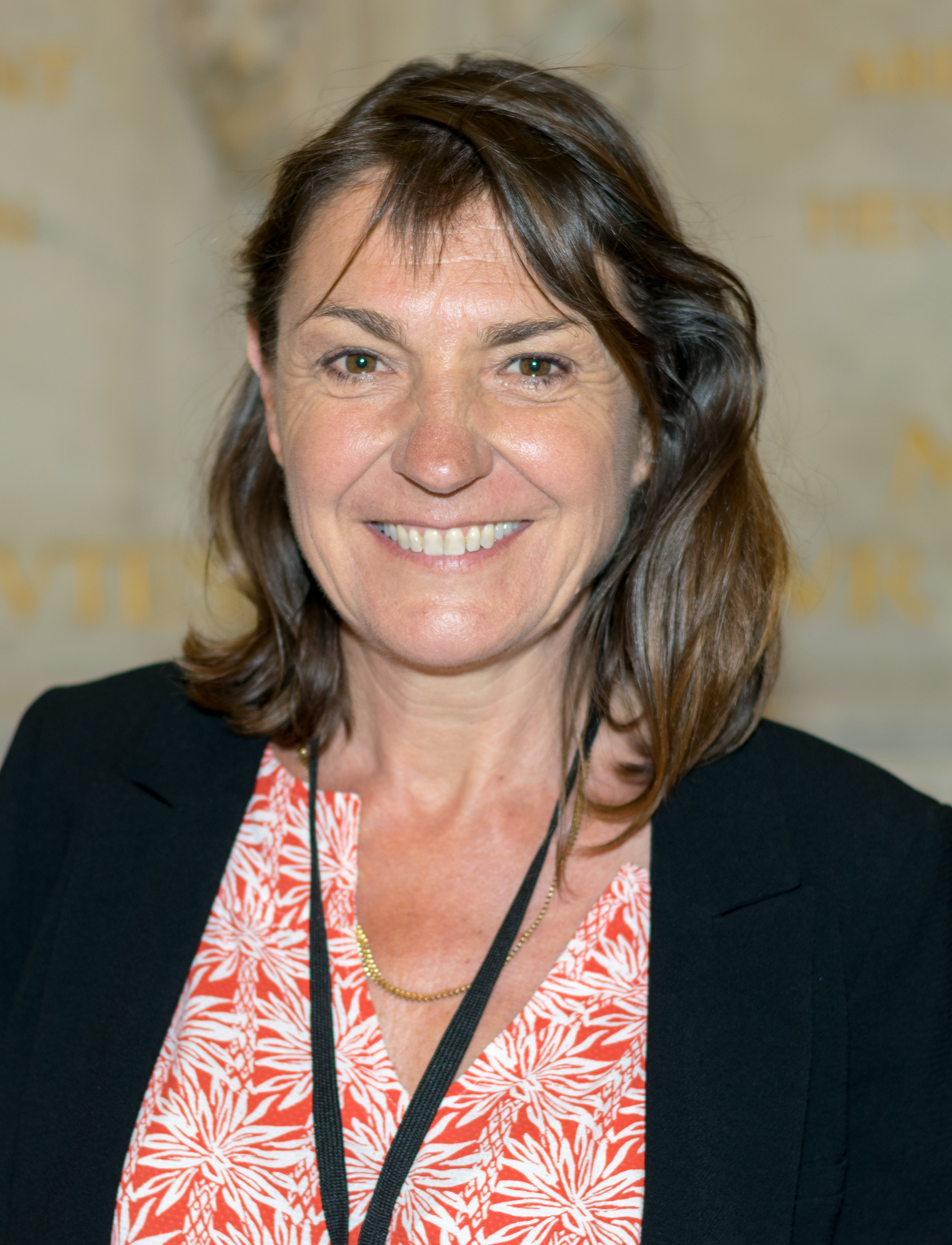

Member of the National Assembly for Haute-Loire's 1st constituency
- In office 21 June 2017 – 9 June 2024
- Preceded by: Laurent Wauquiez
- Succeeded by: Laurent Wauquiez

Departmental councillor of Haute-Loire for the canton of Yssingeaux
- Incumbent
- Assumed office 1 July 2021 Serving with Arthur Liogier
- Preceded by: Madeleine Dubois

Personal details
- Born: 20 January 1962 (age 64) Le Puy-en-Velay, France
- Party: Union for a Popular Movement (until 2015); The Republicans (2015–present)
- Occupation: Market gardener

Isabelle Valentin (French pronunciation: [izabɛl valɑ̃tɛ̃]; born 20 January 1962) is a French market gardener and politician who represented the 1st constituency of Haute-Loire in the National Assembly from 2017 to 2024. She is a member of The Republicans (LR).

== Political career ==
Valentin was elected a member of the Regional Council of Auvergne in 2010 and of the Regional Council of Auvergne-Rhône-Alpes in 2015.

She was first elected to the National Assembly in the 2017 legislative election in the 1st constituency of Haute-Loire, with 58.7% of the second-round vote. In Parliament, Valentin was a member of the Committee on Social Affairs. She was reelected in the 2022 election with 70.2% of the second-round vote. She stood down at the 2024 election, when her seat was won by Regional Council President Laurent Wauquiez, her predecessor and substitute in both 2017 and 2022.

She has also held a seat in the Departmental Council of Haute-Loire for the canton of Yssingeaux since 2021.

== Political positions ==
In The Republicans 2017 leadership election, Valentin endorsed Laurent Wauquiez for the party chairmanship. In the run-up to The Republicans' 2022 convention, she supported Éric Ciotti as new chairman.
