= Haute-Loire's 1st constituency =

Constituency of the National Assembly of France

1st constituency of Haute-Loire
- inline Constituency of the National Assembly of France

- Constituency in Department

- Location of Haute-Loire in France
- Deputy: Laurent Wauquiez; LR
- Department: Haute-Loire

The 1st constituency of Haute-Loire is a French legislative constituency in Haute-Loire.

== Historic representation ==
Election	Member	Party	Notes
1988	Jacques Barrot	UDF	
1993	Jacques Barrot	UDF	
1995	Serge Monnier	UDF	
1997	Jacques Barrot	UDF	
2002	Jacques Barrot	UMP	
2004	Laurent Wauquiez	UMP	
2007	Laurent Wauquiez	UMP	
2007	Jean-Pierre Marcon	UMP	Substitute for Laurent Wauquiez, replaced him when Wauquiez was appointed Government spokesperson
2012	Laurent Wauquiez	UMP	
2017	Isabelle Valentin	LR	
2022	Isabelle Valentin	LR	
2024	Laurent Wauquiez	LR	

== Election results ==
=== 2024 ===
Candidate	Party	Alliance	First round			Second round		
Candidate	Party	Alliance	Votes	%	+/–	Votes	%	+/–
Laurent Wauquiez	LR		27,013	36.80	-8.46	42,828	61.61	-8.16
Alexandre Heuzey	RN		25,091	34.18	+19.95	26,684	38.39	new
Celline Gacon	LÉ	NFP	13,694	18.66	-0.30	WITHDREW		
Cécile Marcelle-Gallien	MoDEM	ENS	6,932	9.44	-4.80			
Electre Dracos	LO		668	0.91	-0.08			
Votes			73,398	100.00		69,512	100.00	
Valid votes			73,398	98.04	-0.28	69,512	93.94	-0.92
Blank votes			1,020	1.36	+0.14	3,408	4.61	+1.02
Null votes			448	0.60	+0.14	1,075	1.45	-0.10
Turnout			74,866	72.89	+20.44	73,995	72.04	+24.05
Abstentions			27,850	27.11	-20.44	28,721	27.96	-24.05
Registered voters			102,716			102,716		
Source: Ministry of the Interior, Le Monde
Result			LR HOLD					

=== 2022 ===
Legislative Election 2022: Haute-Loire's 1st constituency
Party	Candidate	Votes	%	±%
LR (UDC)	Isabelle Valentin	23,714	45.26	+4.37
EELV (NUPÉS)	Celline Gacon	9,933	18.96	+4.63
MoDem (Ensemble)	Cécile Gallien	7,459	14.24	−16.83
RN	Suzanne Fourets	7,458	14.23	+4.82
REC	Emmanuelle Poumeau De Lafforest	1,368	2.61	N/A
DVE	Dominique Samard	1,283	2.45	N/A
Others	N/A	1,380	-	−
Turnout		52,395	52.45	−2.52
2nd round result
LR (UDC)	Isabelle Valentin	32,478	70.22	+11.50
EELV (NUPÉS)	Celline Gacon	13,773	29.78	N/A
Turnout		46,251	47.99	−2.77
LR hold				

=== 2017 ===
Candidate	Label	First round		Second round	
Candidate	Label	Votes	%	Votes	%
Isabelle Valentin	LR	21,615	40.89	26,705	58.72
Cécile Gallien	REM	16,423	31.07	18,772	41.28
Fabien Albertini	FN	4,974	9.41		
Martine Dejean	FI	4,721	8.93		
Fabrice Farison	PS	1,453	2.75		
Anne Badian-Lhermet	ECO	1,402	2.65		
Yves Prat	DVG	940	1.78		
Philippe Cochet	ECO	471	0.89		
Gabriel Cardaire	DLF	421	0.80		
Pierre Michallet	EXG	259	0.49		
Michaël Masclet	DIV	178	0.34		
Hélène Denis	DIV	0	0.00		
Votes		52,857	100.00	45,477	100.00
Valid votes		52,857	98.33	45,477	93.46
Blank votes		620	1.15	2,217	4.56
Null votes		275	0.51	963	1.98
Turnout		53,752	54.97	48,657	49.76
Abstentions		44,035	45.03	49,133	50.24
Registered voters		97,787		97,790	
Source: Ministry of the Interior

=== 2012 ===
2012 legislative election in Haute-Loire's 1st constituency
Candidate	Party	First round		Second round	
Candidate	Party	Votes	%	Votes	%
Laurent Wauquiez	UMP	30,916	49.74%	36,651	63.95%
Guy Vocanson	PS	14,569	23.44%	20,662	36.05%
Pierre Cheynet	FN	7,257	11.68%		
Gustave Alirol	EELV–RPS–POC	3,895	6.27%		
Yves Prat	FG	2,943	4.73%		
Anne-Audrey Perrin-Patural	MoDem	542	0.87%		
Edouard Ducray	PP	380	0.61%		
Lucien Seytre	LT	336	0.54%		
Max Chambon	POI	297	0.48%		
Philippe Roche	SE	280	0.45%		
Christophe Mezzasoma	AEI	274	0.44%		
Philippe Cochet	MEI	262	0.42%		
Claudette Balleydier	LO	205	0.33%		
Valid votes		62,156	98.62%	57,313	97.32%
Spoilt and null votes		871	1.38%	1,579	2.68%
Votes cast / turnout		63,027	65.79%	58,892	61.48%
Abstentions		32,776	34.21%	36,905	38.52%
Registered voters		95,803	100.00%	95,797	100.00%

=== 2007 ===
Legislative Election 2007: Haute-Loire's 1st constituency
Party	Candidate	Votes	%	±%
UMP	Laurent Wauquiez	34,563	58.13	
PS	Renée Vaggiani	12,074	20.31	
MoDem	Cécile Gallien	4,176	7.02	
FN	Pierre Cheynet	2,661	4.48	
EXG	Martine Dejean	1,432	2.41	
EXG	Sabrina Del Monte	1,333	2.24	
Others	N/A	3,214		
Turnout		60,583	65.05	
UMP hold				

=== 2002 ===
Legislative Election 2002: Haute-Loire's 1st constituency
Party	Candidate	Votes	%	±%
UMP	Jacques Barrot	28,387	49.25	
LV	Jean-Jacques Orfeuvre	13,488	23.40	
FN	Jean-Luc Guillard	7,797	13.53	
LCR	Claude Ganne	1,455	2.52	
REG	Gustave Alirol	1,206	2.09	
CPNT	Michel Dubouchet	1,152	2.00	
Others	N/A	4,157		
Turnout		57,642	67.74	
2nd round result
UMP	Jacques Barrot	31,258	63.09	
LV	Jean-Jacques Orfeuvre	18,290	36.91	
Turnout		49,548	59.50	
UMP gain from FD				

=== 1997 ===
Legislative Election 1997: Haute-Loire's 1st constituency
Party	Candidate	Votes	%	±%
FD (UDF)	Jacques Barrot	21,631	39.57	
PS	Jean-Paul Thivel	13,239	24.22	
FN	Thierry Odier	9,576	17.52	
PCF	Bernard Bouet	3,180	5.82	
LV	Michèle Faure	3,052	5.58	
LDI	Bruno Favre	2,161	3.95	
MEI	Annick Hugon	1,330	2.43	
DIV	Alain Friedel	498	0.91	
Turnout		54,667	73.20	
2nd round result
FD (UDF)	Jacques Barrot	30,219	54.71	
PS	Jean-Paul Thivel	25,013	45.29	
Turnout		55,232	74.37	
FD hold				
