= Gustave Alirol =

French politician (1948–2025)

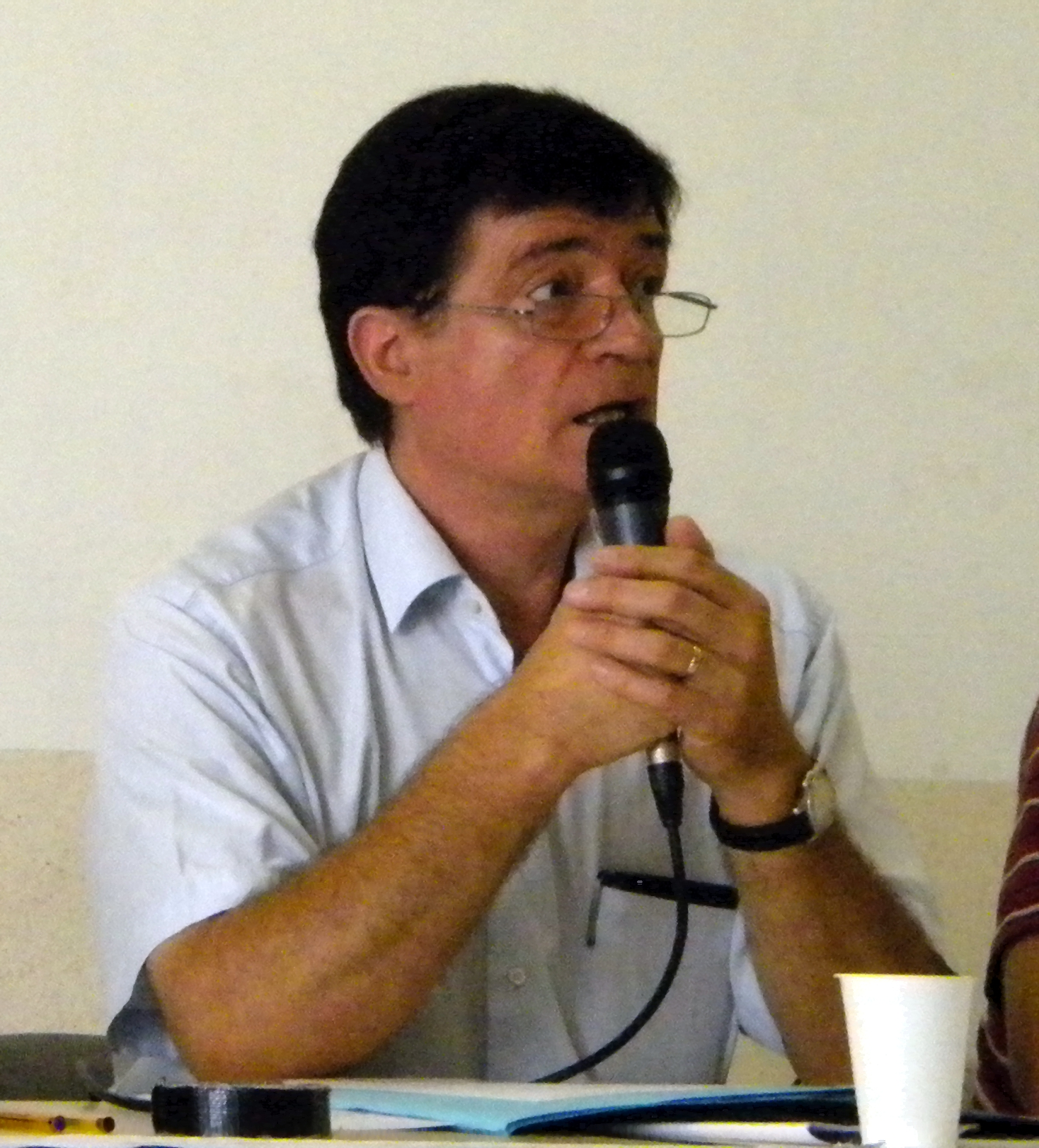
- Alirol in 2012

Member of the General Council of Auvergne
- In office 2010–2015

Mayor of Saint-Hostien
- In office 1983–2008
- Succeeded by: Rolande Touron

Personal details
- Born: 31 August 1948 Le Puy-en-Velay, France
- Died: 14 February 2025 (aged 76) Le Puy-en-Velay, France
- Political party: POC
- Occupation: Academic

Gustave Alirol (31 August 1948 – 14 February 2025) was a French politician of the Occitan Party (POC).

== Life and career ==
Born in Le Puy-en-Velay on 31 August 1948, Alirol was a professor of private law at Jean Moulin University Lyon 3. National secretary of the Occitan Party, he also served as president of Régions et Peuples Solidaires and vice-president of the European Free Alliance. He served as Mayor of Saint-Hostien from 1983 to 2008. In 2010, he was elected to the General Council of Auvergne on the Europe Ecology list, where he placed second after René Souchon. In 2012, he ran for a seat in the National Assembly in Haute-Loire's 1st constituency with Europe Ecology The Greens, earning 6.27% of the first round vote.

Alirol died on 14 February 2025, at the age of 76.
