= Results of the 2024 French legislative election in Landes =

Following the first round of the 2024 French legislative election on 30 June 2024, runoff elections in each constituency where no candidate received a vote share greater than 50 percent were scheduled for 7 July. Candidates permitted to stand in the runoff elections needed to either come in first or second place in the first round or achieve more than 12.5 percent of the votes of the entire electorate (as opposed to 12.5 percent of the vote share due to low turnout).

== Landes ==
=== 1st constituency ===
| Candidate | Party or alliance | | First round | | Second round | |
| Candidate | Party or alliance | | Votes | % | Votes | % |
|---|---|---|---|---|---|---|
| Véronique Fossey | National Rally | | 28,138 | 37.23 | 31,768 | 43.22 |
| Geneviève Darrieussecq | Ensemble | Democratic Movement | 21,353 | 28.25 | 41,736 | 56.78 |
| Marie-Laure Lafargue | New Popular Front | Socialist Party | 20,466 | 27.08 | | |
| Fabienne Chrit | The Republicans | | 3,343 | 4.42 | | |
| Jean-Claude Bon | Far-left | Lutte Ouvrière | 852 | 1.13 | | |
| Dominique Jarreau | Miscellaneous centre | The Centrists | 720 | 0.95 | | |
| Isabelle Henaff | Reconquête | | 700 | 0.93 | | |
| Degny Hermann Amessan | Miscellaneous centre | Independent | 4 | 0.01 | | |
| Total | | | 75,576 | 100.00 | 73,504 | 100.00 |
| Valid votes | | | 75,576 | 96.87 | 73,504 | 93.84 |
| Invalid votes | | | 725 | 0.93 | 1,232 | 1.57 |
| Blank votes | | | 1,714 | 2.20 | 3,589 | 4.58 |
| Total votes | | | 78,015 | 100.00 | 78,325 | 100.00 |
| Registered voters/turnout | | | 109,697 | 71.12 | 109,680 | 71.41 |

=== 2nd constituency ===
| Candidate | Party or alliance | | First round | | Second round | |
| Candidate | Party or alliance | | Votes | % | Votes | % |
|---|---|---|---|---|---|---|
| Ludovic Biesbrouck | National Rally | | 28,264 | 32.60 | 32,167 | 38.19 |
| Lionel Causse | Ensemble | Renaissance | 26,051 | 30.05 | 52,064 | 61.81 |
| Jean-Marc Lespade | New Popular Front | Communist Party | 24,645 | 28.43 | | |
| Marc Vernier | The Republicans | | 4,625 | 5.33 | | |
| Dominique Lecuona | Regionalists | Occitan Party | 1,358 | 1.57 | | |
| Stéphane David | Reconquête | | 918 | 1.06 | | |
| Pascal Demangeot | Far-left | Lutte Ouvrière | 839 | 0.97 | | |
| Total | | | 86,700 | 100.00 | 84,231 | 100.00 |
| Valid votes | | | 86,700 | 96.90 | 84,231 | 93.87 |
| Invalid votes | | | 889 | 0.99 | 1,487 | 1.66 |
| Blank votes | | | 1,886 | 2.11 | 4,012 | 4.47 |
| Total votes | | | 89,475 | 100.00 | 89,730 | 100.00 |
| Registered voters/turnout | | | 124,617 | 71.80 | 124,615 | 72.01 |

=== 3rd constituency ===
| Candidate | Party or alliance | | First round | | Second round | |
| Candidate | Party or alliance | | Votes | % | Votes | % |
|---|---|---|---|---|---|---|
| Boris Vallaud | New Popular Front | Socialist Party | 26,235 | 37.10 | 38,537 | 56.65 |
| Sylvie Franceschini | National Rally | | 25,165 | 35.59 | 29,491 | 43.35 |
| Tom Gillet Duffrechou | Ensemble | Democratic Movement | 11,310 | 16.00 | | |
| Brice Saint-Cricq | The Republicans | | 5,078 | 7.18 | | |
| Christelle Lassort | Miscellaneous centre | Résistons ! | 1,141 | 1.61 | | |
| Christian Delfosse | Reconquête | | 813 | 1.15 | | |
| Carole Voutaz | Far-left | Lutte Ouvrière | 513 | 0.73 | | |
| Matèu Richard | Regionalists | Occitan Party | 451 | 0.64 | | |
| Total | | | 70,706 | 100.00 | 68,028 | 100.00 |
| Valid votes | | | 70,706 | 96.64 | 68,028 | 92.36 |
| Invalid votes | | | 877 | 1.20 | 1,595 | 2.17 |
| Blank votes | | | 1,583 | 2.16 | 4,030 | 5.47 |
| Total votes | | | 73,166 | 100.00 | 73,653 | 100.00 |
| Registered voters/turnout | | | 100,020 | 73.15 | 100,035 | 73.63 |
