= Stéphanie Pernod-Beaudon =

French politician

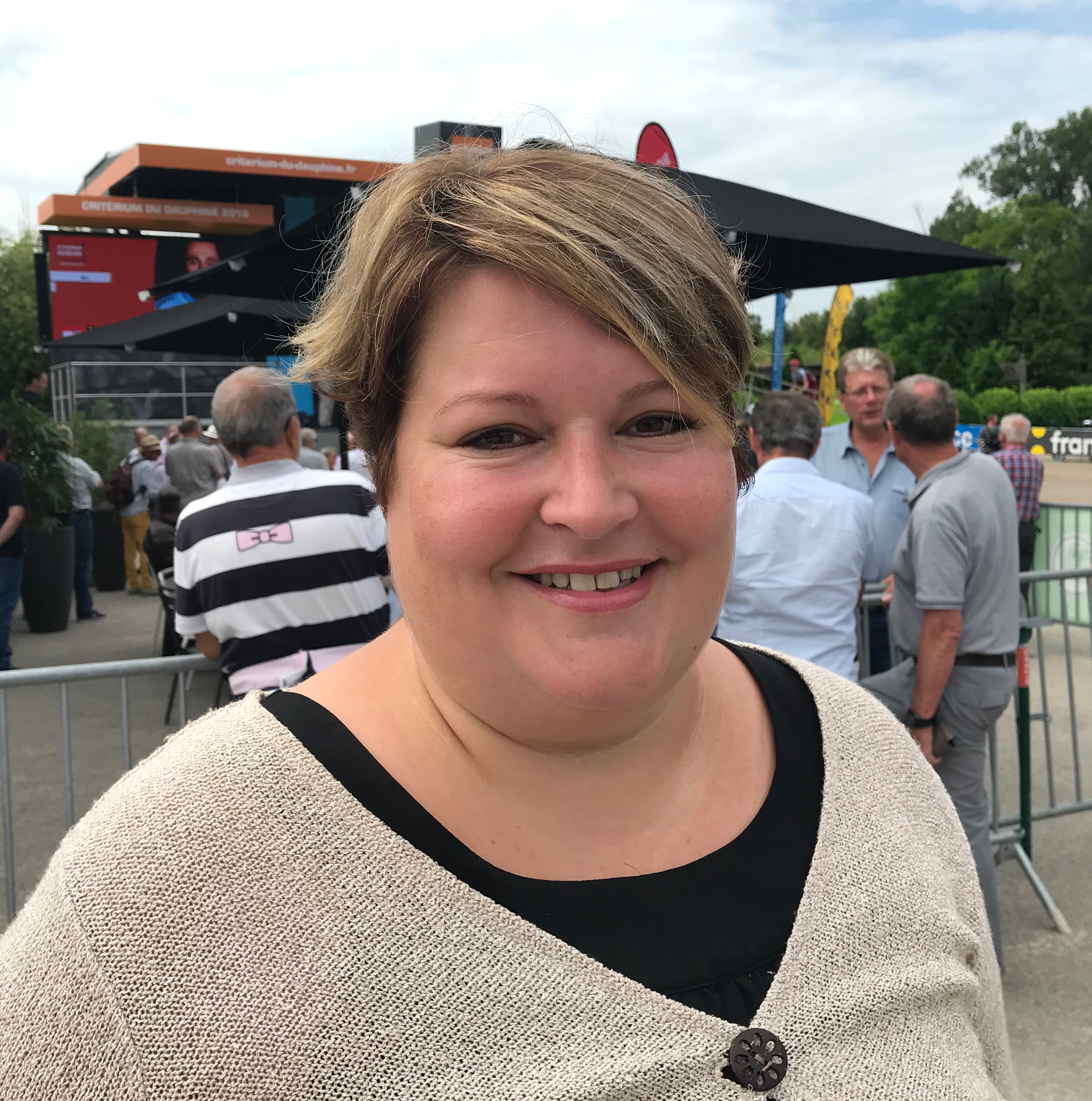
- Stéphanie Pernod-Beaudon in 2018

Member of the Regional council of Auvergne-Rhône-Alpes
- Incumbent
- Assumed office 26 March 2010
- President: Laurent Wauquiez

12th Vice-President of the Regional council of Auvergne-Rhône-Alpes delegated to Vocational training and learning
- Incumbent
- Assumed office 13 December 2015
- Preceded by: Laurent Wauquiez

Member of the National Assembly for Ain's 3rd constituency
- In office 2016–2017
- Preceded by: Étienne Blanc
- Succeeded by: Olga Givernet

Personal details
- Born: 13 October 1978 (age 48) Bourg-en-Bresse, France
- Party: The Republicans

Stéphanie Pernod-Beaudon (born 13 October 1978) is a French politician who was the member of the 14th legislature of the French Fifth Republic for Ain's 3rd constituency.

== Biography ==
In March 2001, Stéphanie Pernod appeared on the list of Bernard Argenti, a candidate for mayor of Hauteville-Lompnes; following his victory, she became deputy mayor.

In March 2008, she was in 6th position on the outgoing mayor's list. As the presidential majority list was defeated in the first round, she served as a municipal councillor for the minority.

In March 2010, she was elected regional councillor in 4th position on the presidential majority list in Ain during the 2010 French regional elections. She chaired the Union of the Right, Center and Associates group (UDC-APP) in the Rhône-Alpes regional council.

In March 2014, she was the head of a DVD list in Hauteville-Lompnes during the 2014 French municipal elections. Her list finished second in the first round and withdrew for the second.

In December 2015, she again appeared in 4th position on the right-wing union list in Ain during the regional elections. She was re-elected and became the 12th vice-president of the Auvergne-Rhône-Alpes regional council, in charge of vocational training, apprenticeship, and sport (2019–2021).

On 7 April 2016, Pernod was appointed a member of the National Council for Employment, Vocational Training and Guidance (CNEFOP).

Following his election to the 1st vice-presidency of the new regional council, Étienne Blanc, affected by the accumulation of mandates, resigned from his position as a deputy. Stéphanie Pernod announced her candidacy to seek the vacant post, with Jean-Yves Hedon as her substitute.

She was elected deputy in the second round, receiving 73.32% of the votes.

A candidate for a new term as deputy during the June 2017 legislative elections, she was defeated in the second round by the La République En Marche! candidate, Olga Givernet.

She was re-elected to the Auvergne-Rhône-Alpes regional council in June 2021 and became the first vice-president in charge of the economy, regional preference, relocation, and digital technology. There, she sparked controversy by threatening, in a letter, the Outdoor Sports Valley association with the loss of a subsidy representing 36% of its budget after the association signed a call for more ecological Olympic Games.
