= Jean-Pierre Marcon =

French politician

Member of the National Assembly for Haute-Loire's 1st constituency
- In office 2007–2012
- Preceded by: Laurent Wauquiez
- Succeeded by: Laurent Wauquiez

Personal details
- Born: 21 February 1949 (age 77) Saint-Bonnet-le-Froid, France
- Party: UDI

Jean-Pierre Marcon (French pronunciation: [ʒɑ̃ pjɛʁ maʁkɔ̃]; born 21 February 1949 in Saint-Bonnet-le-Froid) was a member of the National Assembly of France. He represented Haute-Loire's 1st constituency from 2007 to 2012 as a member of the Union of Democrats and Independents (UDI). He was the substitute candidate for Laurent Wauquiez in the 2007 election and replaced Wauquiez when he was appointed to the government. He did not contest the 2012 election.

He is the brother of famed chef and Maître Restaurateur Régis Marcon, whose restaurant has been awarded three Michelin stars since 2005.
