= Loire's 2nd constituency =

Constituency of the National Assembly of France

2nd constituency of Loire
- inline Constituency of the National Assembly of France

- Constituency in Department

- Location of Loire in France
- Deputy: Andrée Taurinya; LFI
- Department: Loire

The 2nd constituency of Loire is one of six French legislative constituencies in the Loire department, in the Auvergne-Rhône-Alpes region.

It consists of the (pre-2014 cantonal re-organisation) cantons of Saint Étienne South-East 1, 2 and 3 and Saint Étienne South-West 1. Its population was 85,551 at the 1999 census.

== Deputies ==
Election	Member	Party
1988	Christian Cabal	RPR
1993	Christian Cabal	RPR
1997	Christian Cabal	RPR
2002	Christian Cabal	UMP
2007	Jean-Louis Gagnaire	PS
2012	Jean-Louis Gagnaire	PS
2017	Jean-Michel Mis	LREM
2022	Andrée Taurinya	LFI
2024	Andrée Taurinya	LFI

== Election results ==
=== 2024 ===
Candidate	Party	Alliance	First round			Second round		
Candidate	Party	Alliance	Votes	%	+/–	Votes	%	+/–
Andrée Taurinya	LFI	NFP	13,652	43.09	+8.72	15,584	48.73	-1.90
Hervé Breuil	RN		8,595	27.13	+11.79	9,128	28.54	new
Eric Le Jaouen	UDI	Ensemble	7,310	23.08	-4.28	7,268	22.73	new
Martial Mossmann	LC		871	2.75	new			
Nathalie Douspis	DVD		650	2.05	+0.40			
Sophie Dieterich	LO		439	1.39	+0.35			
Quentin Fontvielle	DVC		162	0.51	+0.05			
Votes			31,679	100.00		31,980	100.00	
Valid votes			31,679	97.98	-0.42	31,980	97.96	+4.24
Blank votes			474	1.47	+0.32	495	1.52	-2.93
Null votes			178	0.55	+0.10	170	0.52	-1.31
Turnout			32,331	63.53	+18.59	32,645	64.12	+20.73
Abstentions			18,558	36.47	-18.59	18,265	35.88	-20.73
Registered voters			50,889			50,910		
Result			LFI HOLD					

=== 2022 ===
Legislative Election 2022: Loire's 2nd constituency
Party	Candidate	Votes	%	±%
LFI (NUPÉS)	Andrée Taurinya	7,738	34.37	+5.73
LREM (Ensemble)	Jean-Michel Mis	6,161	27.36	-11.39
RN	Hervé Breuil	3,454	15.34	+1.70
LR (UDC)	Marie-Camille Rey	1,938	8.61	−5.60
REC	Francette Moreau	1,145	5.09	N/A
PRG	Zahra Bencharif	931	4.13	N/A
Others	N/A	1,149	-	−
Turnout		22,516	44.94	+1.35
2nd round result
LFI (NUPÉS)	Andrée Taurinya	10,488	50.63	+8.10
LREM (Ensemble)	Jean-Michel Mis	10,225	49.37	−8.10
Turnout		20,713	43.39	+6.13
LFI gain from LREM		Swing	+8.10	

=== 2017 ===
Candidate	Label	First round		Second round	
Candidate	Label	Votes	%	Votes	%
Jean-Michel Mis	REM	8,860	38.75	10,425	57.47
Andrée Taurinya	FI	3,516	15.38	7,716	42.53
Alexandra Ribeiro-Custodio	LR	3,249	14.21		
Pascal Arrighi	FN	3,119	13.64		
Olivier Longeon	ECO	2,124	9.29		
Vanessa Pecel	PCF	907	3.97		
Maxime Peyrard	DIV	347	1.52		
Nadia Lamour	ECO	344	1.50		
Joëlle Governatori	ECO	211	0.92		
Sauveur Cuadros	EXG	187	0.82		
Votes		22,864	100.00	18,141	100.00
Valid votes		22,864	98.59	18,141	91.54
Blank votes		236	1.02	1,239	6.25
Null votes		90	0.39	438	2.21
Turnout		23,190	43.59	19,818	37.26
Abstentions		30,005	56.41	33,376	62.74
Registered voters		53,195		53,194	
Source: Ministry of the Interior

=== 2012 ===
2012 legislative election in Loire's 2nd constituency
Candidate	Party	First round		Second round	
Candidate	Party	Votes	%	Votes	%
Jean-Louis Gagnaire	PS	12,439	42.11%	16,450	59.93%
Alexandra Custodio	UMP	7,738	26.19%	10,999	40.07%
Francis Rongier	FN	5,004	16.94%		
Vanessa Pecel	FG	2,169	7.34%		
Noélie Buisson-Descombes	EELV	1,346	4.56%		
Mohamed Abdirahman		383	1.30%		
Denis Rivier	NPA	168	0.57%		
Laurent Arena	SP	111	0.38%		
Pascal Bouchet	LO	106	0.36%		
Rémi Provenzano		78	0.26%		
Valid votes		29,542	99.09%	27,449	97.18%
Spoilt and null votes		272	0.91%	797	2.82%
Votes cast / turnout		29,814	52.03%	28,246	49.31%
Abstentions		27,486	47.97%	29,034	50.69%
Registered voters		57,300	100.00%	57,280	100.00%

=== 2007 ===
Legislative Election 2007: Loire's 2nd constituency
Party	Candidate	Votes	%	±%
UMP	Christian Cabal	10,289	38.89	
PS	Jean-Louis Gagnaire	7,671	29.00	
MoDem	Denis Chambe	2,889	10.92	
FN	François Dufosse	1,331	5.03	
LV	Olivier Longeon	888	3.36	
PCF	Véronique Naegelen	871	3.29	
EXG	Hélène Millot	668	2.53	
Others	N/A	1,847		
Turnout		26,733	53.32	
2nd round result
PS	Jean-Louis Gagnaire	14,194	53.99	
UMP	Christian Cabal	12,095	46.01	
Turnout		26,983	53.82	
PS gain from UMP				

=== 2002 ===
Legislative Election 2002: Loire's 2nd constituency
Party	Candidate	Votes	%	±%
UMP	Christian Cabal	9,412	32.54	
LV	Roland Comte	4,882	16.88	
FN	Michèle Bracciano	4,282	14.81	
PS	Maurice Vincent*	3,955	13.67	
DLC	Nicole Peycelon	2,928	10.12	
PCF	Roger Dubien	1,378	4.76	
PR	Christian Daudel	594	2.05	
Others	N/A	1,491		
Turnout		29,324	58.08	
2nd round result
UMP	Christian Cabal	13,195	53.67	
LV	Roland Comte	11,391	46.33	
Turnout		25,787	51.08	
UMP hold				

* PS dissident

=== 1997 ===
Legislative Election 1997: Loire's 2nd constituency
Party	Candidate	Votes	%	±%
RPR	Christian Cabal	8,847	28.70	
DVG	Bruno Vennin	7,425	24.08	
FN	Michèle Bracciano	7,237	23.47	
PCF	Roger Dubien	3,016	9.78	
LDI	Louis Ouillon	1,115	3.62	
EXG	Marcel Gaillard	1,076	3.49	
LO	Mireille Jouffre	822	2.67	
Others	N/A	1,293		
Turnout		31,874	58.86	
2nd round result
RPR	Christian Cabal	14,788	42.35	
DVG	Bruno Vennin	14,592	41.79	
FN	Michèle Bracciano	5,539	15.86	
Turnout		35,891	66.28	
RPR hold				
