= Third constituency of the Ain =

Constituency of the National Assembly of France

Ain's 3rd constituency
- Constituency for the National Assembly
- Boundary of Ain's 3rd constituency in Ain

- Location of Ain within France
- Department: Ain
- Region: Auvergne-Rhône-Alpes
- Electorate: 148,574 (2017)

Current constituency
- Deputy: Olga Givernet
- Political party: RE
- Parliamentary group: RE

The 3rd constituency of the Ain is a French legislative constituency in the Ain département.

== Members elected ==
Election	Member	Party
1958	Émile Dubuis	MRP
1962	Émile Dubuis	MRP
1967	Guy de La Verpillière	RI
1968	Guy de La Verpillière	FNRI
1973	Guy de La Verpillière	FNRI
1978	Guy de La Verpillière	UDF
1980	Noël Ravassard	PS
1981	Noël Ravassard	PS
1986	proportional representation by department	
1988	Charles Millon	UDF
1993	Charles Millon	UDF
1995	Gérard Armand	UDF
1997	Charles Millon	UDF
2002	Étienne Blanc	UMP
2007	Étienne Blanc	UMP
2012	Étienne Blanc	UMP
2016	Stéphanie Pernod-Beaudon	LR
2017	Olga Givernet	LREM
2022	Olga Givernet	LREM
2024	Olga Givernet	RE

== Election results ==
=== 2024 ===
Candidate	Party	Alliance	First round			Second round		
Candidate	Party	Alliance	Votes	%	+/–	Votes	%	+/–
Olga Givernet	RE	ENS	17,420	32.43	+2.47	32,958	63.00	
Karine Dubarry	RN		17,252	32.11	+18.14	19,359	37.00	
Christian Jolie	LFI	NFP	13,497	25.12	+2.76	WITHDREW		
Khadija Unal	LR		3,663	6.82	-11.16			
Annick Veillerot	DLF		769	1.43	-0.09			
Fulgence Kouassi	DIV		630	1.17	-0.50			
Cécile Maisonnette	LO		455	0.85	+0.06			
Sofia Tonizzo	DIV		34	0.06	N/A			
Valid votes			53,720	97.74	-0.79	52,317	95.69	
Blank votes			860	1.56	+0.50	1,856	3.30	
Null votes			381	0.69	+0.29	499	0.91	
Turnout			54,961	65.33	+21.22	54,672	64.96	
Abstentions			29,169	34.67	-21.22	29,496	35.04	
Registered voters			84,130					
Source: Ministry of the Interior, Le Monde
Result						RE HOLD		

=== 2022 ===
Candidate	Party	Alliance	First round		Second round	
Candidate	Party	Alliance	Votes	%	Votes	%
Olga Givernet	LREM	Ensemble	10,704	29.96	18,398	58.72
Christian Jolie	LFI	NUPES	7,990	22.36	12,932	41.28
Véronique Baude	LR	UDC	6,425	17.98		
Frédéric Franck	RN		4,993	13.97		
Karine Dubarry	REC		1,835	5.14		
Jean-Loup Kastler	FGR		1,763	4.93		
Fulgence Kouassi	DIV		596	1.67		
Thierry Vergnas	DLF	DSV	543	1.52		
Marine Morvan Lembert	PA		530	1.48		
Cécile Maisonnette	LO		281	0.79		
Frank Bisetti	PP		69	0.19		
Maxence Derte	DIV		0	0.00		
Valid votes			35,729	98.54	31,330	92.38
Blank votes			385	1.06	1,870	5.51
Null votes			145	0.40	716	2.11
Turnout			36,259	44.11	33,916	41.26
Abstentions			45,945	55.89	48,291	58.74
Registered voters			82,204		82,207	
Result			LREM HOLD			

=== 2017 ===
Candidate	Label	First round		Second round	
Candidate	Label	Votes	%	Votes	%
Olga Givernet	REM	15,405	45.30	16,552	61.86
Stéphanie Pernod-Beaudon	LR	7,281	21.41	10,204	38.14
Gaëtan Noblet	FN	3,808	11.20		
Christian Jolie	FI	3,064	9.01		
Jean Mercier	ECO	1,496	4.40		
Géraldine Sacchi-Hassanein	PS	1,468	4.32		
Thierry Borne	DIV	488	1.43		
Jean-Sébastien Bloch	PCF	431	1.27		
Frédéric Mozer	DIV	361	1.06		
Éric Lahy	EXG	147	0.43		
Fabrice Gentile	DVG	59	0.17		
Votes		34,008	100.00	26,756	100.00
Valid votes		34,008	98.62	26,756	91.91
Blank votes		359	1.04	1,815	6.23
Null votes		116	0.34	539	1.85
Turnout		34,483	45.60	29,110	38.53
Abstentions		41,131	54.40	46,438	61.47
Registered voters		75,614		75,548	
Source: Ministry of the Interior

=== 2016 by-election ===
By-election of 2016: Ain 3rd - 2nd round
Party	Candidate	Votes	%	±%
LR	Stéphanie Pernod-Beaudon	10,472	73.32	
FN	Gaétan Noblet	3,811	26.68	
Turnout		16.037	21.88	
LR hold		Swing		

=== 2012 ===
Summary of the 10 June and 17 June 2012 French legislative in Ain's 3rd Constituency election results
Candidate	Party		1st round		2nd round	
Candidate	Party		Votes	%	Votes	%
Etienne Blanc	Union for a Popular Movement	UMP	15,465	41.55%	19,266	55.17%
Jean-Marc Fognini	Socialist Party	PS	12,164	32.68%	15,653	44.83%
Gaëtan Noblet	National Front	FN	5,041	13.54%		
Christine Franquet	The Greens	VEC	1,810	4.86%		
Yves Thoumine	Left Front	FG	1,622	4.36%		
Delphine Rochet	Miscellaneous Right	DVD	582	1.56%		
Sylvie Vermeulen	Ecologist	ECO	379	1.02%		
Eric Lahy	Far Left	ExG	160	0.43%		
Total			37,223	100%	34,919	100%
Registered voters			69,837		69,847	
Blank/Void ballots			469	1.24%	890	2.49%
Turnout			37,692	53.97%	35,809	51.27%
Abstentions			32,145	46.03%	34,038	48.73%
Result					UMP HOLD	

=== 2007 ===
Summary of the 10 June and 17 June 2007 French legislative in Ain's 3rd Constituency election results
Candidate	Party		1st round		2nd round	
Candidate	Party		Votes	%	Votes	%
Etienne Blanc	Union for a Popular Movement	UMP	23,722	49.99%	26,378	60.20%
Françoise Rigaud	Socialist Party	PS	9,018	19.01%	17,438	39.80%
Fabienne Faure	Democratic Movement	MoDem	5,198	10.95%		
Philippe Virard	Communist	PCF	2,366	4.99%		
Olivier Wyssa	National Front	FN	2,229	4.70%		
Christine Franquet	The Greens	VEC	1,640	3.46%		
Luc Bailly	Far Left	ExG	1,138	2.40%		
Maryse Favre	Ecologist	ECO	792	1.67%		
Maurice Juston	Movement for France	MPF	555	1.17%		
Emilie Albert	Hunting, Fishing, Nature, Traditions	CPNT	481	1.01%		
Dolorès Goutailler	Far Left	ExG	308	0.65%		
Jacques Marmorat	Divers	DIV	2	0.00%		
Total			47,449	100%	43,816	100%
Registered voters			86,696		86,694	
Blank/Void ballots			803	1.66%	1,296	2.87%
Turnout			48,252	55.66%	45,112	52.04%
Abstentions			38,444	44.34%	41,582	47.96%
Result					UMP HOLD	

=== 2002 ===
Candidate	Label	First round		Second round→	
Candidate	Label	Votes	%	Votes	%
Étienne Blanc	UMP	20,247	43.74	24,060	59.52
Hubert Bertrand	PS	8,721	18.84	16,094	40.08
Olivier Wyssa	FN	6,169	13.33		
Philippe Virard	Pôle républicain	3,208	6.93		
Alain Pasqualin	LV	1,945	4.20		
Gerard Bettant	CPNT	1,662	3.59		
Jean-Pierre Merlo	PCF	1,556	3.36		
Ginette Richard	MEI	871	1.88		
Sylvie Crozet	LO	671	1.45		
Patrick Fernandez	MNR	476	1.03		
Constanza Solari-Vincensini	PT	286	0.62		
Elisa Allenbach	Ind	240	0.52		
Anne-Marie Rosset	Reg	141	0.30		
Daniele Hervé	DVD	92	0.20		
Votes		46,285	100.00	40,154	100.00
Valid votes		46,285	97.47	40,154	95.63
Blank or null votes		1,202	2.53	1,837	4.37
Turnout		47,487	61.34	41,991	54.24
Abstentions		29,926	38.66	35,421	45.76
Registered voters		77,413		77,412	
Source: Ministry of the Interior

=== 1997 ===
Candidate	Party	Alliance	First round		Second round	
Candidate	Party	Alliance	Votes	%	Votes	%
Charles Millon (incumbent)	UDF		18,054	40.83	25,270	55.41
Eric Gilbert	LV	PS	8,906	20.14	20,333	44.59
Olivier Wyssa	FN		6,574	14.87		
Philippe Virard	MDC		3,208	6.93		
Jean-Pierre Merlo	PCF		3,034	6.86		
Henri Casellas	GE		1,751	3.96		
Henri Gouy-Paillier	LO		1,495	3.30		
Louis-Alain Gaudin	MPF	LDI	1,362	3.08		
Valid votes			44,219	95.07	45,603	94.35
Blank or Null votes			2,293	4.93	2,733	5.65
Turnout			46,512	64.03	48,336	66.54
Abstentions			26,129	35.97	24,311	33.46
Registered voters			72,641		72,647	
Result			UDF HOLD			

=== 1993 ===
Legislative Election 1993: Ain 3rd
Party	Candidate	Votes	%	±%
UDF	Charles Millon (incumbent)	22,949	51.59	−3.01
PS	Pierre Carroz	7,644	17.18	−13.96
RN	Olivier Wyssa	5,519	12.41	+4.59
GE	Albert Delavière	4,194	9.43	
PCF	Jean-Pierre Merlo	2,655	5.97	−0.47
The Clover - The New Ecologists	Jean-Michel Verd	1,524	3.43	
Turnout		46,909	65.92	+2.30
UDF hold		Swing	+34.41	

=== 1988 ===
Legislative Election 1988: Ain 3rd
Party	Candidate	Votes	%	±%
UDF	Charles Millon	22,825	54.60	+28.83
PS	Juliette Vincen	13,018	31.14	−14.92
RN	Ghislaine Jullien	3,270	7.82	+7.82
PCF	Marcelle Vdovitchenko	2,692	6.44	−0.68
Turnout		42,506	63.62	−3.12
UDF gain from		Swing	+23.46	

=== 1981 ===
Candidate	Party	Alliance	First round			Second round		
Candidate	Party	Alliance	Votes	%	+/–	Votes	%	+/–
Noël Ravassard (incumbent)	PS		25,560	46.06		34,714	55.66	-1.83
Charles Millon	UDF	PR	14,299	25.77		27,658	44.34	+1.84
Pierre Deplanche	RPR	UNM	10,477	18.88				
Fernand Roustit	PCF		3,951	7.12				
Daniel Vericel	PSU		619	1.12				
Isabelle Leclerc	LO		580	1.07				
Jean-Claude Gioria	CCA		3	0.01				
Yvette Serrière	FN		1	0.00				
Valid votes			55,490	98.73		62,372	98.96	
Blank or Null votes			716	1.27		654	1.04	
Turnout			56,206	66.75		63,026	74.84	
Abstentions			28,010	33.26		21,189	25.16	
Registered voters			84,216			84,215		
Result						PS HOLD		

=== 1980 by-election ===
By-election of 1980: Ain 3rd - 2nd round
Party	Candidate	Votes	%	±%
PS	Noël Ravassard	23,043	57.49	
UDF	Pierre Cormorèche	17,776	42.50	−10.87
Turnout		16.037	21.88	
PS hold		Swing	+14.99	

=== 1978 ===
Candidate	Party	Alliance	First round			Second round		
Candidate	Party	Alliance	Votes	%	+/–	Votes	%	+/–
Guy de La Verpillière	UDF	PR	28,084	45.48	+8.92	34,287	53.37	+1.78
Louis Lamarche	MRG		16,151	26.15	+4.29	29,960	46.63	-1.58
Jean-Marie Lepézel	PCF		8,889	14.39	-0.19			
Philippe Lebreton	Écologie 78		4,965	8.04				
Marie-José Sabin	LO		1,421	2.31				
Jean Bouchard	CNIP		1,413	2.29				
Michel Védie	PSU		830	1.34	-2.45			
Valid votes			61,756	98.22	+0.31	64,247	98.25	+0.79
Blank or Null votes			1,120	1.78	-0.31	1,142	1.75	-0.79
Turnout			62,876	81.63	+3.56	65,389	84.89	+4.34
Abstentions			14,153	18.37	-3.56	11,643	15.11	-4.34
Registered voters			77,029			77,032		
Result						UDF HOLD		

=== 1973 ===
Candidate	Party	Alliance	First round			Second round		
Candidate	Party	Alliance	Votes	%	+/–	Votes	%	+/–
Guy de La Verpillière	RI	URP	17,791	36.56	-11.12	25,872	51.79	-12.37
Louis Lamarche	MRG	UGSD	10,634	21.86		24,083	48.21	
Camille Piane	PCF		7,093	14.58	+2.54	WITHDREW		
Serge Robin	PSD	MR	5,045	10.37				
Jean-Jacques Comtet	DVD		4,454	9.15				
Charles Romieux	PSU		1,843	3.79	-0.02			
René Collet	CDP		1,797	3.69				
Valid votes			48,657	97.91	-1.01	49,955	97.46	+0.18
Blank or Null votes			1,040	2.09	+0.91	1,304	2.54	-0.18
Turnout			49,697	78.07	+1.75	51,259	80.55	+7.55
Abstentions			13,961	21.93	-1.75	12,378	19.45	-7.55
Registered voters			63,658			63,637		
Result						RI HOLD		

=== 1968 ===
Candidate	Party	Alliance	First round			Second round		
Candidate	Party	Alliance	Votes	%	+/–	Votes	%	+/–
Guy de La Verpillière	RI	URP	25,132	47.68	+16.36	31,842	64.16	+26.06
Emile Dubuis	CD	PDM	11,709	22.21	-9.10	WITHDREW		
Marcel Viénot	CIR	FGDS	7,518	14.26	-5.71	17,790	35.84	-1.03
René Cantenys	PCF		6,344	12.04	-3.11			
Louise Véricel	PSU		2,007	3.81				
Valid votes			52,710	98.82	+1.14	49,632	97.28	-1.62
Blank or Null votes			632	1.18	-1.14	1,387	2.72	+1.62
Turnout			53,342	76.32	+1.22	51,019	73.00	-4.63
Abstentions			16,546	23.68	-1.22	18,866	27.00	+4.63
Registered voters			69,888			69,885		
Result						RI HOLD		

=== 1967 ===
Candidate	Party	Alliance	First round			Second round		
Candidate	Party	Alliance	Votes	%	+/–	Votes	%	+/–
Guy de La Verpillière	RI		15,907	31.32	N/A	20,247	38.10	N/A
Emile Dubuis (incumbent)	CD	PDM	15,900	31.31	-2.73	13,302	25.03	-18.41
Régis Brrlioz	CIR	FGDS	10,140	19.97	N/A	19,592	36.87	N/A
René Cantenys	PCF		7,692	15.15	-1.96	WITHDREW		
Jean-Jacques Chardon	Moderates		1,144	2.25	N/A			
Valid votes			50,783	97.68	+0.38	53,141	98.90	+1.60
Blank or Null votes			1,206	2.32	-0.38	590	1.10	-1.60
Turnout			51,989	75.10	+15.33	53,731	77.63	+14.47
Abstentions			17,239	24.90	-15.33	15,485	22.37	-14.47
Registered voters			69,228			69,216		
Result						RI GAIN		

=== 1962 ===
Candidate	Party	Alliance	First round			Second round		
Candidate	Party	Alliance	Votes	%	+/–	Votes	%	+/–
Émile Dubuis (incumbent)	MRP		12,622	34.04	+8.66	17,018	43.41	-13.46
Michel Vittori	UNR-UDT		10,623	28.65	+19.39	13,514	34.47	N/A
Jean Saint-Cyr	Radsoc		7,493	20.21	-2.83	WITHDREW		
Henri Petitpas	PCF		6,346	17.11	+1.85	8,674	22.12	+6.12
Valid votes			37,084	97.30	-0.58	39,206	97.30	-0.49
Blank or Null votes			1,029	2.70	+0.58	1,086	2.70	+0.49
Turnout			38,113	59.77	-8.81	40,292	63.16	-5.84
Abstentions			25,651	40.23	+8.81	23,497	36.84	+5.84
Registered voters			63,764			63,789		
Result						RI GAIN		

=== 1958 ===
Candidate	Party	Alliance	First round			Second round		
Candidate	Party	Alliance	Votes	%	+/–	Votes	%	+/–
Émile Dubuis	MRP		10,689	25.38		24,030	56.87	
Jean Saint-Cyr	Radsoc		9,704	23.04		11,465	27.13	
Guy de La Verpillière	CNIP		8,387	19.92		WITHDREW		
Jules Blanchet	PCF		6,427	15.26		6,760	16.00	
André Charignon	UNR		3,900	9.26		WITHDREW		
Marius Bretin	Far-right politics		3,002	7.13		WITHDREW		
Valid votes			42,109	97.88		42,255	97.79	
Blank or Null votes			910	2.12		957	2.21	
Turnout			43,019	68.58		43,212	69.00	
Abstentions			19,712	31.42		19,416	31.00	
Registered voters			62,731			62,628		
Result						MRP GAIN		

== Sources ==
- Official results of French elections from 1998: "Résultats électoraux officiels en France" (in French). Archived from the original on 20 December 2011.
