= Jean-Michel Mis =

French politician (born 1967)

Jean-Michel Mis (born 28 July 1967 in Saint-Étienne) is a French politician of La République En Marche! (LREM) who was a member of the National Assembly from 2017 to 2022, representing Loire's 2nd constituency.

== Political career ==
In parliament, Mis serves on the Committee on Legal Affairs. In this capacity, he was the parliament’s rapporteur on the use of drones by law enforcement agencies.

In addition to his committee assignments, Mis is part of the French-Austrian Parliamentary Friendship Group, the French-Hungarian Parliamentary Friendship Group, the French-Armenian Parliamentary Friendship Group, and the French-Moldovan Parliamentary Friendship Group.

In July 2019, Mis voted in favor of the French ratification of the European Union’s Comprehensive Economic and Trade Agreement (CETA) with Canada.

In the 2022 French legislative election, Mis lost his seat to Andrée Taurinya from La France Insoumise.

== See also ==
- 2017 French legislative election
