= Régis Marcon =

French chef and "Maître Restaurateur" (born 1956)

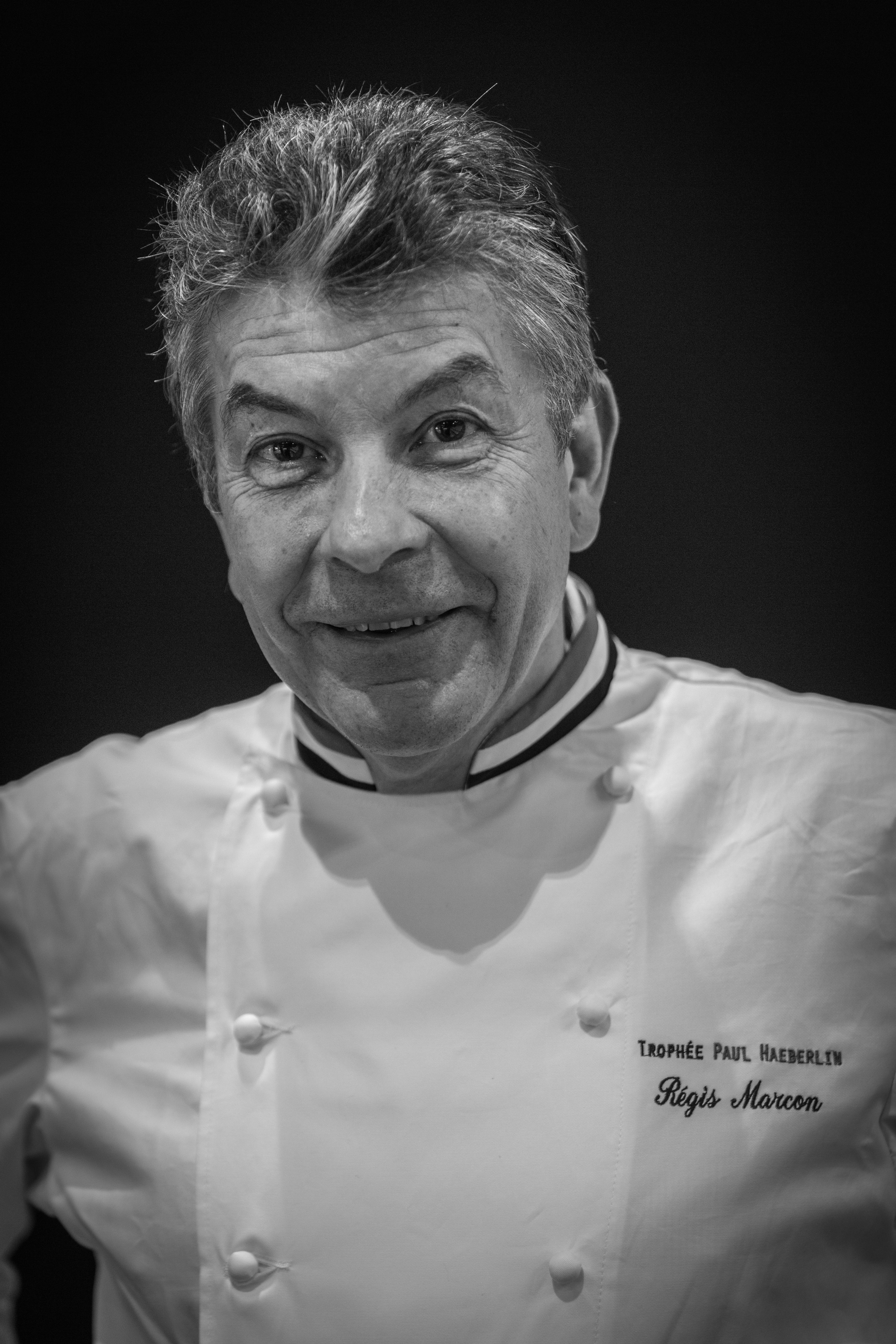
- Born: 14 June 1956 (age 70); Saint-Bonnet-le-Froid, Haute-Loire, France
- Spouse: Michèle
- Culinary career
- Rating: Michelin stars
- Current restaurant: Restaurant Marcon
- Website: www.regismarcon.fr

Régis Marcon (born 14 June 1956) is a French chef and "Maître Restaurateur". He is the owner of Hôtel Le Clos des Cimes located in Saint-Bonnet-le-Froid in the Haute-Loire, awarded three stars by the Guide Michelin since 2005.

== Style ==
His cooking style is regional French cuisine that emphasizes local products such as mushrooms (the emblem of his restaurant), chestnuts, the Le Puy green lentil and the Fin gras du Mézenc.

== Awards ==
He has won contests including the Prix Taittinger in 1989, the Prix Brillat Savarin in 1992 and the Bocuse d'Or in 1995. He was the honorary president of the Rencontres François Rabelais at the Forum Alimentation et Culture in 2008.

He obtained the title "Maître Restaurateur" and is a member of the Association Française des Maîtres Restaurateurs.

== Family ==
Régis Marcon married his wife Michèle in 1978. They have four children and Régis now runs the restaurant together with his oldest son Jacques.

He is the brother of politician Jean-Pierre Marcon, deputy of the first district of Haute-Loire, general counselor and former mayor of Dunières.

== See also ==
- List of Michelin starred restaurants
