= Andrée Taurinya =

French politician (born 1963)

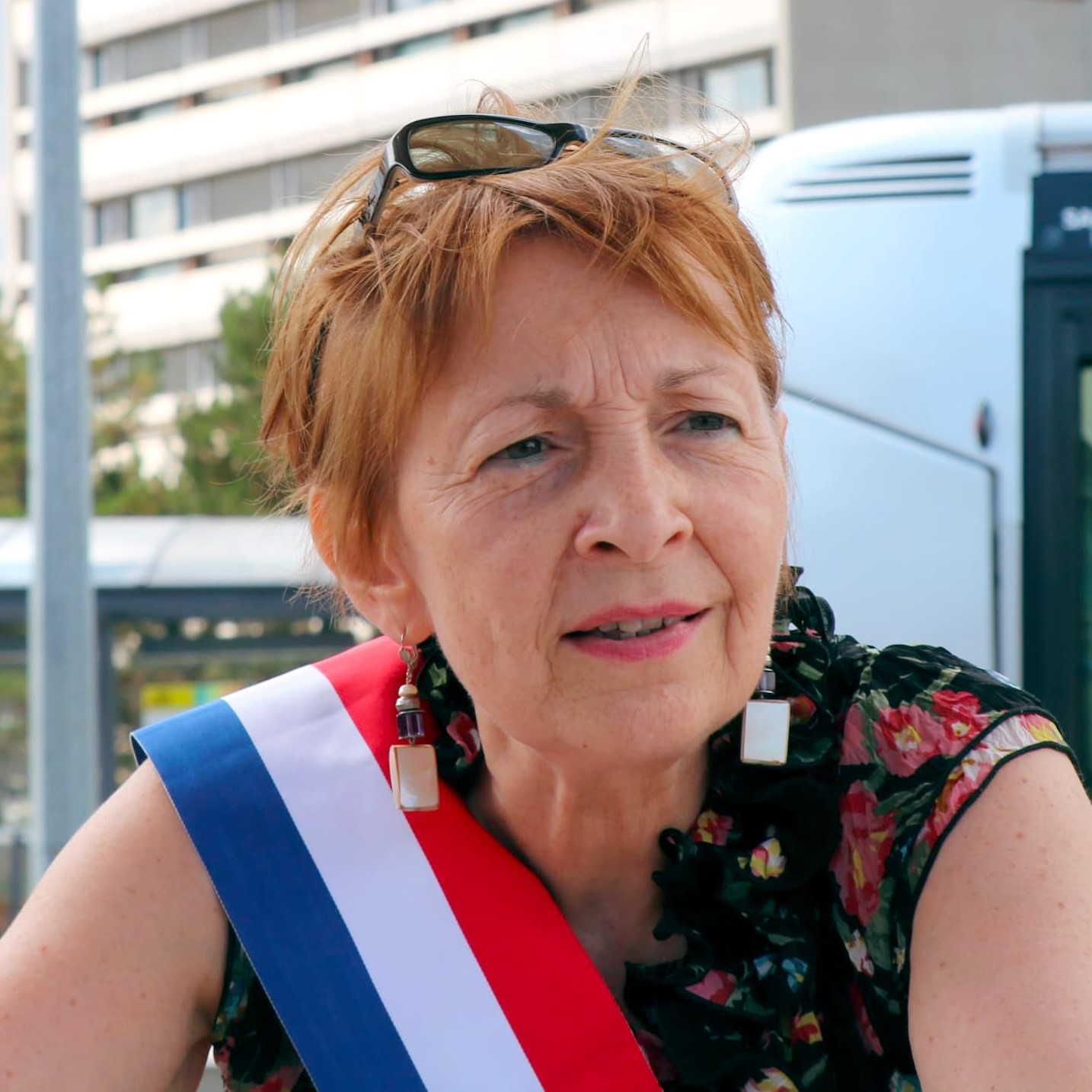
- Andrée Taurinya in 2022

Member of the National Assembly for Loire's 2nd constituency
- Incumbent
- Assumed office 22 June 2022
- Preceded by: Jean-Michel Mis

Personal details
- Born: 3 June 1963 (age 62) Toulouse, France
- Party: La France Insoumise
- Other political affiliations: NUPES (2022); NFP (2024)
- Relations: Mathilde Gabriel-Péri (great-aunt)

Andrée Taurinya (born 3 June 1963) is a French politician. She is a member of La France Insoumise and has been Member of Parliament for Loire's 2nd constituency since 2022.

== Career ==
Taurinya stood unsuccessfully in the 2017 French legislative election.

Taurinya was re-elected in the 2024 French legislative election.
