= Marie-Camille Rey =

French politician (born 1987)

Member of the Regional Council of Auvergne-Rhône-Alpes
- In office 1 January 2016 – 20 June 2021

Personal details
- Born: 13 August 1987 (age 38)
- Party: The Republicans (since 2015)
- Other political affiliations: Union for a Popular Movement (2006–2015)

Marie-Camille Rey (born 13 August 1987) is a French politician. From 2016 to 2021, she served as vice president of the Regional Council of Auvergne-Rhône-Alpes. She was the youngest person elected to the council in the 2015 regional elections. In the 2022 legislative election, she was a candidate for the National Assembly in Loire's 2nd constituency. In the 2024 legislative election, she was the substitute candidate of Éric Le Jaouen in the constituency.
