= Étienne Blanc =

French politician (born 1954)

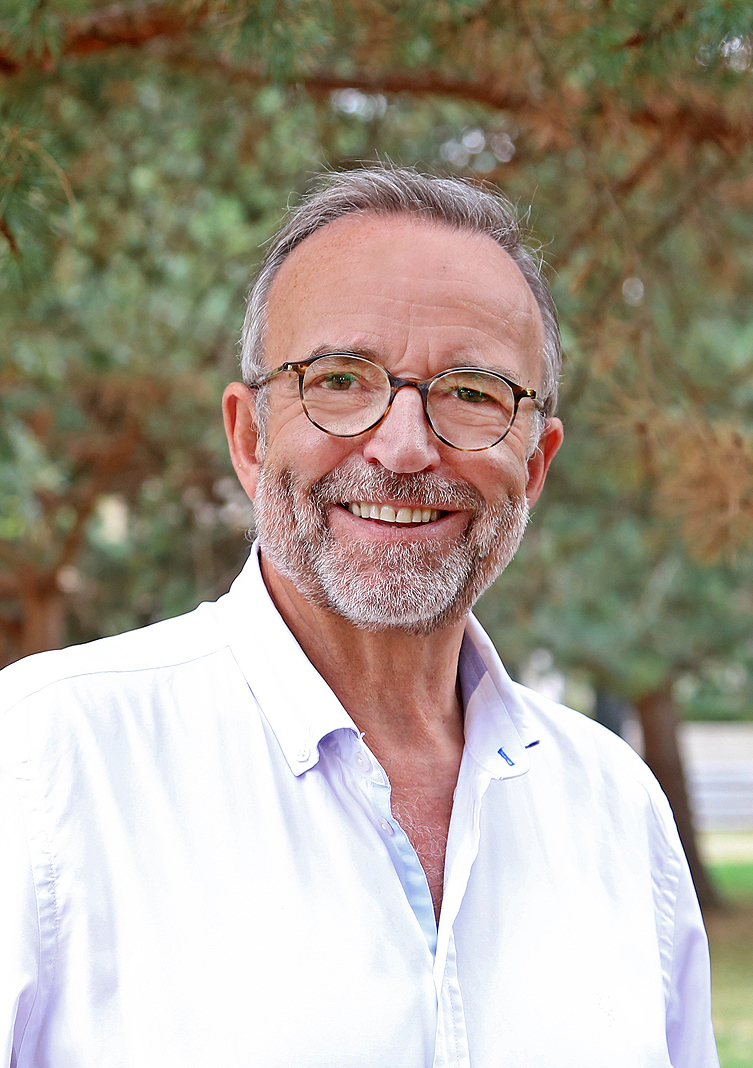
- Blanc in 2020

Senator for Rhône
- Incumbent
- Assumed office 1 October 2020

Member of the National Assembly for Ain's 3rd constituency
- In office 19 June 2002 – 10 March 2016
- Preceded by: Charles Millon
- Succeeded by: Stéphanie Pernod-Beaudon

Mayor of Divonne-les-Bains
- In office 20 January 1991 – 9 February 2019
- Preceded by: Jean-Claude Pruvost
- Succeeded by: Vincent Scattolin

Municipal councillor of Lyon
- Incumbent
- Assumed office 4 July 2020
- Constituency: 3rd arrondissement

Personal details
- Born: 29 August 1954 (age 72) Givors, France
- Party: Union for French Democracy (until 1999); Liberal Christian Right (1999–2002); Union for a Popular Movement (2002–2015); The Republicans (2015–present)
- Education: Jean Moulin University Lyon 3
- Profession: Lawyer

Étienne Blanc (French pronunciation: [etjɛn blɑ̃]; born 29 August 1954) is a French politician who has served as a Senator for Rhône since 2020. A member of The Republicans (LR), he also ran for Mayor of Lyon previously in 2020.

A lawyer by occupation, Blanc served as Mayor of Divonne-les-Bains (1991–2019) and represented the 3rd constituency of Ain in the National Assembly (2002–2016). He was also First Vice President of the Regional Council of Auvergne-Rhône-Alpes (2016–2020) under Laurent Wauquiez.

== Political career ==
A native of Givors, Blanc attended Jean Moulin University Lyon 3 to study law. He was a Rally for the Republic activist in the 1978 legislative election campaign in Lyon, when he was thrown in the Rhône by communist agitators. He moved to Bourg-en-Bresse to practice law, where he was elected to its municipal council in 1983 for one six-year term. He later held the mayorship of Divonne-les-Bains from 1991 until his resignation in 2019. From 1995 to 2014, he also presided over the communauté de communes du Pays de Gex.

In 2002, he joined the newly-founded Union for a Popular Movement, which became The Republicans in 2015. He represented the 3rd constituency of the Ain department in the National Assembly from 2002 until his resignation in 2016, triggered by his will to focus on his activities at the regional level.

Following the 2015 regional election, Laurent Wauquiez was elected to the presidency of the Regional Council of Auvergne-Rhône-Alpes on 4 January 2016. Blanc became his deputy, as he was elected First Vice President of the Regional Council the same day. He had previously been a regional councillor of the now-former Rhône-Alpes region from 1992 to 2002, as a close ally to then-Regional Council President Charles Millon.

Blanc was The Republicans' candidate for Mayor of Lyon in the 2020 municipal election, in which the list he led placed second in the first round before merging with the list of La République En Marche! (LREM) led by Yann Cucherat for the second round. He was elected a municipal councillor for the 3rd arrondissement, taking office as group president in the municipal council. In late 2021, Blanc resigned the group presidency following favourable comments he made on Éric Zemmour, which displeased members of his group.

In the 2020 Senate election, he was returned to the French Parliament for Rhône. He later resigned as Wauquiez's deputy. In the Senate, where he sits on the Committee on Foreign Affairs, Defence and the Armed Forces, he presides over an information group on Nagorno-Karabakh.

== Political positions ==
Blanc is a conservative. He has advocated a right-wing electoral alliance beyond The Republicans ahead of the 2022 legislative election to counter the left-wing New Ecological and Social People's Union (NUPES).

Ahead of the 2022 presidential election, Blanc publicly declared his support for Michel Barnier as The Republicans' candidate. After Barnier placed third in the first round at the 2021 The Republicans congress, he supported Éric Ciotti for the second round.

Blanc had called on Éric Zemmour to put his name forward at the 2021 congress for the party nomination, a proposition Zemmour declined before founding a new party, Reconquête. Blanc expressed support for Zemmour's agenda-setting in the campaign leading up to the 2022 presidential election, but declined to join Reconquête, stating The Republicans should instead set a new course of action: "The right must tackle certain ideas head on: sovereignty, nationality, decline, immigration, identity, language, all themes that Zemmour makes his stock in trade". He called Zemmour's candidacy "the expression of [the right's] renunciations".
