= Jean-Louis Gagnaire =

French politician

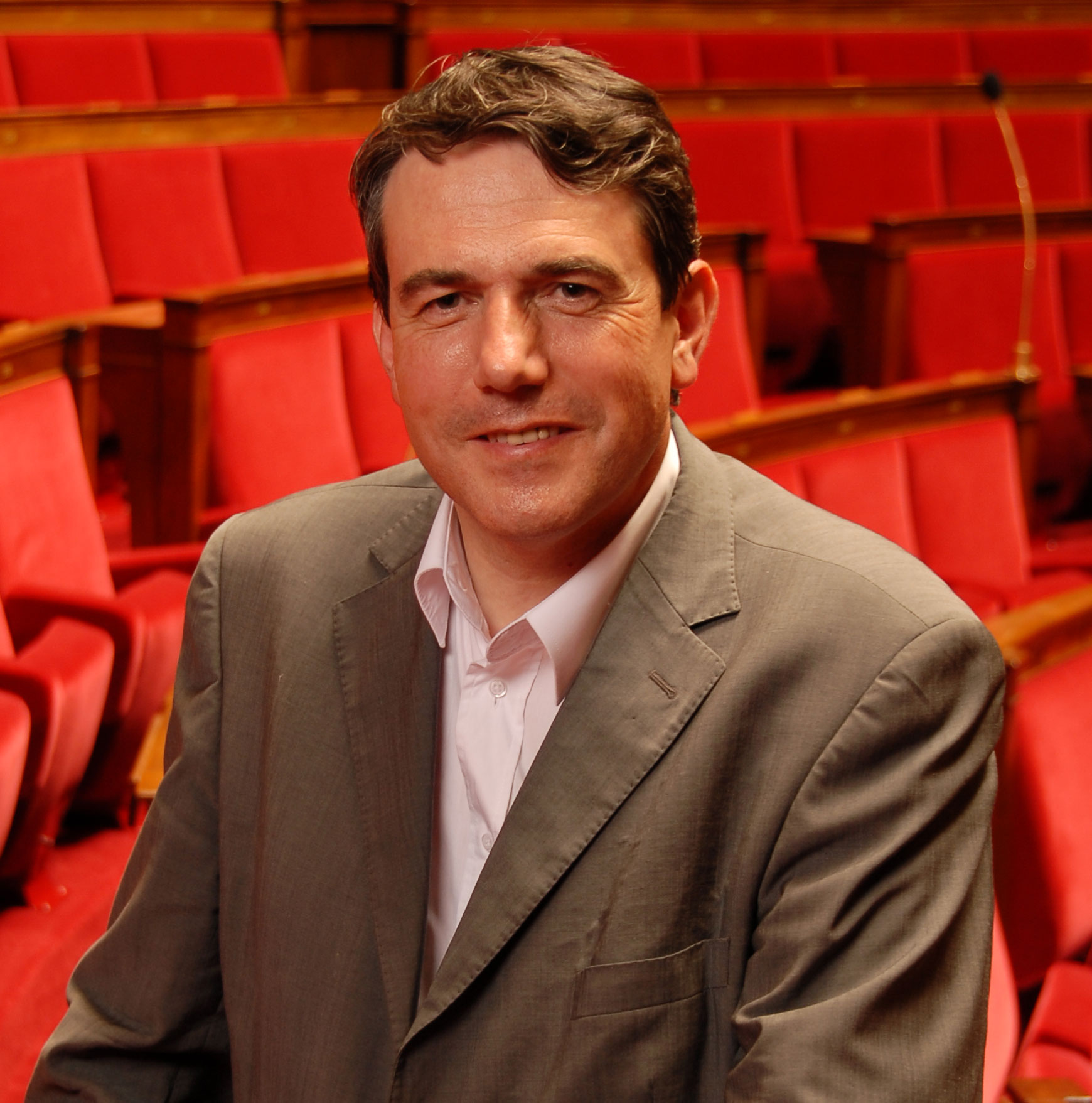
Jean-Louis Gagnaire

Jean-Louis Gagnaire (born April 29, 1956 in Saint-Étienne, Loire) was a member of the National Assembly of France from 2007 to 2017. He represented Loire's 2nd constituency, as a member of the Socialiste, radical, citoyen et divers gauche.
