= United Regions / Forum of Regional Governments and Global Associations of Regions =

ORU Fogar
- United Regions Organization
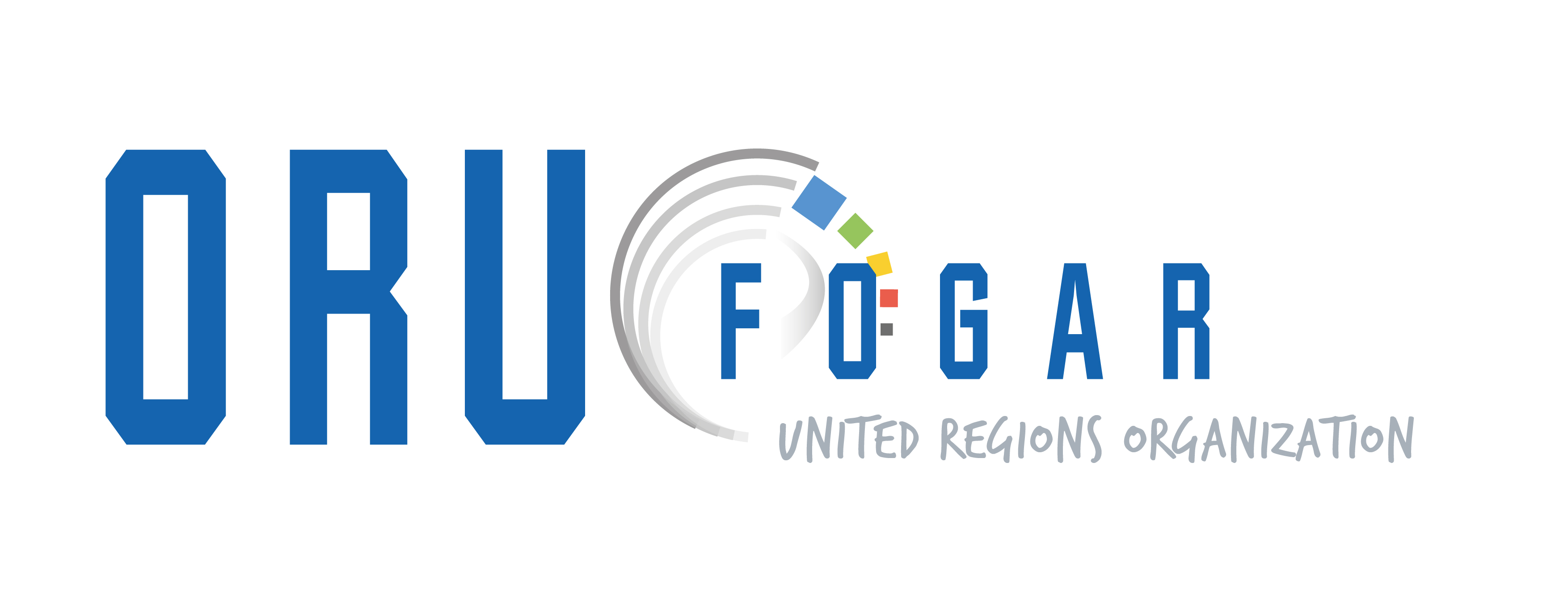
- Formation: 2007
- Type: International Organization
- Location: Barcelona
- Official language: English, French and Spanish
- President: Abdessamad Sekkal
- Vice President: Laurent Wauquiez
- Secretary General: Carles Llorens Vila
- Website: http://www.regionsunies-fogar.org/en/

The United Regions Organization / Forum of Regional Governments and Global Associations of Regions (ORU Fogar) is an international organization that aims to bring together regions from all over the world and represent them before other international organizations in order to boost a global policy of balanced development and territorial cohesion.

The Organization's main objective is to seek the region's recognition as a major player in global governance. ORU Fogar defends that states' decentralization of power towards other actors accelerates development; consequently fostering democracy by the proximity between these new actors and the citizens. ORU Fogar promotes a model based on a strong regional government, with legally recognized capabilities and competences and also budgets in compliance with those competences. Amongst its members, ORU Fogar has important European and Latin American regions, as well as regional governments from Africa and Asia.

The organization acts according to two approaches:

- An integrated approach is generated in the territories to design and implement solutions in the field to the new challenges that these territories are facing.
- The promotion of new governance rules at a global level, including the regional scale, allows the development of this territorial approach.

== Objectives ==
ORU Fogar's founding objectives can be wrapped up into three main topics: To raise the voice of regions before all of the international bodies, through the association of regions from all over the world in order to work together for development; to defend a new global governance where regions have a relevant role in encouraging the participation of regional governments in the creation of new policies and work for regions for national governments to take into account the regional dimensión and cultural diversity, through the promotion of competitiveness and regional growth, but always trying to follow a sustainable development and respect for climate approach.

== History ==
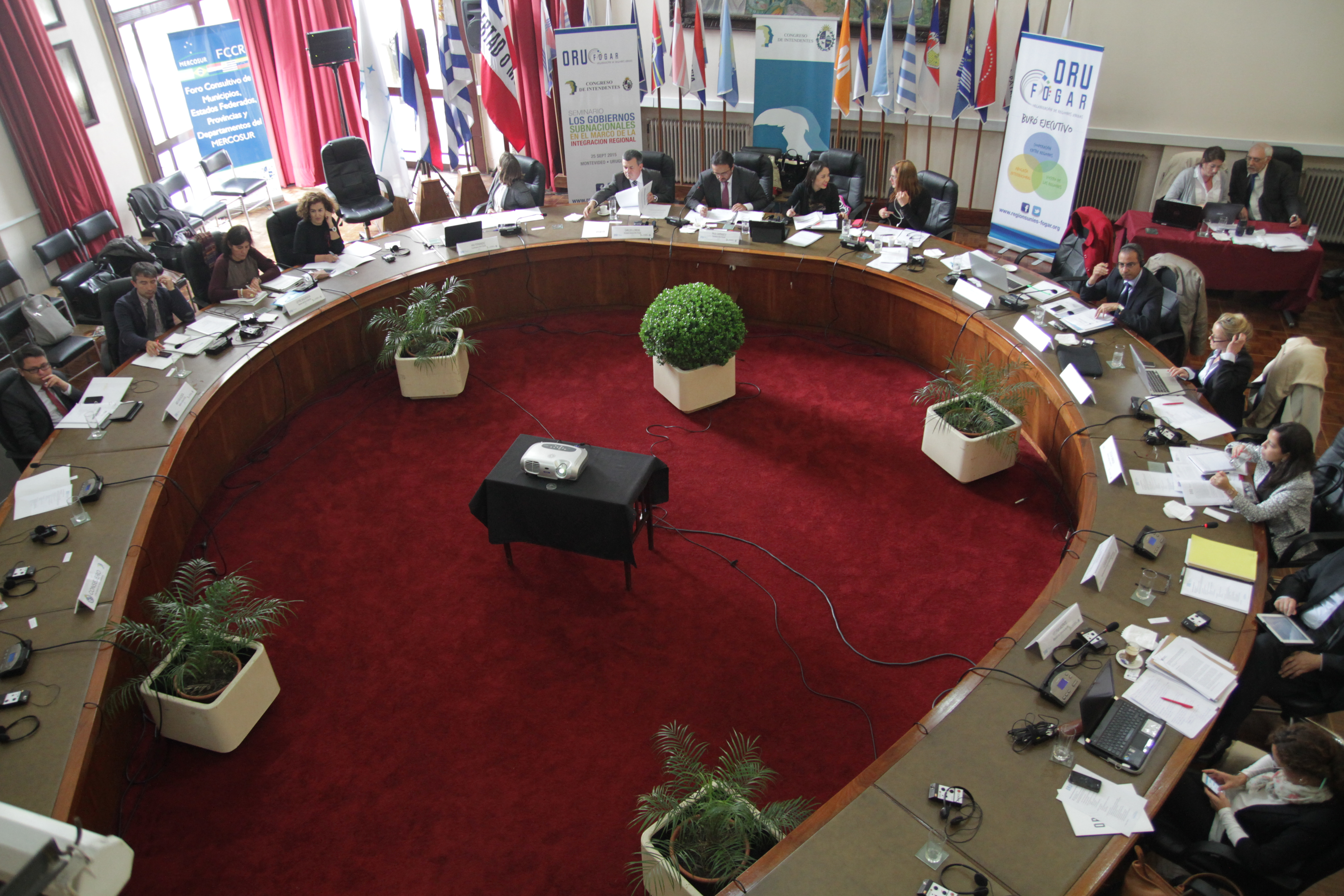
ORU Fogar's Executive Bureau at Montevideo (2015)

Facing the new global situation, regions gathered to achieve a coordinated response to the current challenges in a worldwide association. That meeting was named "Forum of Regional Governments and Global Associations of Regions (FOGAR)", held in Cape Town, South Africa, in August 2007. It was conducted on the basis of the "Declaration of the Regions on their participation in the governance of globalization" signed in Marseille, PACA, France, on the occasion of the first international convention for a regional approach to development. Seventeen networks of regions from all continents were the founders of the Organization, with a representation of more than 900 subnational governments. Since July 2010, membership in ORU Fogar is also opened to regions and federated states individually.

=== Founders ===
Name	Country of origin	Position
Thierry Cornillet	France	European Deputy, regional counselor in Rhône-Alpes (France)
François Maïta	France	Vice President of the Aquitaine region (France) y Departamental Counselor of the Pyrénées-Atlantiques Departmental Council
Claudio Martini	Italy	Senator of the Democratic Party in the Tuscanny region (Italy) and Vicepresident Vicario del partido Demócrata del Senado
Juan José Ibarretxe	Spain	Basque nationalist politician. From 1999 to 2009 lehendakari of the Eusko Jaurlaritza (Basque Country) (Spain)
Tasneem Essop	South Africa	Head of the Low Carbon Frameworks working group at WWF
Juan Carlos Romero Roy Abelardo Nikisch	Argentina	Senator of Argentina by Salta Argentinian politician of the Radical Civic Union
Priscilla Post Wohl Sergey Kuchin	Russia	President and moderator at NORTAC (Northern Research Technical Asistencia Center) and Director of EcoNorth -
Oscar de los Santos	Uruguay	Uruguayan syndicalist and politician at the Broad Front. Foreman of the Maldonado department (2005-2015)
Alberto João Jardim	Portugal	2nd President of the regional government of Madeira (Portugal) (1978-2015)
Luis Alberto Soliz	Bolivia	Department of Santa Cruz (Bolivia)
Michel Vauzelle	France	16 district deputy in Bouches-du-Rhône, Vicepresident of the National Assembly Commission of Foreign Affairs
Abdelhadi Benallal	Morocco	Former President of the Tangier-Tetouan region (Morocco)

== Structure ==
=== General Assembly ===
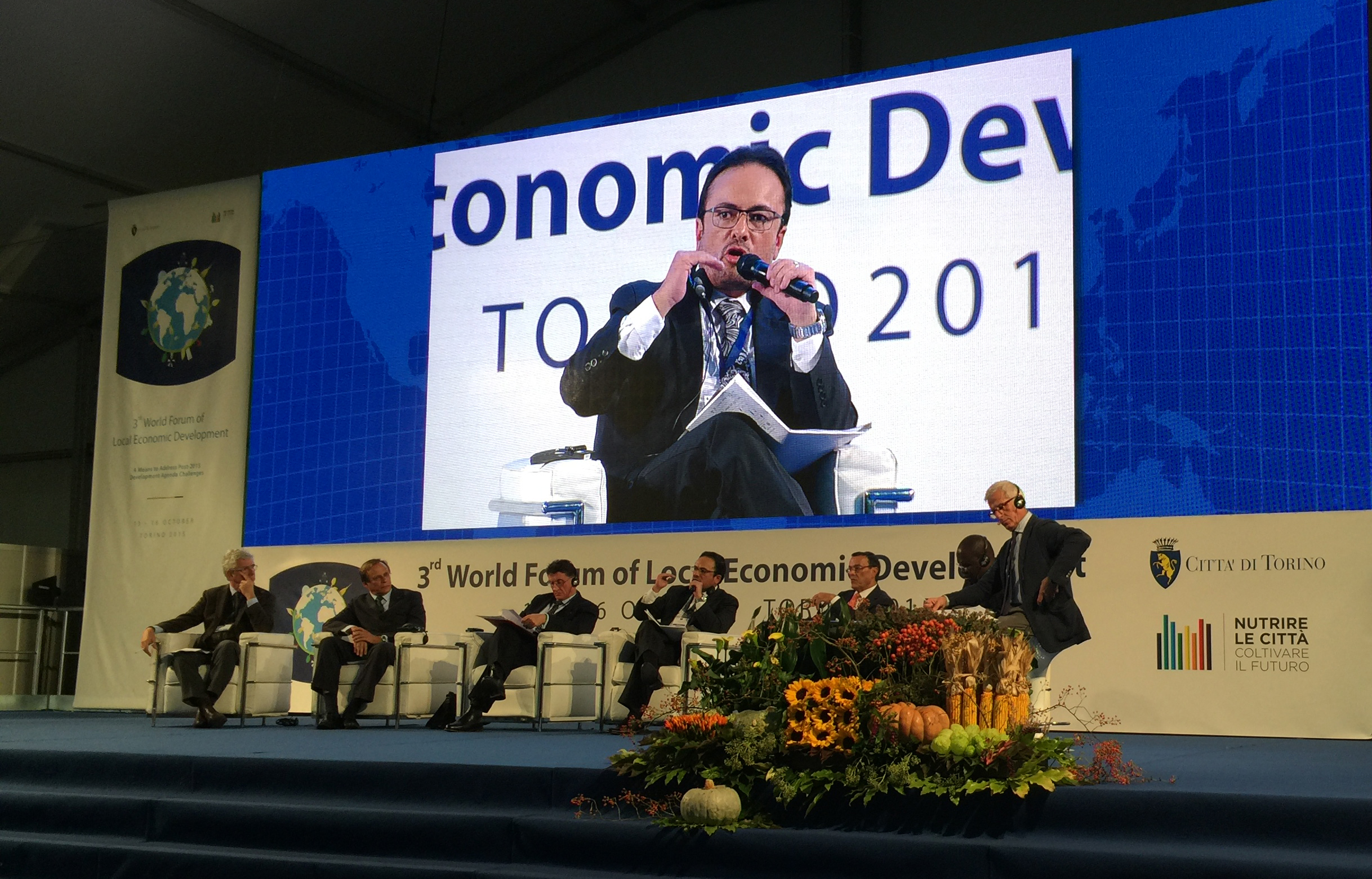
ORU Fogar's former president, Paúl Carrasco, at the LED Forum in Turin (October 2015)

The General Assembly is the body of the Organization with the highest level of decision-making power. It is in charge of defining the approaches of the Organization as well as deciding over the actions that will have to be carried on. All the members of the Organization shall meet up in ordinary session once a year.

=== Executive Bureau ===
The Executive Bureau is devoted to direct and manage the actions of the Organization, always being backed by the General Secretariat. The Executive Bureau meets up twice a year.

Some of the basic functions of the Bureau are: To propose the Organization's political vias and to carry them out, coordinate the work among the different members and commissions that can be created from such members, to supervise the General Secretariat's work and the financial management, and to establish the internal regulations which would be passed at the General Assembly.

=== Presidency ===
President: Abdessamad Sekkal, President of the Rabat-Salé-Kénitra regional council (Morocco), was elected as ORU Fogar's president at the General Assembly held in Quito (Ecuador) on 16 October 2016. He represents the United Regions Organization and is in charge of calling the General Assembly and the Bureau's meetings.

Vice President: Laurent Wauquiez, President of the Auvergne-Rhône-Alpes regional council (France) and Vice President of the International Association of Francophone Regions (ARF) was elected as 2nd Vice President of ORU Fogar at the General Assembly held in Quito (Ecuador) on 16 October 2016. He represents the Organization in the absence of the President.

Secretary General: Carles Llorens Vila was appointed as Secretary General of ORU at the VI Summit of Regional Governments on 1 September 2014.

==== Presidencies to date ====
No.	Name	Origin country	Took office	Left office
1	Claudio Martini	Italy	2008	2010
2	Michel Vauzelle	France	2010	2014
3	Paúl Carrasco	Ecuador	2014	2016
4	Abdessamad Sekkal	Morocco	2016	2021
5	Rachid El Abdi	Morocco	2021	
