= Saint-Bonnet-le-Froid =

Saint-Bonnet-Le-Froid
- Commune
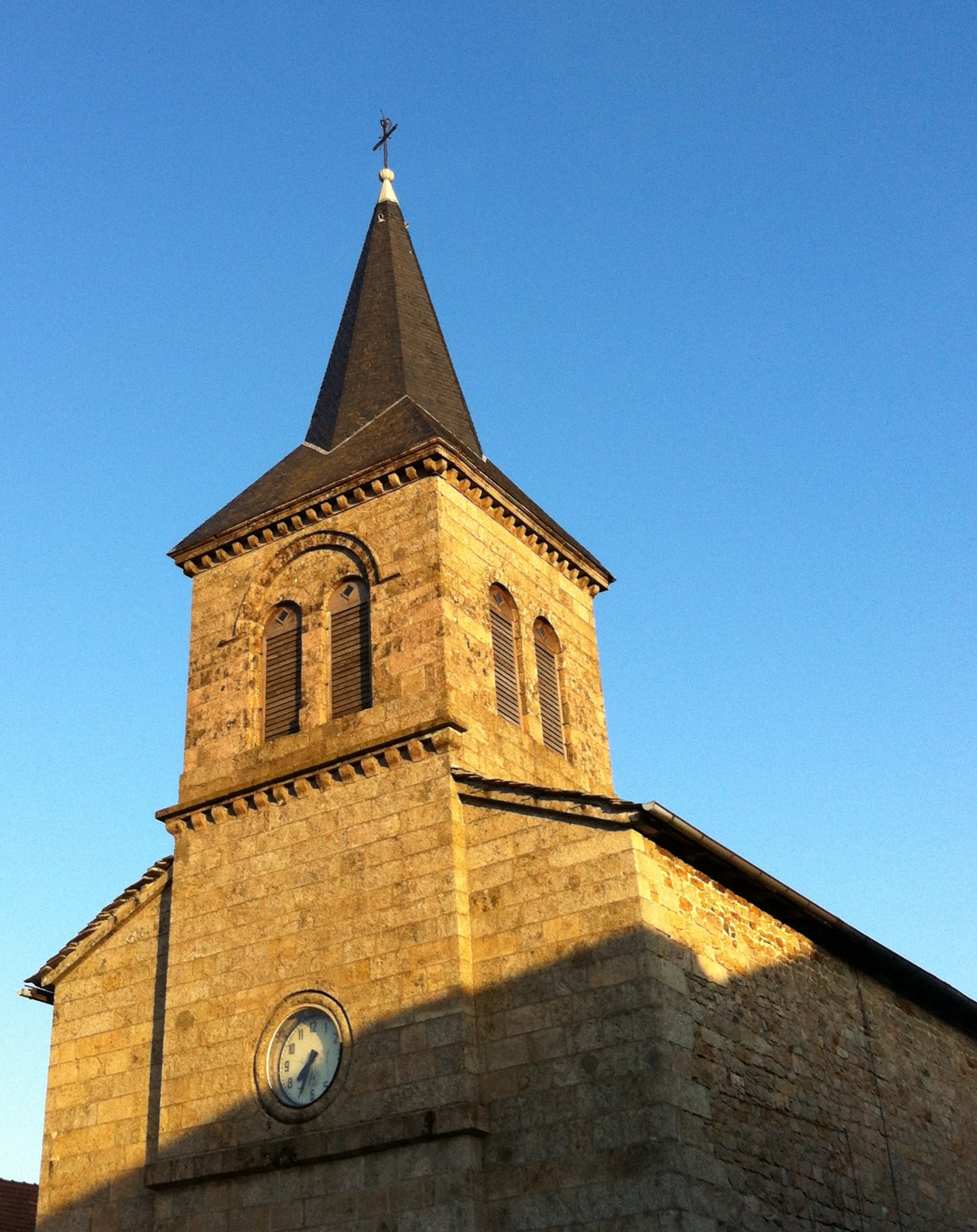
- Location of Saint-Bonnet-Le-Froid
- Location within France Location within Auvergne-Rhône-Alpes
- Coordinates: 45°08′35″N 4°26′10″E
- Country: France
- Region: Auvergne-Rhône-Alpes
- Department: Haute-Loire
- Arrondissement: Yssingeaux
- Canton: Boutières

Government
  - Mayor (2020–2026): Jean-Pierre Santy
- Area^{1}: 13.09 km^{2} (5.05 sq mi)
- Elevation: 1,126 m (3,694 ft)
- Highest elevation: 1,161 m (3,809 ft)
- Lowest elevation: 758 m (2,487 ft)
- Population (2023): 232
  - Density: 17.7/km^{2} (45.9/sq mi)
- Time zone: UTC+01:00 (CET)
  - Summer (DST): UTC+02:00 (CEST)
- INSEE/Postal code: 43172 /43290
- ^{1} French Land Register data, which excludes lakes, ponds, glaciers > 1 km^{2} (0.386 sq mi or 247 acres) and river estuaries.

Saint-Bonnet-le-Froid (French pronunciation: [sɛ̃ bɔnɛ lə fʁwa]; Vivaro-Alpine: Sant Bonet lo Freid) is a commune in the Haute-Loire department in south-central France.

== Population ==
Historical population
Year	Pop.	±% p.a.
1968	200	—
1975	185	−1.11%
1982	180	−0.39%
1990	180	+0.00%
1999	194	+0.84%
2007	235	+2.43%
2012	244	+0.75%
2017	244	+0.00%
2023	232	−0.84%
Source: INSEE

== Personalities ==
- Régis Marcon - 3 Michelin-starred chef, winner of the Bocuse gold medal in 1995 and owner of the Clos des Cimes restaurant.

== See also ==
- Communes of the Haute-Loire department
