= Regional Council of Auvergne-Rhône-Alpes =

Regional council of France

Regional Council of Auvergne-Rhône-Alpes Conseil régional d'Auvergne-Rhône-Alpes
- Coat of arms of Auvergne-Rhône-Alpes

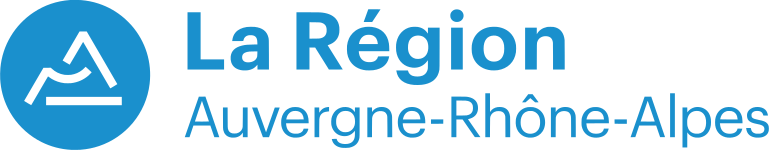
- Logo of Auvergne-Rhône-Alpes

Type
- Type: Regional council

History
- Preceded by: Regional Council of Auvergne; Regional Council of Rhône-Alpes
- New session started: 2 July 2021

Leadership
- President: Fabrice Pannekoucke, LR since 5 September 2024

Structure
- Seats: 204
- Political groups: Majority (136): The Republicans (118); Union of Democrats and Independents (18); Opposition (68): Europe Ecology – The Greens (28); National Rally (17); Socialist Party (13); French Communist Party – La France Insoumise (6); Radical Party of the Left (4)

Elections
- Voting system: Two-round list proportional representation system with majority bonus
- Last election: 20 and 27 June 2021
- Next election: 2028 French regional elections

Meeting place
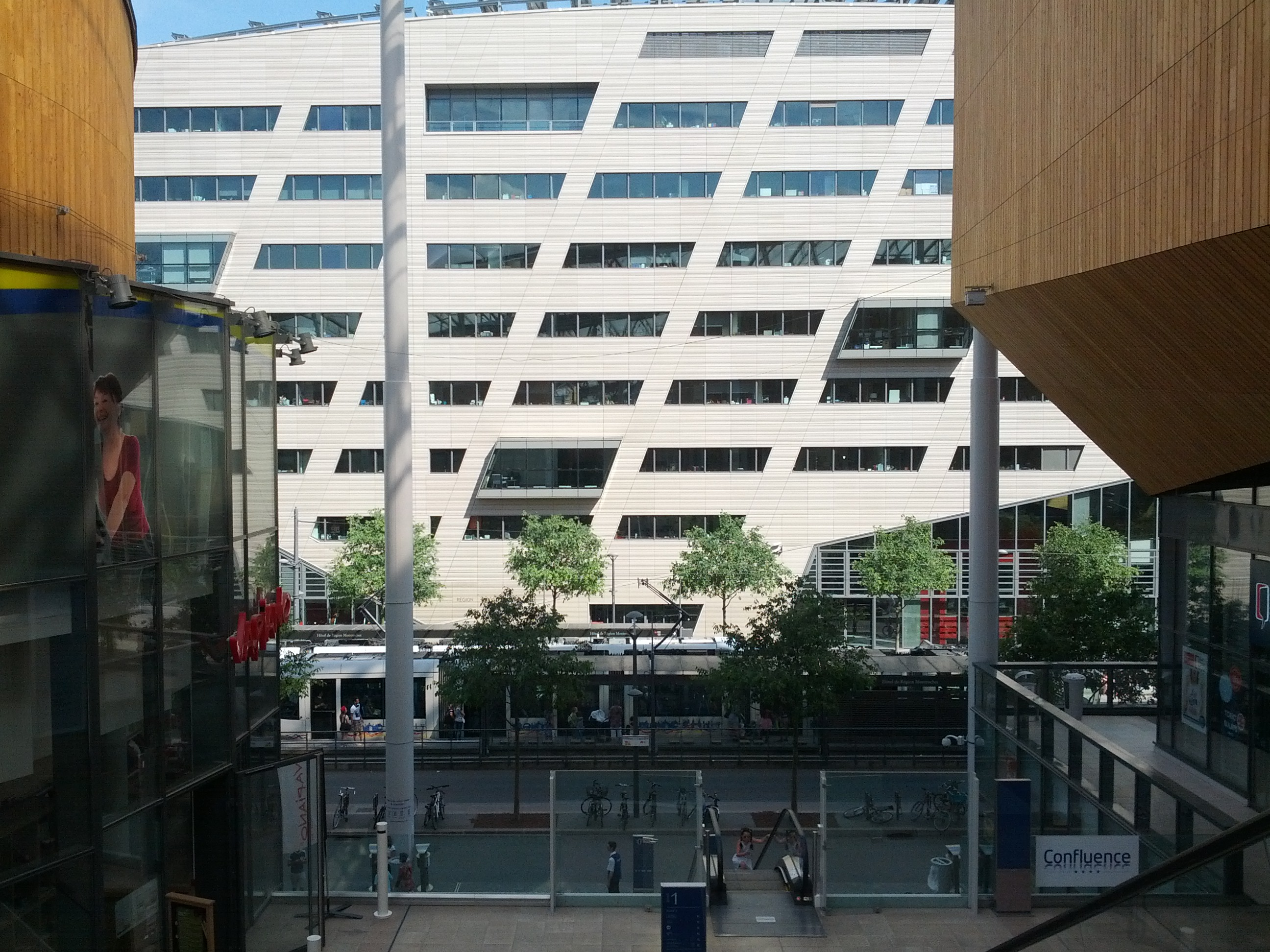
- 1 Esplanade François Mitterrand; CS 20033 – 69269 Lyon cedex 02
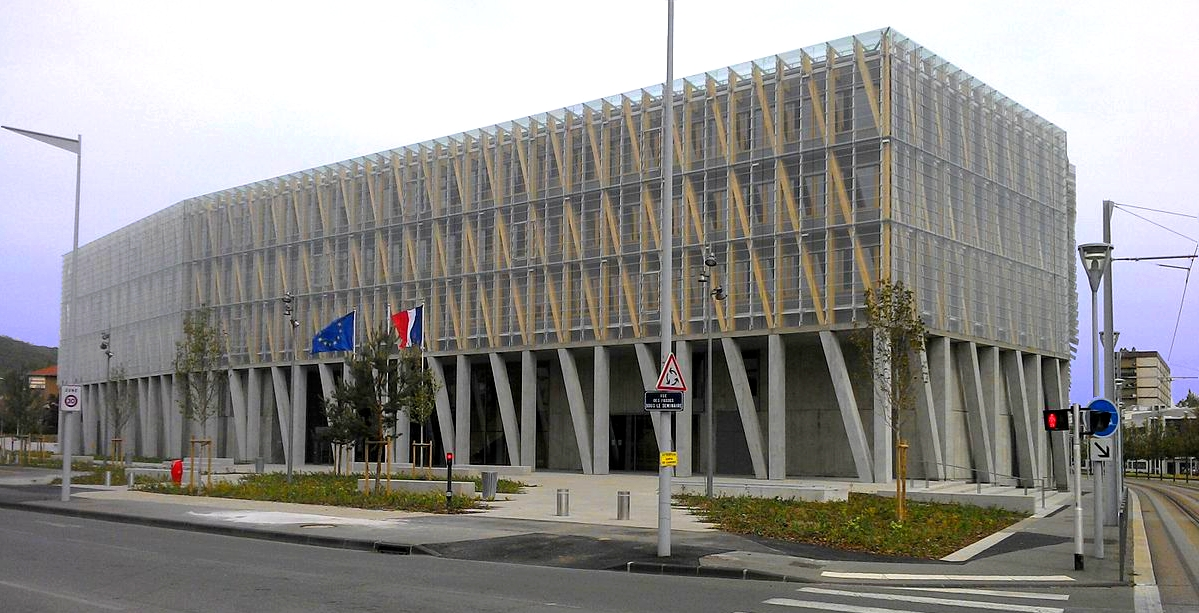
- 59 Boulevard Léon Jouhaux; CS 90706 – 63050 Clermont-Ferrand cedex 2

Website
- www.auvergnerhonealpes.fr

The Regional Council of Auvergne-Rhône-Alpes (French: Conseil régional d'Auvergne-Rhône-Alpes) is the deliberative assembly of the Auvergne-Rhône-Alpes region in southeast-central France. In 2016, the Regional Council of Auvergne-Rhône-Alpes succeeded the Regional Council of Auvergne and Regional Council of Rhône-Alpes.

== History ==
The Regional Council of Auvergne-Rhône-Alpes was created by the act on the delimitation of regions, regional and departmental elections and amending the electoral calendar of 16 January 2015, which went into effect on 1 January 2016 and merged the Regional Council of Auvergne and Regional Council of Rhône-Alpes, consisting of 47 and 156 regional councillors, respectively, into a single body with 204 regional councillors, following regional elections on 6 and 13 December 2015.

== Seat ==
As Lyon was designated as the capital of the new region, the official meeting place of the regional council of Auvergne-Rhône-Alpes is at the Hôtel de Région located in the district of La Confluence in the 2nd arrondissement of Lyon at 1 esplanade François Mitterrand. Originally built at a cost of €147.1 million as the seat of the regional council of Rhône-Alpes, the construction of the building was approved by the regional council on 7 April 2005, followed by a European-level architecture competition from November 2005 to September 2006, the procurement of a building permit on 30 August 2007, groundbreaking on 8 July 2008, and the relocation of employees over a six-week period starting on 19 May 2011.

On 21 June 2014, the new headquarters of the regional council of Auvergne at the Hôtel de Région in Clermont-Ferrand at 59 boulevard Léon Jouhaux was officially opened, built at a cost of €81 million. The fate of the project, approved in 2007 with unanimous support, was questioned given the selection of Lyon as the capital of the new region. Although Jean-Jack Queyranne, president of the regional council of Rhône-Alpes, suggested that the merged region could alternate between the two seats, with plenary assemblies in Lyon and standing committees in Clermont-Ferrand, the idea was scrapped given the comparison to the experience of the European Parliament with its two seats in Brussels and Strasbourg. With Laurent Wauquiez, promising reduced costs, elected president of the region following the 2015 regional elections, any arrangement involving frequent travel between the two cities was definitively ruled out. The building continues to house administrative functionaries, with space rented out for associations and start-ups and serving as a venue for events and conferences in an effort to make the structure profitable. The standing committee of the regional council also occasionally meets in Clermont-Ferrand.

== Election results ==
=== 2015 regional election ===
The current regional council was elected in regional elections on 6 and 13 December 2015, with the list of Laurent Wauquiez consisting of The Republicans (LR), the Democratic Movement (MoDem), and the Union of Democrats and Independents (UDI) securing an absolute majority of 113 seats.

Leader	List	First round		Second round		Seats	
Leader	List	Votes	%	Votes	%	Seats	%
Laurent Wauquiez	LR–MoDem–UDI	795,661	31.73	1,201,597	40.62	113	55.39
Christophe Boudot	FN	639,923	25.52	667,102	22.55	34	16.67
Jean-Jack Queyranne	PS–PRG	600,112	23.93	1,089,756	36.84	57	27.94
Jean-Charles Kohlhaas	EELV–PG–ND	173,038	6.90	1,089,756	36.84	57	27.94
Cécile Cukierman	PCF	135,274	5.39	1,089,756	36.84	57	27.94
Gerbert Rambaud	DLF	71,538	2.85				
Éric Lafond	NC	39,187	1.56				
Chantal Gomez	LO	31,359	1.25				
Alain Fédèle	UPR	21,723	0.87				
Total		2,507,815	100.00	2,958,455	100.00	204	100.00
Valid votes		2,507,815	96.55	2,958,455	96.58		
Blank votes		59,333	2.28	59,166	1.93		
Null votes		30,175	1.16	45,577	1.49		
Turnout		2,597,323	48.91	3,063,198	57.68		
Abstentions		2,713,316	51.09	2,247,266	42.32		
Registered voters		5,310,639		5,310,464			
Source: Ministry of the Interior, Le Monde (parties), Le Dauphiné Libéré (merged lists)

== Composition ==
=== Political groups ===
The regional council of Auvergne-Rhône-Alpes currently consists of seven political groups.

Political group		Members	Parties
LR–DVD–SC	The Republicans, Miscellaneous Right and Civil Society	118	LR, DVD
LE	The Ecologists	28	EELV
LD	The Democrats	18	UDI, MoDem
RN	National Rally	17	RN
SED	Socialists, Ecologists, Democrats	13	PS, DVG
LFI-PCF	Insoumis and Communists	6	PCF, FI
PRG	PRG	4	PRG

== Executive ==
=== Presidents ===
Laurent Wauquiez was elected president of the regional council of Auvergne-Rhône-Alpes at its opening session in Lyon on 4 January 2016.

Candidate	Party	Votes	%
Laurent Wauquiez	LR	113	55.39
Jean-François Debat	PS	42	20.59
Christophe Boudot	FN	34	16.67
Jean-Charles Kohlhaas	EELV	8	3.92
Cécile Cukierman	PCF	7	3.43
Votes		204	100.00
Blank and null votes		0	0.00
Valid votes		204	100.00

=== Vice presidents ===
In addition to the president, the executive consists of 15 vice presidents and 14 advisers.

Number	Regional councillor	Group	Delegate for	Department
1st vice president	Etienne Blanc	LR–DVD–SC	Finance, general administration, budgetary savings and cross-border policies	Ain
2nd vice president	Brice Hortefeux	LR–DVD–SC	Territorial planning and solidarity with the Auvergnat territories	Puy-de-Dôme
3rd vice president	Béatrice Berthoux	LR–DVD–SC	Lycées	Rhône
4th vice president	Éric Fournier	LD	Environment, sustainable development, energy and regional nature parks	Haute-Savoie
5th vice president	Philippe Meunier	LR–DVD–SC	Security, international partnerships, hunting and fishing, airports and airport areas, forests and woodlands	Lyon Metropolis
6th vice president	Annabel André-Laurent	LR–DVD–SC	Enterprises, employment, economic development, trade, crafts and liberal professions	Haute-Savoie
7th vice president	Martine Guibert	LD	Transport	Cantal
8th vice president	Jean-Pierre Taite	LR–DVD–SC	Agriculture, viticulture and local produce	Loire
9th vice president	Samy Kefi-Jérôme	LR–DVD–SC	Social and family policies	Loire
10th vice president	Yannick Neuder	LR–DVD–SC	Higher education, research and innovation, health and European funds	Isère
11th vice president	Stéphanie Pernod-Beaudon	LR–DVD–SC	Vocational training and apprenticeship	Ain
12th vice president	Juliette Jarry	LR–DVD–SC	Infrastructure, economy and digital usages	Lyon Metropolis
13th vice president	Nicolas Daragon	LR–DVD–SC	Tourism and spa industry	Drôme
14th vice president	Florence Verney-Carron	LR–DVD–SC	Culture and heritage	Lyon Metropolis
15th vice president	Marie-Camille Rey	LR–DVD–SC	Youth, sport and associative life	Loire

== Committees ==
The regional council includes 18 thematic committees with advisory roles, each composed of 38 members with a chairperson and two vice chairpersons. The comments of the thematic committees are considered by and submitted to a final vote of the standing committee or in a plenary session. The standing committee consists of the president, 15 vice presidents, and 45 members of the regional council.

Committee	President	Group	Department
Social action, city policy and housing	Jérôme Moroge	LR–DVD–SC	Lyon Metropolis
Cultural affairs	Marlène Mourier	LR–DVD–SC	Drôme
Agriculture, rurality, viticulture and food	Jean-Pierre Vigier	LR–DVD–SC	Haute-Loire
Local economy, trade, crafts and liberal professions	Alain Berlioz-Curlet	LR–DVD–SC	Lyon Metropolis
Higher education and research	Pierre Bérat	LR–DVD–SC	Lyon Metropolis
Enterprise, economy and employment	Daniel Dugléry	LR–DVD–SC	Allier
Environment, sustainable development and energy	Michèle Cedrin	LD	Isère
Finance, general administration	Thierry Kovacs	LR–DVD–SC	Isère
Continuing education and apprenticeship	Lionel Filippi	LD	Isère
Initial education and lycées	Claude Aurias	LD	Drôme
Mountain	Gilles Chabert	LR–DVD–SC	Isère
Digital	Samy Kefi-Jerome	LD	Loire
International relations and agricultural agreements	Alain Marleix	LR–DVD–SC	Cantal
Health, family, and disabled persons policy	Isabelle Masseboeuf	LD	Ardèche
Security	Yves-Marie Uhlrich	LD	Lyon Metropolis
Tourism and spa industry	Annabel André-Laurent	LR–DVD–SC	Haute-Savoie
Transport, territorial planning and infrastructure	Jean-Pierre Taite	LR–DVD–SC	Loire
Associative life, sport and youth	Xavier Breton	LR–DVD–SC	Ain
