= Departmental Council of Haute-Loire =

Departmental legislature in France

Departmental Council of Haute-Loire Conseil départemental de la Haute-Loire

Leadership
- President: Marie-Agnès Petit, LR since 1 July 2021

Structure
- Seats: 38
- Political groups: Government (34): DVD (22); LR (6); UDI (5); LC (1); Opposition (4): DVG (3); PS (1); www.hauteloire.fr

The Departmental Council of Haute-Loire (French: Conseil départemental de la Haute-Loire) is the deliberative assembly of the Haute-Loire department in the region of Auvergne-Rhône-Alpes. It consists of 38 members (general councilors) from 19 cantons and its headquarters are in Le Puy-en-Velay.

The president of the general council is Marie-Agnès Petit.

== See also ==
- Haute-Loire
- General councils of France
