= Régions et Peuples Solidaires =

Federation of French regionalist political parties

Régions et Peuples Solidaires (English: Regions and Peoples in Solidarity) is a political federation of various regionalist parties (particularly of centre-left affiliation) in France. It was founded in 1995, in order to organise a coordinated fight against "Parisian centrism" and "Jacobin conception of peoples" on the French state level. Its presidents included Gustave Alirol, the chairman of the Occitan Party.

The federation has ties with the European Free Alliance. François Alfonsi of the Party of the Corsican Nation was elected as an MEP in the 2009 European election (South-East) on the Europe Ecology list, and is a member of the Greens–European Free Alliance Group in the European Parliament.

== Membership ==
=== Full members ===
| Region | Party | European Party |
|---|---|---|
| Alsace | Unser Land | EFA / FUEN |
| Brittany | Breton Democratic Union | EFA |
| Corsica | Party of the Corsican Nation | EFA |
| Corsica | Femu a Corsica | EFA |
| Moselle | Mosellans' Party | − |
| Northern Basque Country | Eusko Alkartasuna | EFA |
| Northern Basque Country | Euskal Herria Bai | − |
| Northern Basque Country | Basque Nationalist Party | EDP |
| Northern Catalonia | YES to the Catalan Country | − |
| Northern Catalonia | Catalan Unity | EFA |
| Northern Catalonia | Republican Left of Catalonia | EFA |
| Occitania | Occitan Party | EFA |
| Savoy | Savoy Region Movement | EFA |

=== Associate members ===
- Tamazgha and Amazigh diaspora
  - World Amazigh Congress

=== Former members ===
- Franche-Comté
  - Franche-Comté's People Rally (ceased existence in 1999)
- Brittany
  - Breton Liberty (merged with the UDB in 2008)
