= Occitan Party =

Occitan Party Partit Occitan
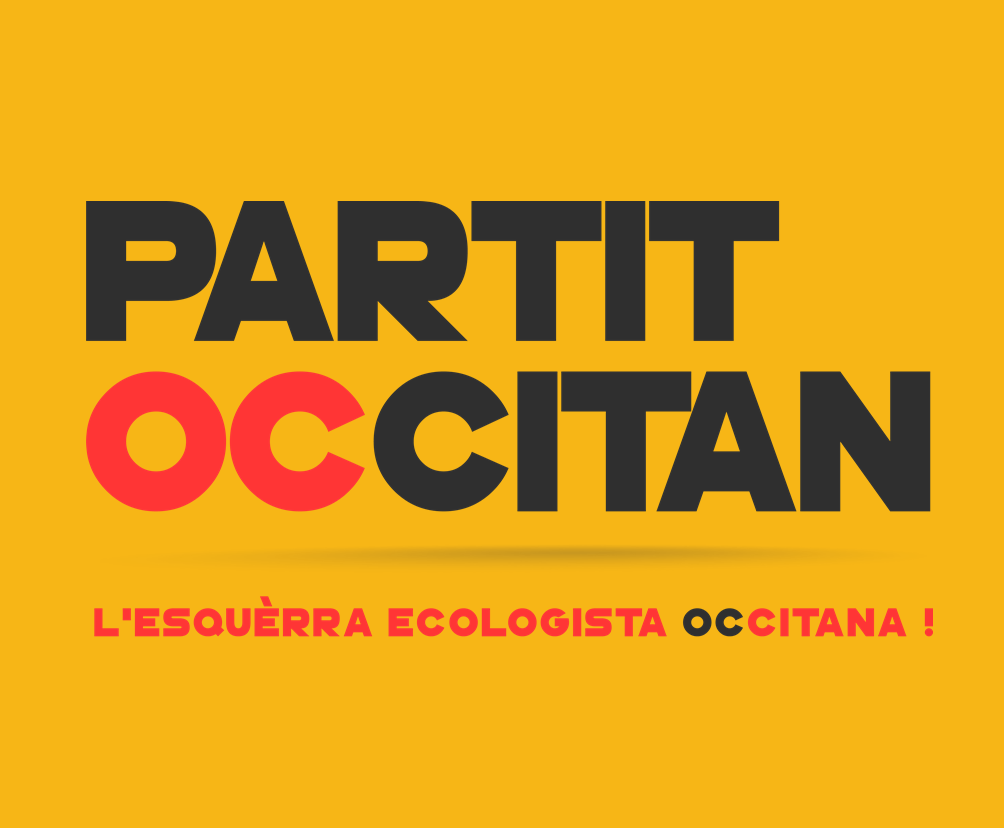
- Abbreviation: POC
- Leader: Gustave Alirol
- Founded: 1987
- Headquarters: B. P. 31, 16270, Roumazières-Loubert
- Ideology: Occitan nationalism Regionalism; Autonomism; Socialism; Environmentalism
- Political position: Left-wing
- National affiliation: Socialist Party; The Greens; The Ecologists; Party of the Corsican Nation; Breton Democratic Union
- Regional affiliation: Mouvement Region Provence
- European affiliation: European Free Alliance
- Colours: Red; Gold; Black
- Regional Council of Occitania: 0 / 158
- National Assembly: 0 / 577
- Senate: 0 / 348
- European Parliament: 0 / 79

Website
- partitoccitan.org

The Occitan Party (Occitan: Partit Occitan, [paɾˈtit utsiˈta], abbreviated to POC) is a left-wing regionalist political party in France. Its aims include greater autonomy for the historical region of Occitania, southern France. The Occitan Party was formed in Toulouse in 1987 through the union of different Occitanist movements (Volem Viure al Païs, Païs Nòstre etc.), of candidates to the 1986 regional elections and of various individuals.

The party described itself as an "autonomist progressive movement" and particularly focuses on local and regional politics, including grassroots protests, environmental groups, Occitan cultural circles, and trade unions. According to its program, the Occitan Party fights for "the recognition and the autonomy of the Occitanian country" and declares its active presence "in the economic struggles or against the threats to the [Occitan] territory”, "in the struggles for jobs, against touristification, against nuclear energy, for the safeguard of the natural patrimony" and "in the actions to protect the Occitanian language and identity". It actively promotes environmentalist and alter-globalization causes. The party is also described as socialist and is in an electoral alliance with the French Socialist Party, and released statements supportive of the French Communist Party.

The party's aims are:

- To set up a credible Occitanist political movement, independent of all other parties and struggling for Occitan self-government.
- To dis-alienate and raise the consciousness of the Occitan people.
- To make the Occitan question come out in the political field.

== Electoral and political action ==
Since 1987, the Occitan Party has contested elections at all levels in different constituencies. In the 1997 parliamentary elections, the POC's best candidates polled 1.8% of the vote. Party members hold office in a few townships, including Saint-Hostien.

The Occitan Party takes part in economical or regional development struggles. Its members are active in struggles for the keeping of local jobs, against wholesale tourist commercialization, against the nuclear power industry, and for the preservation of Occitania's natural environment. They also take part in the defence of the Occitan language and identity.

The Party's paper, Occitània, comes out every two months.

== International relationships ==
The Occitan Party belongs to the Fédération Régions et Peuples Solidaires federation which brings together different regionalist and nationalist political movements in the French state. The Occitan Party also belongs to the European Free Alliance.

== Internal organisation ==
Local or departmental committees are grouped in regional federations. The National Council brings together delegates from the different regional federations (the party's parliament). The National Bureau is elected every two years by a Congress that is open to every party member.

== Ideology ==
The Occitan Party is described as left-wing, and actively cooperates with fellow left-wing parties such as the French Socialist Party, Green Party, and other left-wing regionalist parties in France such as the Party of the Corsican Nation and the Breton Democratic Union. The party subscribes to socialist ideals, and argues that every Occitan worker "should be able to earn a wage directly linked to his work, almost independently of market conditions." The party supports the alter-globalization movement and discusses the destructive impact of globalization on the environment as well as regional languages, including Occitan. The party also describes itself as anti-fascist, and beyond praising the French Socialist Party, its electoral ally, the Occitan Party also wrote positive statements about the French Communist Party, and called for negotiations that would open the Communist Party to embracing regionalist causes.

It defines itself as an "autonomist progressive movement" and particularly focuses on local and regional politics, including grassroots protests, environmental groups, Occitan cultural circles, and trade unions. According to its program, the Occitan Party fights for "the recognition and the autonomy of the Occitanian country" and declares its active presence "in the economic struggles or against the threats to the [Occitan] territory”, "in the struggles for jobs, against touristification, against nuclear energy, for the safeguard of the natural patrimony" and "in the actions to protect the Occitanian language and identity". The party also supports the independence and regionalist movements of other nations within France such as Brittany and Corsica, while also supporting Catalan independence and Scottish independence. In its declaration, the POC expressed its support for the indigenous "peoples' right to self-determination" and native "peoples' right to protect their political, economic and cultural rights".

The party calls for an Occitan national revival, stating that Occitania must once again be seen as a nation rather than a 'megaregion'; the cultural revival of Occitania is to reverse the effects of French discriminatory policies such as Vergonha, considered a linguicide and a cultural genocide. Including radical demands such as national independence, the party also calls for gradual steps, such as recognition and protection for Occitan language and culture, and representation of Occitania in the French government. While the party has been described as "radical" in their vision for independent Occitania, the party also expressed its support for gradual reforms, such as the "France of regions".

Demands of the party also include autonomy, including a possible network of several autonomies, for the entire Occitan region and community. The party focuses on cultural demands along with autonomous and separatist ones. Occitan Party recognizes the particularly unique character of Provençal amongst the varieties of Occitan, and has a special subdivision of the party known as the Provence Region Movement (Occitan: Mouvement Region Provence, MRP)). The MRP calls for introducing the Provençal language in schools and protection of the Provençal and Occitan culture, and envisions special status and autonomy for Provence, either within autonomous or independent Occitania. The presence of the MRP also displays the diverse character of the Occitan regionalist movement, as there exists localist particuralism in regions such as Provence, Auvergnat and Gascon, who stress that Occitania should not be treated as unitary.
