= Saint-Hostien =

- Commune
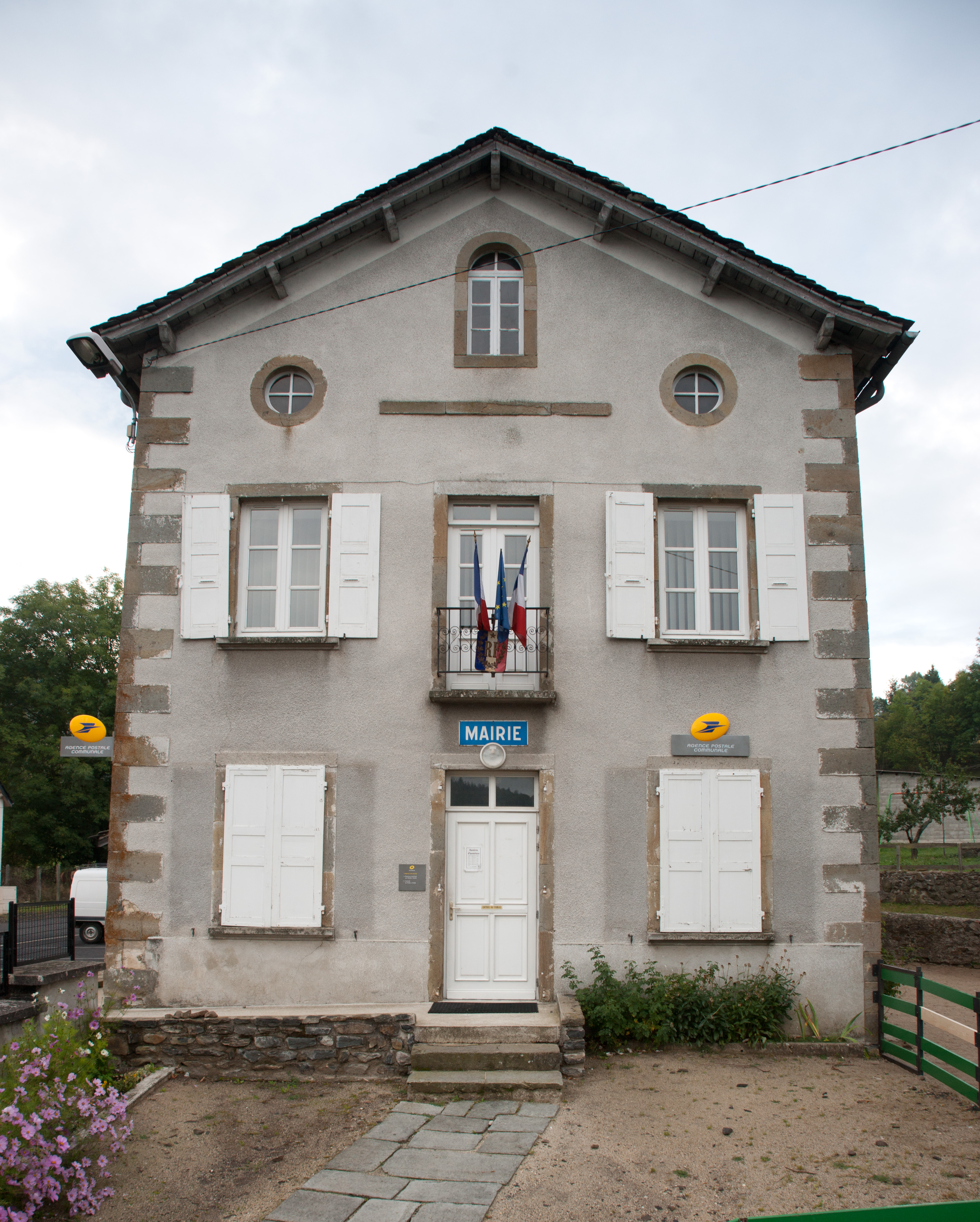
- Town hall
- Location of Saint-Hostien
- Location within France Location within Auvergne-Rhône-Alpes
- Coordinates: 45°04′23″N 4°02′54″E
- Country: France
- Region: Auvergne-Rhône-Alpes
- Department: Haute-Loire
- Arrondissement: Le Puy-en-Velay
- Canton: Emblavez-et-Meygal
- Intercommunality: CA du Puy-en-Velay

Government
  - Mayor (2020–2026): Isabelle Verdun
- Area^{1}: 13.49 km^{2} (5.21 sq mi)
- Elevation: 830 m (2,720 ft)
- Highest elevation: 1,204 m (3,950 ft)
- Lowest elevation: 747 m (2,451 ft)
- Population (2023): 697
  - Density: 51.7/km^{2} (134/sq mi)
- Time zone: UTC+01:00 (CET)
  - Summer (DST): UTC+02:00 (CEST)
- INSEE/Postal code: 43194 /43260
- ^{1} French Land Register data, which excludes lakes, ponds, glaciers > 1 km^{2} (0.386 sq mi or 247 acres) and river estuaries.

Saint-Hostien (French pronunciation: [sɛ̃.t‿ɔstjɛ̃]; Occitan: Sant Ostian) is a commune in the Haute-Loire department in south-central France.

== Population ==
Historical population
Year	Pop.	±% p.a.
1968	581	—
1975	514	−1.74%
1982	541	+0.73%
1990	578	+0.83%
1999	578	+0.00%
2007	612	+0.72%
2012	703	+2.81%
2017	755	+1.44%
2023	697	−1.32%
Source: INSEE

== See also ==
- Communes of the Haute-Loire department
