= Laurent Wauquiez =

French politician (born 1975)

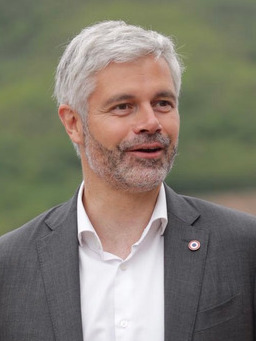
- Wauquiez in 2021

President of the Regional Council of Auvergne-Rhône-Alpes
- In office 4 January 2016 – 23 August 2024
- Preceded by: René Souchon; (Auvergne); Jean-Jack Queyranne; (Rhône-Alpes)
- Succeeded by: Fabrice Pannekoucke

President of The Republicans
- In office 10 December 2017 – 2 June 2019 (Note: Acting: 23 August 2016 – 29 November 2016)
- Preceded by: Nicolas Sarkozy
- Succeeded by: Christian Jacob

Minister of Higher Education and Research
- In office 29 June 2011 – 10 May 2012
- Prime Minister: François Fillon
- Preceded by: Valérie Pécresse
- Succeeded by: Geneviève Fioraso

Minister for European Affairs
- In office 14 November 2010 – 29 June 2011
- Prime Minister: François Fillon
- Preceded by: Pierre Lellouche
- Succeeded by: Geneviève Fioraso

Mayor of Le Puy-en-Velay
- In office 14 March 2008 – 29 January 2016
- Preceded by: Arlette Arnaud-Landau
- Succeeded by: Michel Chapuis

Spokesperson of the Government
- In office 18 June 2007 – 18 March 2008
- Prime Minister: François Fillon
- Preceded by: Christine Albanel
- Succeeded by: Luc Chatel

Member of the National Assembly for Haute-Loire's 1st constituency
- Incumbent
- Assumed office 8 July 2024
- Preceded by: Isabelle Valentin
- In office 20 June 2012 – 21 June 2017
- Preceded by: Jean-Pierre Marcon
- Succeeded by: Isabelle Valentin
- In office 5 July 2004 – 19 July 2007
- Preceded by: Jacques Barrot
- Succeeded by: Jean-Pierre Marcon

President of the Republican Right group in the National Assembly
- Incumbent
- Assumed office 10 July 2024
- Preceded by: Olivier Marleix

Personal details
- Born: Laurent Timothée Marie Wauquiez; 12 April 1975 (age 51) Lyon, France
- Party: LR (2015–present)
- Other political affiliations: UMP (2004–2015)
- Spouse: Charlotte Deregnaucourt (m. 2001)
- Children: 2
- Education: École normale supérieure Panthéon-Sorbonne University; Sciences Po; École nationale d'administration

Laurent Timothée Marie Wauquiez ([lɔʁɑ̃ timɔte maʁi vokje]; born 12 April 1975) is a French politician who presided over the Regional Council of Auvergne-Rhône-Alpes from 2016 to 2024. He is a member of The Republicans (LR), which he led from 2017 to 2019 following the resignation of Nicolas Sarkozy.

Wauquiez was Secretary of State for European Affairs under the Foreign Minister Alain Juppé; and previously Secretary of State for Employment under the Minister of the Economy, Industry and Employment from March 2008 in François Fillon's government. He also was Government Spokesman from June 2007 to March 2008 as Minister of State under the Prime Minister. He was elected as 2nd Vice President of the ORU Fogar at the organisation's General Assembly held in Quito, Ecuador on 16 October 2016.

On 10 December 2017, Wauquiez was elected to the presidency of The Republicans with 74% of the vote. Pundits have described him as moving the party to the right. On 2 June 2019, a week after overseeing the worst result for the right in its history in the European election with 8% of the vote, Wauquiez resigned as party president.

After 2024 legislative election, Wauquiez became president of the LR group in the National Assembly.

== Early life and education ==
Wauquiez graduated from the École normale supérieure in 1994 and Université Panthéon-Sorbonne with a masters in history and studied public law at the Institut d'études politiques de Paris (Sciences Po); he later attended the École nationale d'administration (ÉNA). He worked as professor at Emlyon Business School.

== Political career ==
Wauquiez held several governmental positions over the course of Nicolas Sarkozy's presidency. He was named the Secretary of State for Employment in 2008 and also functioned as the government spokesman. He later served as Minister of European Affairs and of Higher Education. In 2012, he was re-elected to the National Assembly and became head of the Auvergne-Rhône-Alpes region in 2015.

In 2012, Wauquiez opposed legalisation of same-sex marriage.

On 10 December 2017, Wauquiez was elected as the president of The Republicans, winning over Maël de Calan and Florence Portelli. During his time in office, he overrode party scepticism to appoint François-Xavier Bellamy to lead the LR list in the European elections. He resigned in June 2019, bowing to pressure to step down after a his party’s weak performance in the elections.

In August 2021, Wauquiez decided not to run as the Republicans’s candidate in the 2022 presidential election.

Ahead of the Republicans' 2022 convention, Wauquiez endorsed Éric Ciotti as the party's chairman.

Although he had previously promised not to participate in a government coalition after the 2024 legislative election, LR ultimately joined the Barnier government, led by an LR member. After Michel Barnier's ousting, LR joined the Bayrou government.

In February 2025, Wauquiez announced his candidacy to reclaim the presidency of The Republicans, in 2025 The Republicans leadership election. Wauquiez sparked outrage in France, even within his own conservative circles, after proposing to send migrants awaiting deportation to French overseas territory Saint Pierre and Miquelon. However, he secured only 26% of the vote in the May 18 election, losing to Minister of the Interior Bruno Retailleau.

== Personal life ==
Wauquiez is known for wearing a red parka coat.

== List of mandates and functions ==
=== Governmental functions ===
Minister of Higher Education and Research
2011-2012
Minister for European Affairs
2010-2011
Secretary of State to the Prime Minister, Government Spokesperson
2007-2008
Secretary of State for Employment
2008-2010

=== Electoral mandates ===
==== National Assembly of France ====
- Member of the National Assembly of France for Haute-Loire's 1st constituency
- 2004-2007 (He became secretary of State in 2007) / Since 2012
- Elected 2004 (by-election)
- Reelected 2007 and 2012.

==== Regional Council ====
President of the Regional Council of Auvergne-Rhône-Alpes : since 2016

==== Municipal Council ====
Mayor of Le Puy-en-Velay : 2008-2016 (Resignation). Reelected in 2014.

Municipal councillor of Le Puy-en-Velay : 2008-2016 (Resignation). Reelected in 2014.

== Notes and references ==
=== References ===
Political offices
| Preceded by Valérie Pécresse | Minister of Higher Education and Research; 2011–2012 | Succeeded by Geneviève Fioraso |
