= Regional Council of Auvergne =

Regional legislature of Auvergne, France

Regional Council of Auvergne Conseil régional d'Auvergne

Type
- Type: Unicameral

History
- Founded: July 5, 1972
- Disbanded: January 1, 2016
- Seats: 47

Elections
- Last election: 2010

Meeting place
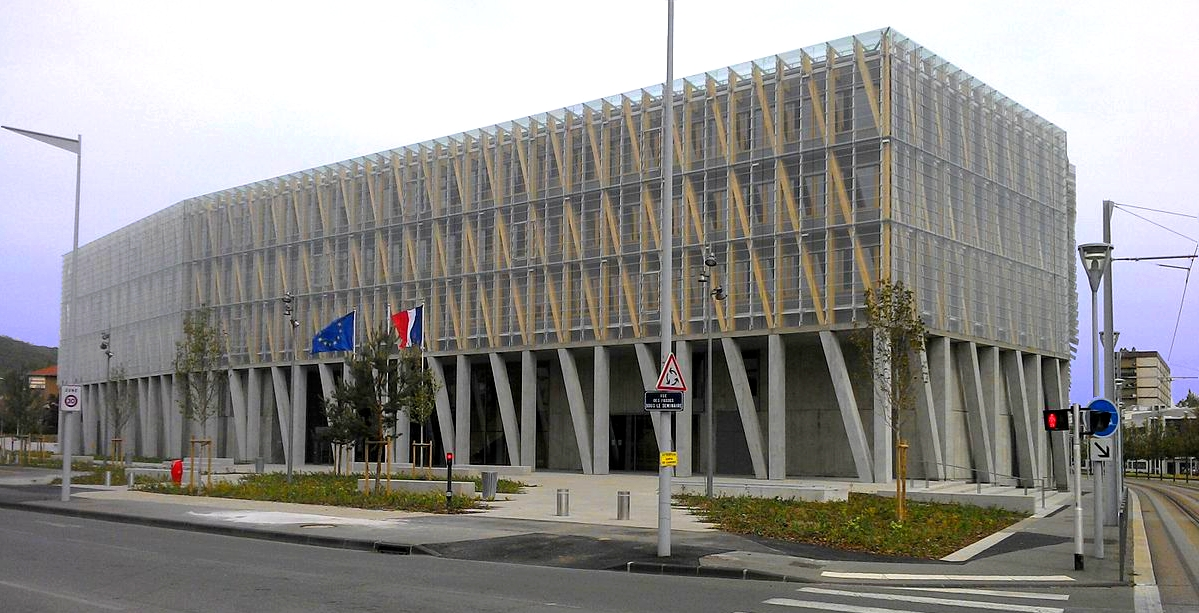
- Hôtel de region, Clermont-Ferrand

The Regional Council of Auvergne (French: Conseil régional d'Auvergne, Occitan: Conselh regional d'Auvèrnhe) was the deliberative assembly of the former French region of Auvergne. The assembly sat in Clermont-Ferrand.

The regional council was made up of 47 regional councilors elected from its departments, distributed as:

- 11 from Allier;
- 5 from Cantal;
- 8 from Haute-Loire;
- 23 from Puy-de-Dôme

== Headquarters ==
The headquarters of the Regional Council was first located in Chamalières in the Carrefour Europe district, at 13-15 Avenue de Fontmaure.

The Regional Council moved between March and April 2014 to 59, boulevard Léon-Jouhaux in Montferrand. The various services were grouped together in a single low-consumption building built near the Roger-Quilliot art museum.

The merger with the Rhône-Alpes region and the attachment of services and functions to the metropolis of Lyon led to the desertion of the building, the "usefulness" of which was questioned just a few days after its inauguration, the overall cost of which had cost the Auvergne region more than 80 million euros. After long controversies over the possibility of selling it or keeping it to host parliamentary sessions, the building was finally sublet to startups specializing in digital activities, to services in the metropolis of Clermont-Ferrand including the GIP Quartier numérique with budgetary management regularly pinpointed by the Court of Auditors.

Its inauguration took place on June 21, 2014.

== Presidents of the Regional Council ==
The Auvergne regional council has had six presidents:

List of successive presidents
Period		President	Party	Other mandates
January 11, 1974	January 31, 1977	Jean Morellon	FNRI then UDF	Member of Parliament for Puy-de-Dôme (1969-1981)
January 31, 1977	October 17, 1977	Augustin Chauvet	RPR	Member of Parliament for Cantal (1956-1980); Mayor of Mauriac (1965-1983)
October 17, 1977	March 21, 1986	Maurice Pourchon	PS	Former Clermont-Ferrand municipal councilor; Former general councilor; Regional councilor (1974-1977)
March 21, 1986	April 2, 2004	Valéry Giscard d'Estaing	UDF	Former President of the Republic (1974-1981); Member of Parliament for Puy-de-Dôme (1984-1989; 1993-2002); General Councilor for the canton of Chamalières (1982-1988)
April 2, 2004	January 18, 2006; (death)	Pierre-Joël Bonté	PS	Former mayor of Riom; Former chairman of the general council of Puy-de-Dôme
February 13, 2006	December 31, 2015	René Souchon	PS	Former minister; Former mayor of Aurillac

== Budget ==
In 2014, the budget for the Auvergne region was 675 million euros, including 139 million for transport, 100 for education and high schools, 115 for vocational training and apprenticeship, and 51 for economic action.

In 2015, the budget amounted to 671 million euros, including 138 million for transport, 97 for education and high schools, 115 for vocational training and apprenticeship, and 55 for economic action.
