= 2025 The Republicans (France) leadership election =

2025 The Republicans leadership election
- 17–18 May
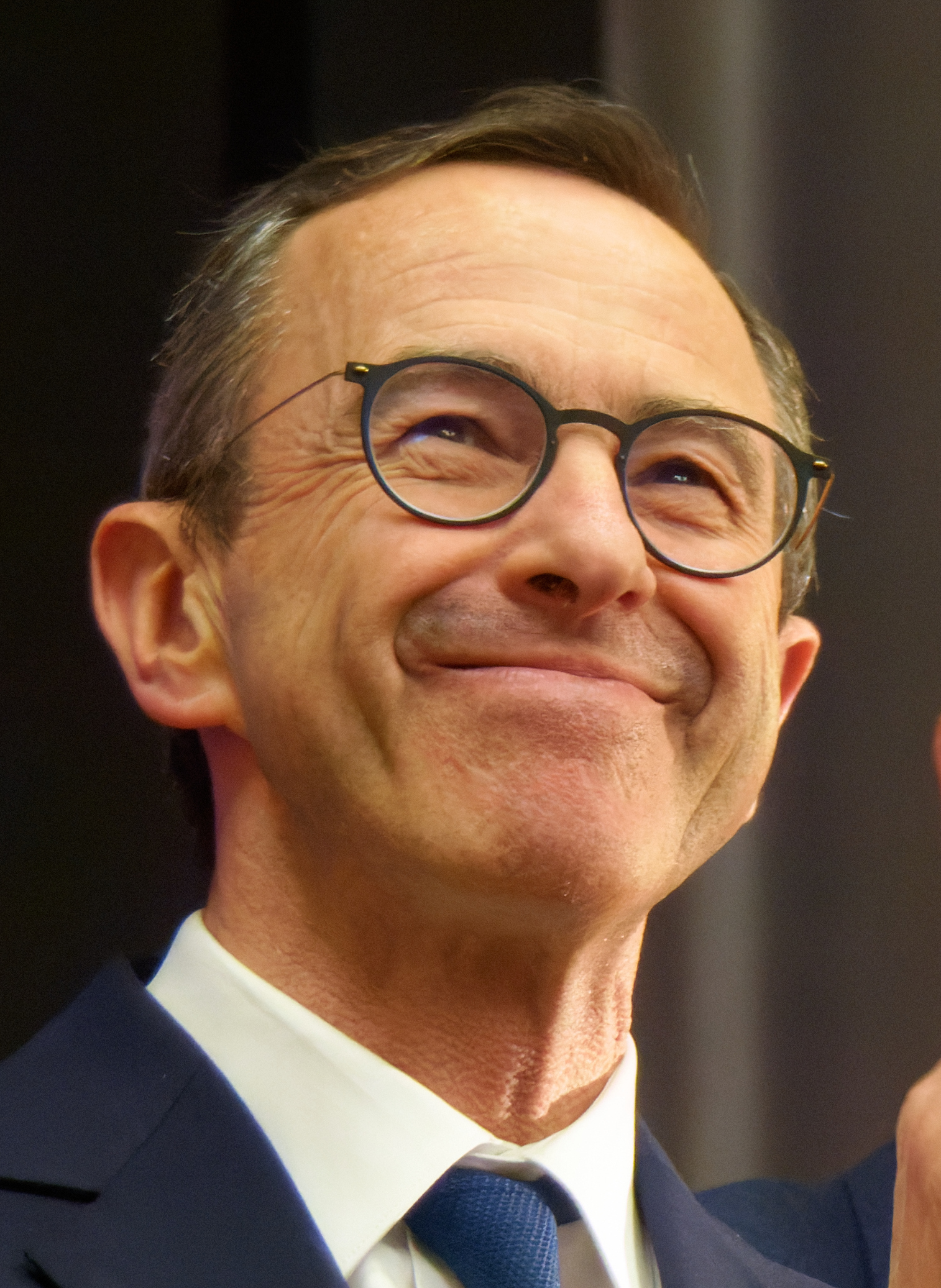

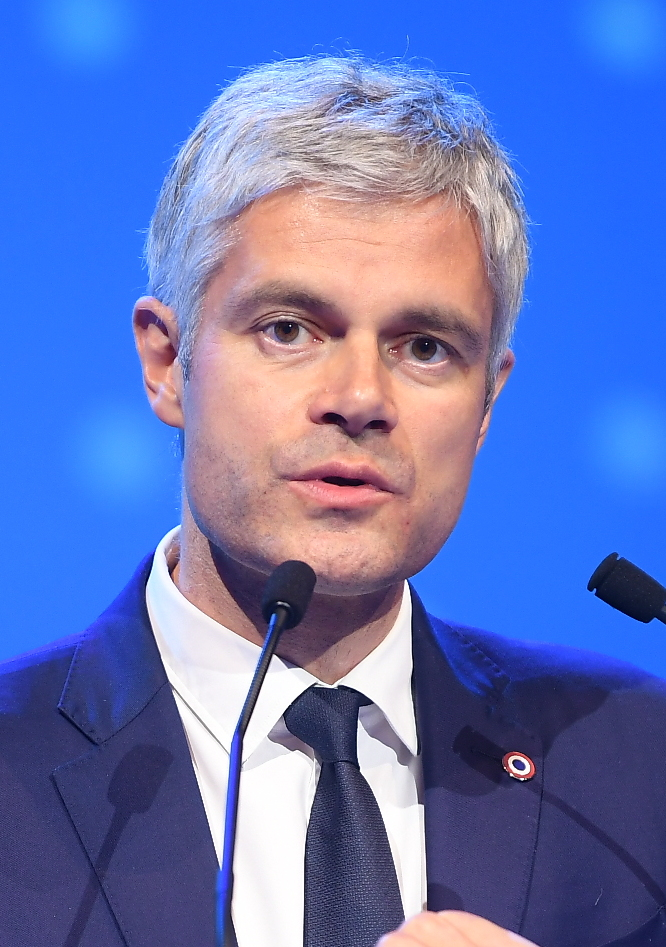
Nominee	Bruno Retailleau	Laurent Wauquiez
Party	LR	LR
Popular vote	72,629	25,107
Percentage	74.31	25.69
President before election
Interim collegial leadership
Elected President
Bruno Retailleau

The 2025 The Republicans leadership election was held on 17–18 May following the resignation of Éric Ciotti in the aftermath of the 2024 The Republicans alliance crisis. As only two candidates registered to run, no second round was scheduled.

Interior Minister Bruno Retailleau, who placed second in the previous leadership election in 2022, faced off against president of the Republican Right group in the National Assembly Laurent Wauquiez, who previously led the party from 2017 to 2019. Retailleau won the election in a landslide with 74.3% of the vote.

== Results ==
Candidate	Party	First round	
Candidate	Party	Votes	%
Bruno Retailleau	LR	72,629	74.31
Laurent Wauquiez	LR	25,107	25.69
Votes cast		97,736	99.62
Blank and invalid votes		374	0.38
Total		98,110	100
Abstention		23,507	19.33
Registered / participation		121,617	80.67
