= Othman Nasrou =

French politician (born 1987)

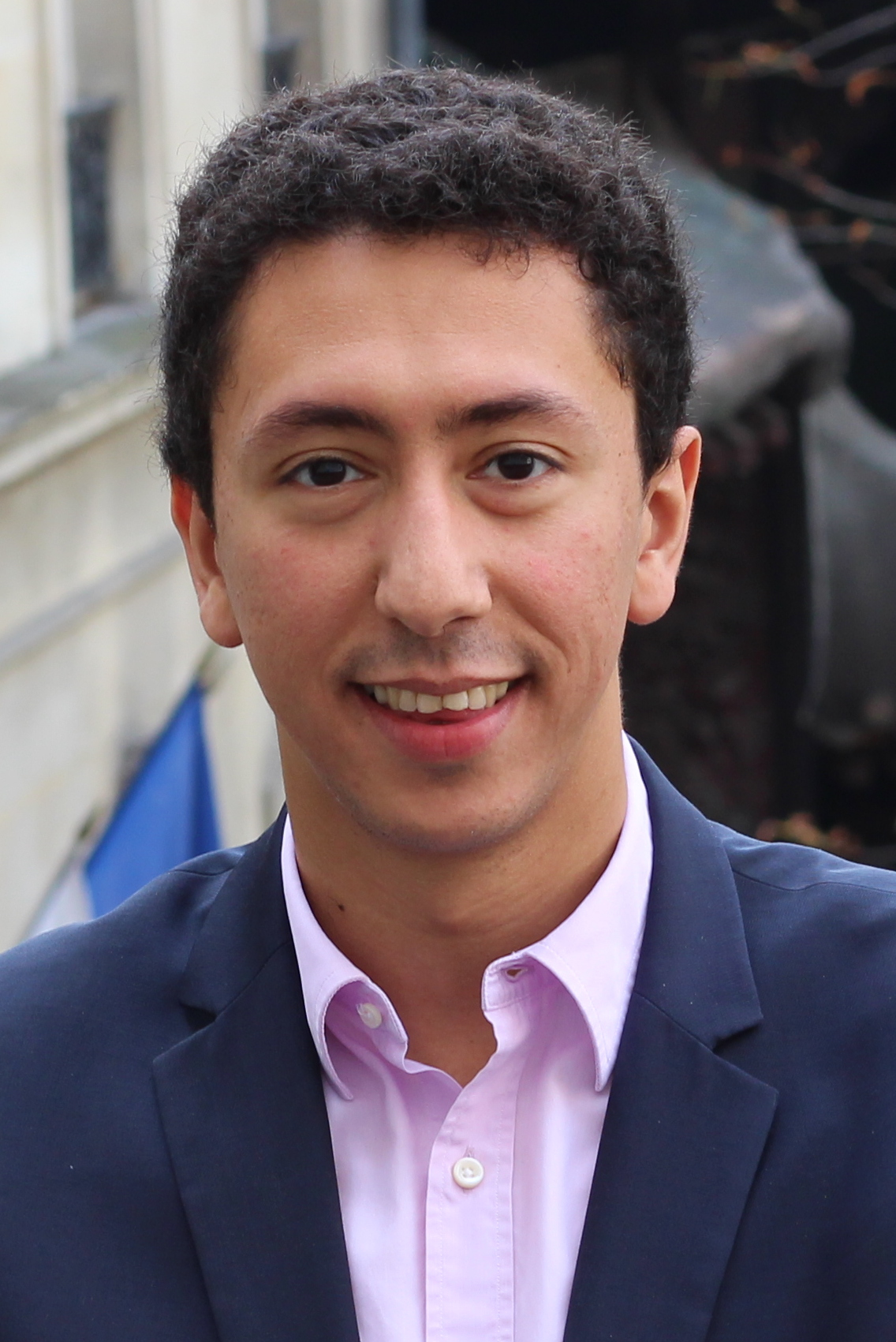
- Nasrou in 2017

Secretary-General of The Republicans
- Incumbent
- Assumed office 21 May 2025
- President: Bruno Retailleau
- Preceded by: Annie Genevard

Secretary of State for Citizenship and the Fight Against Discrimination
- In office 21 September 2024 – 23 December 2024
- Prime Minister: Michel Barnier
- Preceded by: Sabrina Agresti-Roubache (Citizenship); Aurore Bergé (Discrimination)
- Succeeded by: Aurore Bergé

Member of the Regional Council of Île-de-France
- Incumbent
- Assumed office 18 December 2015
- President: Valérie Pécresse

Member of the Trappes City Council
- Incumbent
- Assumed office 4 April 2014

Personal details
- Born: 13 July 1987 (age 38) Casablanca, Morocco
- Citizenship: Morocco; France (since 2012)
- Party: LR (since 2015); SL (since 2019)
- Other political affiliations: UMP (until 2015)
- Education: Lycée Lyautey; Lycée privé Sainte-Geneviève
- Alma mater: HEC Paris

Othman Nasrou (born 13 July 1987) is a Moroccan-born French politician of The Republicans (LR) who has been serving as a member of the Regional Council of Île-de-France since 2015. From September to December 2024, he briefly served as the Secretary of State for Citizenship and the Fight Against Discrimination in the government of Prime Minister Michel Barnier.

== Early life and education ==
A former student of the Lycée Lyautey in Casablanca and the Lycée privé Sainte-Geneviève in Versailles, Nasrou joined HEC Paris in 2007, from which he graduated in 2012. He acquired French nationality by naturalization on 25 June 2012.

== Political career ==
In the municipal elections in Trappes in 2014, Nasrou led the Union for a Popular Movement-UDI-MoDem union list and reached the second round of the election where he obtained the score of 30.53%. This score tilts the Saint-Quentin-en-Yvelines Urban Community (CASQY) to the right by providing an additional seat. He was elected vice-president of the urban community, responsible for economic development in 2018.

In 2015, Valérie Pécresse appointed Nasrou as her spokesperson in Yvelines, as part of her campaign for the regional elections in Île-de-France. He became her Soyons libres party’s regional advisor in December 2015, then vice-president in charge of international affairs and tourism in July 2016.

On 6 March 2024, Nasrou was appointed campaign director of LR for the European elections, alongside François-Xavier Bellamy and Céline Imart.

Nasrou was a candidate in Yvelines's 3rd constituency in the 2024 French legislative election, a constituency where the LR list in the European elections achieved 16% of the votes, more than double its national result (7%). He was beaten against another candidate claiming to be from The Republicans, supported by Éric Ciotti and the National Rally.

In the Republicans' 2025 leadership election, Nasrou endorsed Bruno Retailleau to succeed Ciotti as the party's new chair and became his campaign director.
