= 2024 The Republicans alliance crisis =

2024 French political crisis

Political figures involved

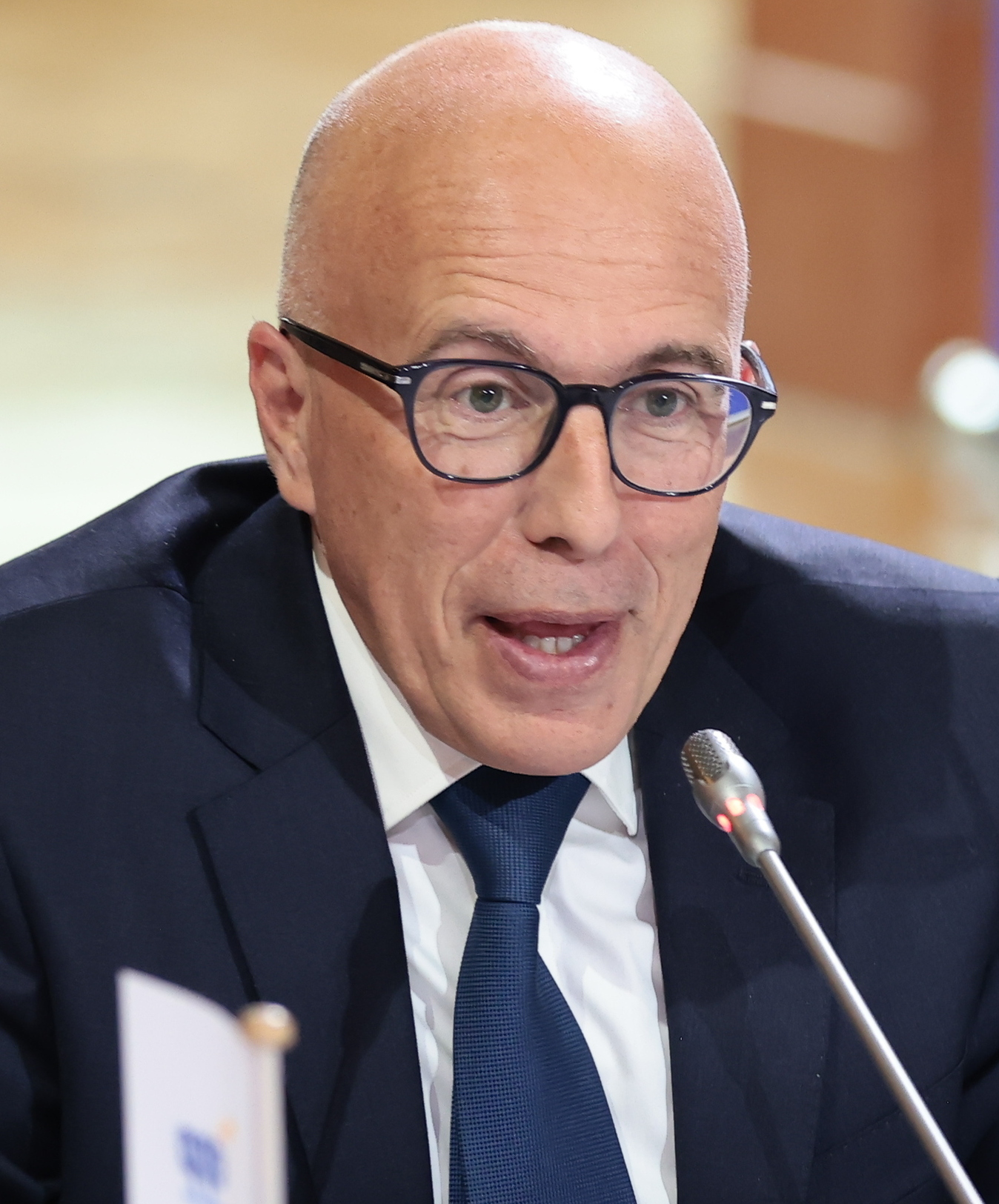
Éric Ciotti, president of The Republicans

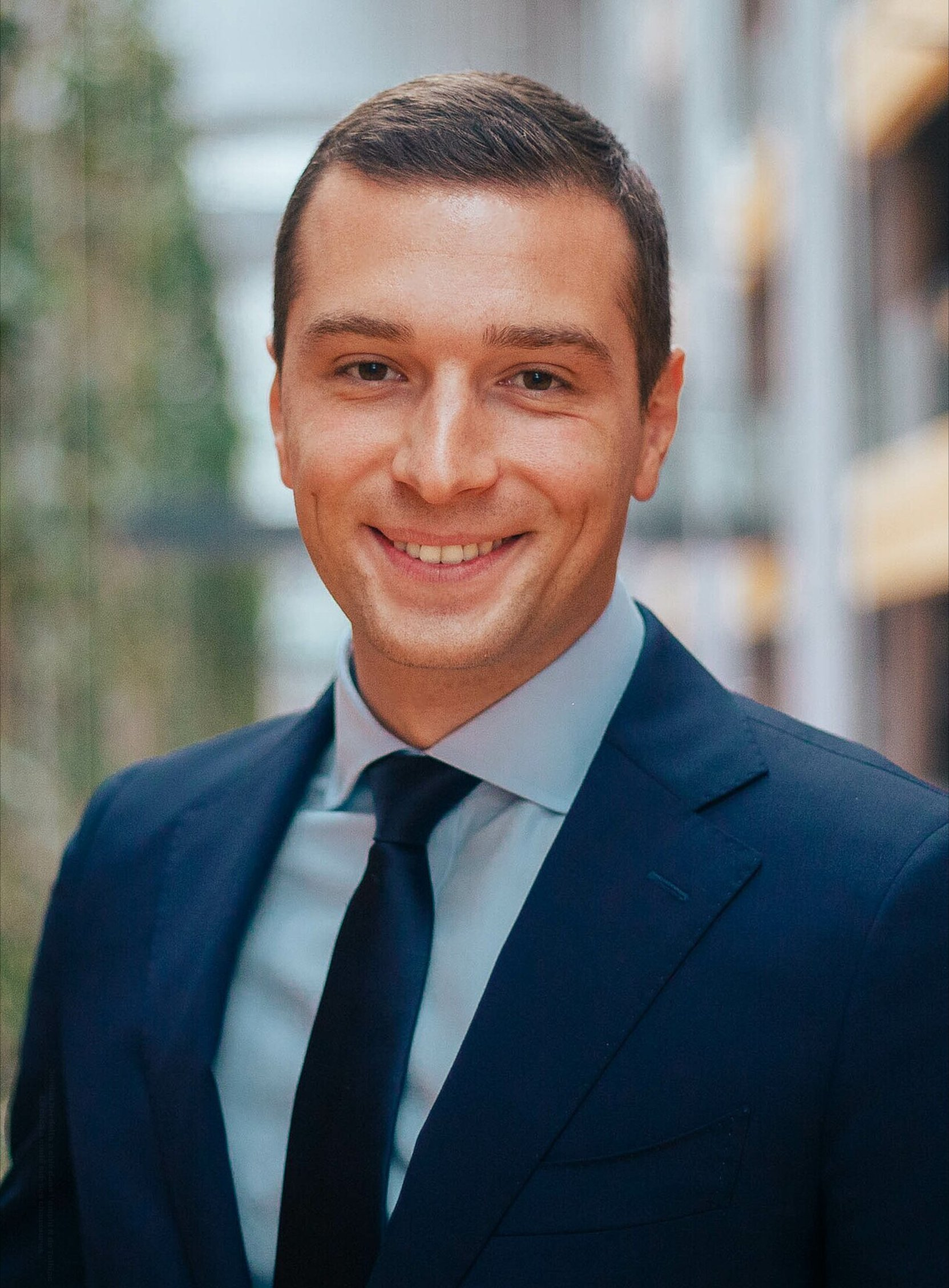
Jordan Bardella, president of the National Rally

In 2024, a dispute within the French right-wing party the Republicans (LR) stemmed from an alliance between its president Éric Ciotti and the far-right party National Rally (RN) for the snap legislative elections earlier that year, which were called after President Emmanuel Macron dissolved the French National Assembly. Initially intended to cover "between 70 and 80" constituencies, the alliance materialized in 61 constituencies, including two incumbent LR deputies.

Described as a political revolution by the LR president and a thunderclap by the media, this move was contested by 700 members of LR's national council, who took legal action, and nearly all of its deputies and senators. The LR political bureau unanimously voted to expel Éric Ciotti, accusing him of conducting secret negotiations without consulting his political family or activists and violating party statutes. Ciotti, however, disputed this expulsion. This marked the first time a major party, if its legal bodies validated the plan, would enter a national coalition with the National Rally, breaking the traditional Republican front against the far right.

The crisis led to the nomination of two groups of candidates, both claiming to represent The Republicans, often in the same constituencies. On one side, Éric Ciotti endorsed around 60 candidates, half of whom were not LR members, and urged support for RN candidates in other constituencies. The Ministry of the Interior classified them under the Union of the Far Right label. On the other side, the party's nomination committee endorsed 400 candidates, including all incumbent deputies except Éric Ciotti and Christelle D'Intorni.

Two deputies were elected in the first round: Christelle D'Intorni from the RN alliance and Philippe Juvin for The Republicans, with only 56 LR candidates qualifying for the second round. In the second round, sixteen additional candidates backed by Ciotti and the RN were elected, surpassing the minimum of fifteen deputies required to form a parliamentary group in the National Assembly. These seventeen deputies formed a separate group in the Seventeenth Legislature of the Fifth Republic, named "To the Right!". The Republicans, meanwhile, secured thirty-nine deputies.

On 31 August 2024, with the party's crisis still unresolved, Éric Ciotti founded the "Union of the Right for the Republic", echoing the former Gaullist party Union of Democrats for the Republic (UDR). On 22 September 2024, he announced his departure from The Republicans, leaving the party presidency vacant as of 30 September 2024. Days earlier, for the first time in over a decade, The Republicans returned to power, joining the government of Michel Barnier, which allocated twelve ministerial positions to them.

On 15 October 2024, LR's political bureau unanimously appointed a collective leadership comprising Annie Genevard (secretary general), François-Xavier Bellamy (executive vice-president), Michèle Tabarot (president of the National Nomination Committee), and Daniel Fasquelle (national treasurer). This team managed the party until a new president, Bruno Retailleau, was elected in 2025. The bureau also unanimously tasked Laurent Wauquiez, president of the Republican Right group in the National Assembly, with laying the groundwork for the party's renewal (ideas, name, organization).

== Background ==
=== Ciotti and the 2022 presidential election ===
Éric Ciotti, an unsuccessful candidate in The Republicans' primary before the 2022 presidential election, was accused of not supporting primary winner Valérie Pécresse, preferring a right-wing candidate Éric Zemmour, a candidate in the presidential election for Reconquête, supported by billionaire businessman Vincent Bolloré.

On 26 July 2022, Ciotti announced his candidacy for the Republican leadership election in December 2022. He obtained 42.73% of the vote, ahead of Bruno Retailleau and Aurélien Pradié, and gained the support of 140 elected officials including Laurent Wauquiez and Nadine Morano.

=== Schism in the midst of the 2023 pension reform ===
After the presentation of the pension reform law, Pradié was demoted. In its 18 February 2023 discussion, Ciotti dismissed him, judging his positions against party values, worrying that his party alienated popular voter blocs. Seven LR managers wrote to Ciotti criticizing this dismissal and asking for a meeting before any further meetings at headquarters.

Because the bill was via article 49.3 of the constitution, a third of Republican MPs disobeyed Ciotti and Retailleau by voting for a bipartisan no confidence motion on 20 March.

=== 2024 European elections ===
In the 2024 European Parliament election in France, the decline of the LR vote was reflected by François-Xavier Bellamy obtaining 7.2%, after Valérie Pécresse only obtained 4.78% in the 2022 presidential election. The repeated underperformance questioned the party's future.

== Development ==
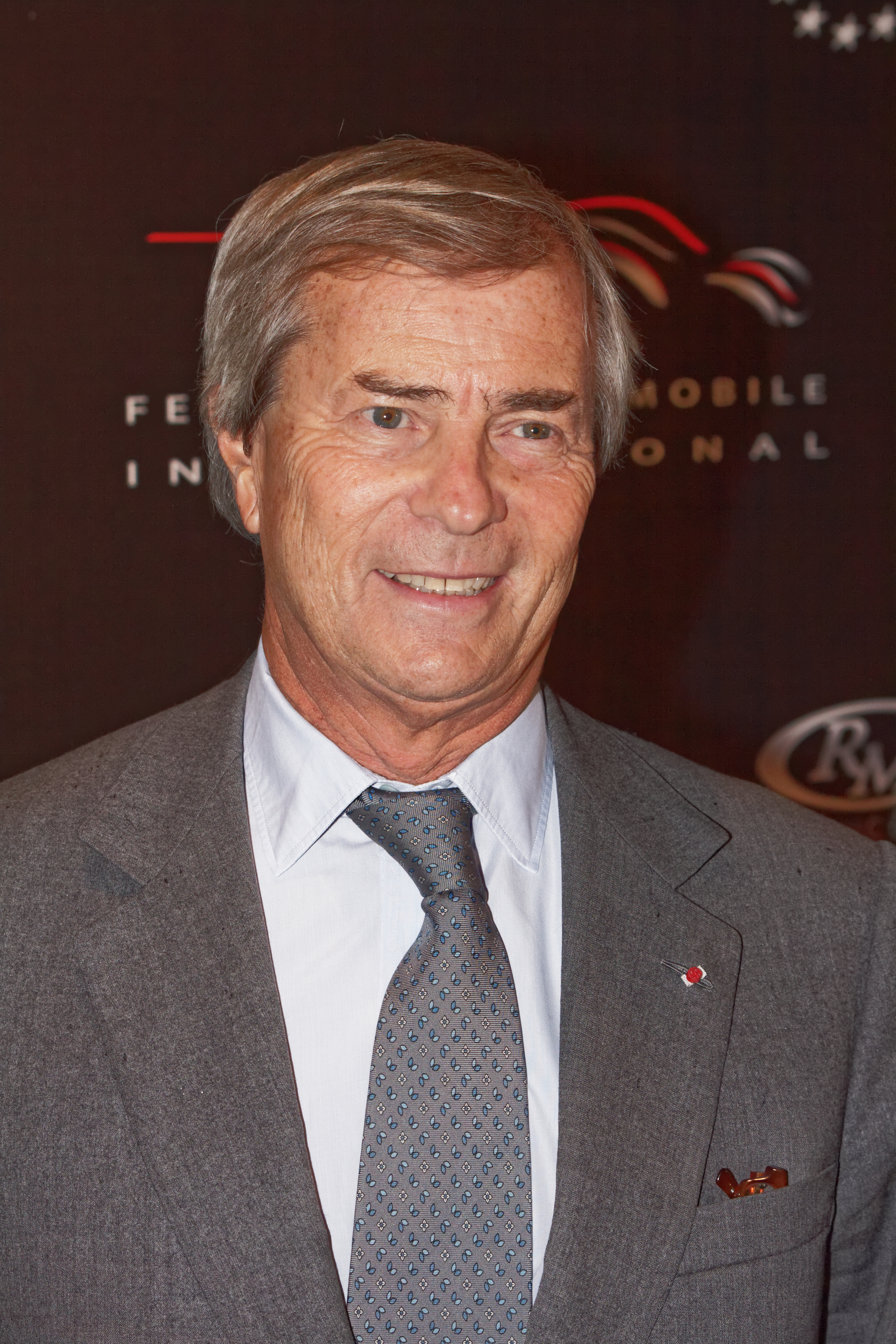
Vincent Bolloré (2014).

=== Preparation and announcement of the alliance project ===
On Tuesday, 11 June 2024, two days after the dissolution of the National Assembly, and with candidate lists for the snap legislative elections due within the week, Éric Ciotti announced in a televised interview that The Republicans would form an alliance with the National Rally, France's main far-right party. This event was orchestad by Vincent Bolloré’s media outlets. The day before, Bolloré finalized the organization at his media empire's headquarters with Éric Ciotti, without informing or consulting his party's elected officials or national council. This alliance had been desired for months by Vincent Bolloré, who had outlined the possibility to journalists outlined the possibility to journalists and editors in his group and met Ciotti each summer for years at his home in Saint-Tropez, where they frequently dined.

One of Bolloré's close associates, CNews presenter Pascal Praud, was directly informed by the Élysée Palace of the dissolution three hours before its announcement, ahead of Gabriel Attal and the government. However, he did not mention it on air.

The creation of this national right-wing bloc against the New Popular Front and Ensemble was welcomed by Marine Le Pen, Jordan Bardella, and Guilhem Carayon, president of the Young Republicans youth movement. President Emmanuel Macron described the project as a pact with the devil during a press conference.

The project received support from Guy Drut, a gold medalist in the 110-meter hurdles at the 1976 Summer Olympics.

=== Battle for LR's social media accounts ===
Citing received threats and disorder, Éric Ciotti responded to the expulsion attempt by closing the party headquarters, locking himself inside after giving staff 10 minutes (600 s) to leave. This allowed him sole access to The Republicans' Facebook profile, which remained in his hands. He filmed himself alone in his office at the headquarters to emphasize his dissent, staging a video shared on social media. However, he faced a password change on X (formerly Twitter), preventing access to the party's official account.

Using his control of the party's Facebook account, on 11 June, Éric Ciotti and Vincent Bolloré launched a petition to support the union of the right, deemed "manifestly illicit" by digital law expert Alexandre Archambault due to a lack of clarity on personal data usage.

=== Calls for Resignation ===
"The position expressed by Éric Ciotti is a dead end, does not represent our political family, and in no way reflects The Republicans' line," stated a column in Le Figaro signed by Bruno Retailleau, Laurent Wauquiez, Valérie Pécresse, Michèle Tabarot, Annie Genevard, François Baroin, Christian Jacob, and Michel Barnier. Other signatories, including Gérard Larcher, LR Senate president, and Olivier Marleix, LR parliamentary group president, called for Éric Ciotti's resignation. Ciotti responded with a surreal confrontation on social media with the rest of his political family. CNews journalist Gauthier Le Bret claimed that Gérard Larcher was negotiating an agreement with the presidential majority, which Larcher immediately denied.

=== Simultaneous Alignment with Jordan Bardella by Reconquête Leaders ===
The alignment with Jordan Bardella of the RN coincided with that of leaders from the Reconquête party. Sarah Knafo was invited alongside Sébastien Chenu and Éric Ciotti to the show "Touche pas à mon poste !" on C8, where host Cyril Hanouna asked her to answer a live call from Jordan Bardella in front of over 2 million viewers. The three vice-presidents of Reconquête (Marion Maréchal, Guillaume Peltier, and Nicolas Bay), along with Laurence Trochu, representing four of its five MEPs, called for support for the RN-Éric Ciotti electoral alliance, despite no formal party agreement and in opposition to Éric Zemmour's stance. Éric Zemmour denounced this as a betrayal and announced their expulsion.

=== Involvement of Vincent Bolloré's Media Group in the Campaign ===
On CNews, Pascal Praud criticized and excluded LR elected officials who disagreed with Éric Ciotti, caricaturing them as so out of touch with reality when they denounce the fascist danger. Vincent Bolloré's media group engaged in the campaign like a true political party, aiming to "save soldier Ciotti", a tactic with "parallels" to that of Alfred Hugenberg, a steel and media magnate in Germany in the 1930s, according to Nobel Prize in Economics laureate Esther Duflo. Several regional presidents, such as Xavier Bertrand, Valérie Pécresse, and Laurent Wauquiez, demanded Éric Ciotti's expulsion, with Bertrand describing the RN alliance as a "betrayal" and also calling for the expulsion of LR deputies supported or endorsed by the RN.

=== Expulsion of Éric Ciotti and Legal Proceedings ===
On 13 June, unable to access the locked headquarters, The Republicans’ political bureau met in a nearby building, where it unanimously voted to expel Éric Ciotti, labeled a "traitor," and tasked Annie Genevard, François-Xavier Bellamy, and treasurer Daniel Fasquelle with interim leadership. Ciotti's expulsion was reaffirmed on 14 June via an online meeting to "strengthen the legal basis for the expulsion" with the support of LR's national councilors. Both expulsions were challenged in court through an urgent procedure. The court ruled that the substantive jurisdiction must be seized "within eight days" by "the most diligent party," with the temporary suspension of the expulsion becoming void after this period. These "legal aspects" stemmed from differing interpretations of the party's statutes regarding the president's contested monopoly on convening bodies. On 26 June, the court rejected Ciotti's expulsion a third time.

=== Call by 700 National Council Members for a Third Expulsion ===
On 18 June, an internal source acknowledged that the votes on 12 and 14 June were legally weak, lacking evidence of national council support. The bureau then gathered signatures from approximately 700 of the 2,300 LR national council members, "more than enough to request in writing, under Article 24.3 of the statutes, that Éric Ciotti convene a political bureau" to expel him. The internal regulations gave him eight days, until midnight on 26 June 2024, to comply. After this deadline passed, the national council members sought judicial appointment of an ad hoc representative to convene the bureau. However, the Paris Judicial Court rejected this request, effectively confirming Éric Ciotti as party president.

=== Poll Among LR Sympathizers ===
In June 2024, a poll indicated that half of LR "sympathizers" approved of Éric Ciotti's alliance with the RN, though it provided no details on the scope or definition of "sympathizers".

=== Statements by Aurélien Pradié of The Republicans ===
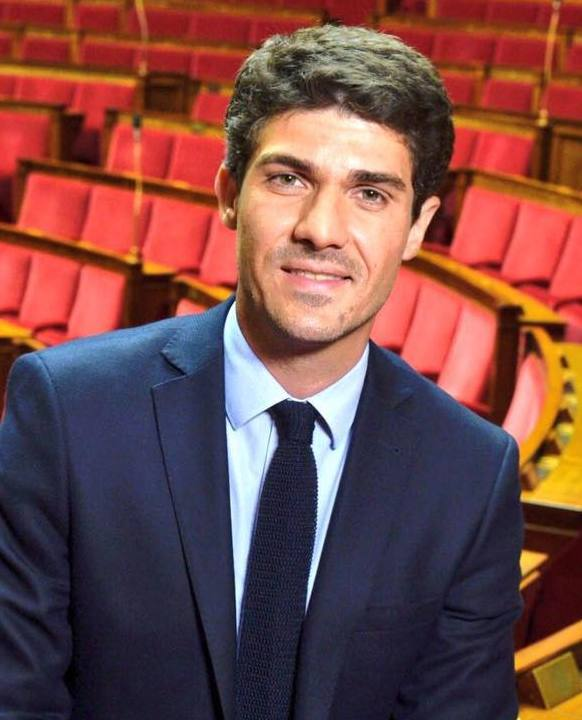
Aurélien Pradié (2017).

Aurélien Pradié, outgoing deputy for the Lot, and number two in the party until February 2023, announced his departure from The Republicans on 26 June, four days before the snap legislative elections, in an interview with La Dépêche du Midi. The day after Éric Ciotti's alignment with the RN, he had expressed his urge to vomit and was one of the harshest critics, stating that Ciotti had "betrayed the right", even suggesting he should be "forcibly removed from de Gaulle's office". Concerned that the name "The Republicans" was worn out and damaged by someone who, during the pension reform, was the crutch of Macronism, Pradié ran under the banner of his micro-party, "Du Courage". "We are thirty candidates, including ten incumbents, in France who are not aligned with LR led by Éric Ciotti" but with this party, which is "a seed for the future," he declared. He clarified, however, that he had not returned his Republicans membership card and was not opposed to voting for RN-proposed bills: "when they align with the country's interests, as I have always done, particularly on immigration." Pierre-Henri Dumont supported his stance.

=== Candidates in the legislative elections ===
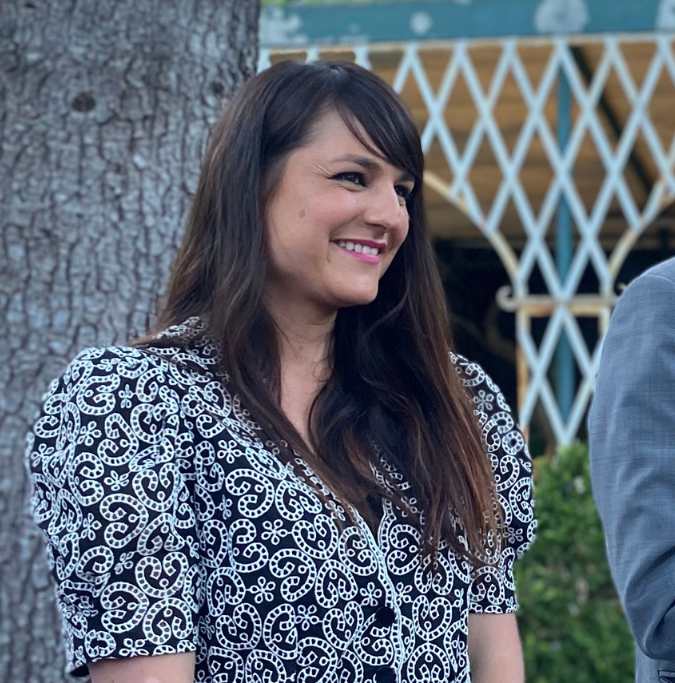
Christelle D'Intorni (2022).

==== Candidates supported by Ciotti ====
Jordan Bardella and Éric Ciotti announced two days after the European elections that "several dozen" The Republicans (LR) deputies would be "supported" through this "agreement" without specifying names. Two days later, the press revealed that, among the 61 incumbent LR deputies, only Christelle D'Intorni and Ciotti were included. Ciotti later named European deputies Céline Imart and Christophe Gomart, but Imart later distanced herself.

Éric Ciotti ultimately endorsed 61 candidates, creating confusion with the number of incumbent LR deputies. Only half were LR members. Among them were "some former deputies" such as Brigitte Barèges (Montauban), Gilles Bourdouleix (Cholet), and Jacques Myard (Maisons-Laffitte), but "few well-known elected officials," except Sébastien Meurant, a former Val-d'Oise senator expelled from LR after supporting Éric Zemmour in 2022 and linked to a Russian influence operation according to Complément d'enquête. Their names were revealed by the press the day after the candidacy filing deadline.

Among them were "many former supporters" of Éric Zemmour, as well as "allies of Marion Maréchal, CNews commentators, a French spokesperson for Donald Trump," Typhanie Degois, a Macronist deputy until 2022, then a lobbyist for billionaire Pierre-Édouard Stérin, and "many" candidates parachuted from Paris, including lawyers, dentists, and François Fèvre, former communications director for Robert Ménard in Béziers, who later headed the radio station RCF Sarthe. The group included 17.5% women, resulting in fines under the law promoting equal access for women and men to electoral mandates. On 19 June 2024, the alliance withdrew support from two candidates after "the revelation of antisemitic, racist, or homophobic social media posts":

- Jean-Pierre Templier, running mate of Anthony Zeller in Loiret, was targeted by a complaint from deputy Richard Ramos (MoDem) for writing about the Jewish community: "this community leads us, how many are in the government, at the head of CAC 40 companies."
- Louis-Joseph Pecher in Meurthe-et-Moselle (Gannat) for racist, homophobic, and antisemitic remarks.

Sébastien Laye, a Franco-American entrepreneur, financier, and journalist, was endorsed in the 10th constituency of Hauts-de-Seine against Gabriel Attal. Éric Ciotti faced LR candidate Virgile Vanier-Guérin in the 1st constituency of Alpes-Maritimes. Christelle D'Intorni, running in the 5th constituency of Alpes-Maritimes, and Ciotti refused invitations from local media to debate their opponents, prompting outrage, leading BFM Nice to cancel its broadcasts and France 3 to abandon a debate.

The alliance's candidate in the 4th constituency of Essonne, Jérôme Carbriand, was criticized by L'Humanité for antisemitic and homophobic remarks on a now-deleted blog. The candidate in the 7th constituency of Yvelines, Babette de Rozières, was criticized by Libération for repeating the antisemitic trope of "Jewish slavers."

==== Candidates Endorsed by The Republicans' National Nomination Committee ====
The Republicans' National Nomination Committee (CNI) endorsed only 400 candidates, compared to 457 in 2022. "Finding candidates in one week, amidst the chaos caused by Éric Ciotti, with the legal questions that arose, did not make our task any easier!" explained Philippe Dallier, LR mayor of Les Pavillons-sous-Bois (Seine-Saint-Denis). Dallier The list was only revealed by the CNI on the evening of 16 June, the official candidacy filing deadline. Dallier In Haute-Garonne, out of seven proposed candidates, "only two decided to run," with others deterred by Éric Ciotti's legal challenges, according to federation president Christine Gennaro-Saint.

Among the 400 candidates, 59 of the 61 incumbent deputies were endorsed, excluding only Éric Ciotti and Christelle D'Intorni. Dallier LR lacked time to ally with Union of Democrats and Independents (UDI) candidates in constituencies where it is less established, unlike in 2022.

== Second round Qualifiers ==
Of the 61 candidates presented by the "Friends of Éric Ciotti" group, supported by the National Rally (RN) in the first round, 50 qualified for the second round, with 25 potentially electable, according to the liberal newspaper L'Opinion. A more cautious Ipsos projection published on 5 July 2024, estimated 18 to 24 deputies from these 50 qualifiers, though pollsters remained cautious due to the high number of competitive constituencies.

Among them, Guilhem Carayon, head of the Young Republicans, secured 43.51% of the votes in the 4th constituency of Tarn, where the RN had only garnered 35% in the European elections. Carayon His father, Bernard Carayon, had been elected there from 1993 to 1997 and 2002 to 2012 under the Rally for the Republic (RPR) and Union for a Popular Movement (UMP) banners. Carayon Éric Ciotti secured 40% in his constituency, while Philippe Torre, in the 2nd constituency of Aisne, approached 50%.

The 400 LR candidates loyal to the party's political bureau were present in 51-second-round duels, plus 14 "other right" candidates, and in 8 triangular races, alongside 6 "other right" candidates, totaling 77 constituencies. Franceinfo However, they led in only 20 metropolitan constituencies, though they dominated in all constituencies in Cantal and Haute-Loire.

The media highlighted the endorsement of Astrid Panoysan-Bouvet (formerly Renaissance (French political party), in Paris's 17th arrondissement, where LR mayor Geoffroy Boulard faced journalist Arnaud Dassier, son of former TF1 executive Jean-Claude Dassier and co-founder of Avisa Partners, who had led Nicolas Sarkozy's 2007 digital campaign. Only two deputies from the two factions involved in this crisis were elected in the first round: Christelle D'Intorni from the RN alliance and Philippe Juvin for the "historic" LR faction.

== Withdrawals, Blank Votes, and Xavier Bertrand's Exclusion Procedure ==
The Republicans, having fielded only 400 candidates, with 56 qualifying for the second round, issued no general voting instructions for the second round, where they were present in 36 triangular races, including 29 against the RN and only 3 against the left, but made case-by-case statements. Senate LR president Gérard Larcher announced support for Aurore Bergé, a key figure in the president's party, who led in Yvelines, against the RN candidate. LR senator Marc-Philippe Daubresse from Nord department stated he would vote blank in "a duel between an LFI and an RN candidate," LarcherDaubresse while party vice-president François-Xavier Bellamy refused to join a Republican front against the RN, arguing that the danger was "the extreme left."

On France 2's program "Les 4 vérités," Éric Ciotti announced his intention to initiate an "exclusion procedure" from LR against Xavier Bertrand.

== Analysis ==
This crisis, considered a betrayal by the Gaullist party's "heavyweights" but presented as a "political revolution" by Éric Ciotti, marked the first time a major party's political bureau expelled its president, in what the press called an "astonishing vaudeville."

According to Gilles Richard, a professor of contemporary history, the crisis's roots lie in Emmanuel Macron's election on a "liberal and pro-European line," which "shattered LR's balance," with some members moving closer to the National Rally (FN) in 2018. He argued that LR "should have decided" between its two internal factions, as following Éric Ciotti would make it "a satellite of the RN, without real autonomy," while aligning with Macron's right wing would leave it "a relatively marginal satellite party."

With no other political group likely to join the RN and its LR allies like Éric Ciotti, France is "heading straight toward a regime crisis," according to political scientist Virginie Martin, a professor and researcher at Kedge Business School. Éric Ciotti denounced the Ministry of the Interior's classification of his 63 candidates as "Union of the Far Right" as a "low maneuver by Macron’s camp to destabilize our candidates and voters," calling it "an unprecedented democratic scandal."

The crisis was humorously dubbed the "Prince of LR, aka Éric Ciotti series" by Politico Europe and "telenovela Los Republicanos" by 20 Minutes (France).
