= Julien Aubert =

French politician (born 1978)

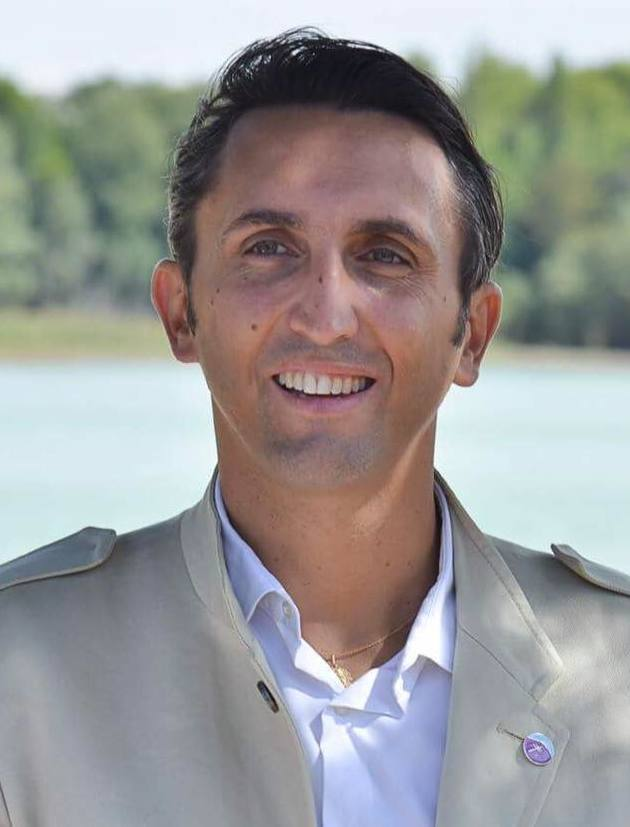
- Aubert in 2017

Member of the National Assembly for Vaucluse's 5th constituency
- In office 20 June 2012 – June 2022
- Preceded by: Constituency established
- Succeeded by: Jean-François Lovisolo

Personal details
- Born: 11 June 1978 (age 48) Marseille, France
- Party: The Republicans (2017–present)
- Other political affiliations: Rally for the Republic (until 2002); Union for a Popular Movement (2002–2015)
- Education: Sciences Po; Johns Hopkins University; École nationale d'administration
- Occupation: Civil servant

Julien Aubert (French pronunciation: [ʒyljɛ̃ obɛːʁ]; born 11 June 1978) is a French politician and civil servant who represented the 5th constituency of the Vaucluse department in the National Assembly from 2012 to 2022. A member of The Republicans (LR) and its predecessor parties, he ran for the party's leadership in the 2019 election, in which he placed second behind Christian Jacob. In 2017, Aubert launched his own political movement and think tank, Oser la France (Dare France).

== Political career ==
A magistrate at the Court of Audit by occupation, Aubert was elected to Parliament in the 2012 legislative election for the newly-created 5th constituency of Vaucluse. Following the 2015 regional election, he was also inaugurated as a regional councillor of Provence-Alpes-Côte d'Azur. He served one term in the Regional Council of Provence-Alpes-Côte d'Azur until 27 June 2021. Aubert held one of the council's vice presidencies from 13 December 2015 to 18 June 2017 under Christian Estrosi and Renaud Muselier.

Aubert served as deputy secretary-general of The Republicans from 13 December 2017 to 23 October 2019 under the leadership of Laurent Wauquiez. He placed second in the 2019 The Republicans leadership election, in which he ran to the right of winner Christian Jacob.

He lost his seat in the 2022 French legislative election to Jean-François Lovisolo of Ensemble.
