= Murder of Philippine Le Noir de Carlan =

2024 homicide case in France

- Her plaque
- Born: 10 October 2004; Clamart, Paris
- Died: 20 September 2024 (aged 19); Paris, France
- Cause of death: Murder

On 21 September 2024, the body of 19-year-old French woman Philippine Le Noir de Carlan (born 10 October 2004), was discovered in the Bois de Boulogne in Paris.The prime suspect, Taha Oualidat, was arrested in Switzerland on 24 September.As he is in the country illegally, he is being extradited for possible indictment for rape followed by murder.

The case has sparked numerous media and political reactions within France, particularly with questions raised about the monitoring of people convicted of rape, the removal of people subject to an OQTF, the legal criteria allowing the judge to extend the administrative detention of an illegal immigrant and the issue of "double penalty", that is, sentencing someone to be deported to their country of origin in addition to the penal sanctions.

== Background ==
Philippine Le Noir de Carlan was born in Clamart on 10 October 2004 to a Catholic family of six children. The Le Noir de Carlan family belongs to the surviving French nobility of the Ancien Régime. The family originally hails from Brittany (Côtes-d'Armor) and was established as noble in 1669.

Philippine's mother is a mathematics teacher and her father is a physicist for the French Alternative Energies and Atomic Energy Commission.

Philippine attended a private Catholic high school before starting a degree in economics and financial engineering at Paris Dauphine University. She was a scout leader and had been involved in the Scouts and Guides of France movement since childhood. A Catholic, she regularly attended the church of Saint-Pierre-du-Lac in Montigny-le-Bretonneux. By 2024, she lived in the 16th arrondissement of Paris in an apartment on Boulevard Lannes next to her university and regularly travelled home to her family in Montigny-le-Bretonneux.

== Events ==
After her lunch at the Paris Dauphine University canteen on 20 September, Philippine Le Noir de Carlan was supposed to go to her parents' house in Yvelines. According to the missing person report, she was last seen at 2 p.m. When her relatives did not see her arrive, they attempted to contact her to no avail. That same evening, around 11 p.m., a relative of Philippine went to the police station in the 16th arrondissement of Paris. As procedure, an investigation into an urgent disappearance was opened. Her relatives then tried to geolocate the mobile phone, which was in the area of the Bois de Boulogne park.

A close friend of Philippine contacted Priscillia Routier-Trillard, founder of the mobile app The Sorority, who activated an alarm to signal danger and was responsible for relaying a missing person notice to the app's network. The founder estimated to Le Parisien that "between our app, our social networks and emails, 300,000 people received the missing person notice. With the shares, we reached nearly a million Internet users.

At the family's request, around 50 people mobilized and organized a search for Philippine in the Bois de Boulogne in the afternoon of 21 September. The search party found the student's cell phone, and, about 20 meters away, abnormal shapes in the earth. Philippine's body was found partially buried. A security perimeter was then set up by the police. Investigators and scientific experts tried to collect as many clues as possible on site.

The medical examiners concluded that the cause of death was asphyxiation without strangulation.

The funeral was held on 27 September at the Versailles Cathedral, by Abbot Pierre-Hervé Grosjean. Around 1,800 people were present inside the cathedral with another 1,000 on the parvise.

== Tributes ==
On 23 September, the Paris Dauphine University community gathered in large numbers to pay tribute to Philippine Le Noir de Carlan, by observing a minute of silence in her memory. The president of the university, El-Mouhoub Mouhoud, expressed his full support to her family, her loved ones and her classmates.

Hanane Mansouri, a member of parliament belonging to the right-wing Union of the Right for the Republic party, organised a rally in tribute to Philippine in front of the Vienne courthouse in Isère. The rally was disrupted by a group of activists, including teachers, candidates for parliament, human rights activists, psychologists, and parliamentary assistant, who came to denounce "political recovery" by chanting the slogan "Siamo Tutti Antifascisti" (English: "We are all antifascists"). Coverage of the event resulted in three people, citizens or members of the New Popular Front, being targeted with online harassment, each of whom filed a complaint at the police station.

On 1 October 2024, a minute of silence was observed by the French National Assembly.

== Legal proceedings ==
=== Police investigation and judicial instruction ===
The media and political controversy sparked by the event overshadowed the speed of an investigation described by a judicial source as a "masterpiece of investigation". Without a genetic fingerprint at the crime scene, the Criminal Brigade turned to other leads and managed to isolate several decisive time sequences by analysing telephone traffic in the Bois de Boulogne district and Seine-Saint-Denis, where a cash withdrawal from an ATM in Montreuil was made with the victim's bank card. Thousands of pieces of data were then cross-referenced to identify the profile of a suspect, in particular through the use of video surveillance images from the bank where he made the withdrawal. The 22-year-old Moroccan suspect was arrested at Genève-Cornavin railway station in Geneva on 24 September 2024.

On 24 September, an investigating judge was put in charge of the investigation regarding the homicide and rape of Le Noir de Carlan. The judicial investigation covers in particular the offences of murder preceded, accompanied or followed by other crimes; rape, theft and fraud, all in a state of legal recidivism.

A crime scene reenactment is being carried out in the Bois de Boulogne, featuring the perpetrator escorted by police officers.

=== Extradition ===
Since Switzerland is not a member of the European Union, the simplicity of the European Arrest Warrant did not apply in this specific case, and so an extradition request that complies with the requirements of Swiss law must be made. France and Switzerland are both parties to the European Convention on Extradition of 13 December 1957. This cooperation was increased on 10 February 2003 with the Agreement between France and Switzerland on the simplified extradition procedure. This agreement, ratified by the law of 13 October 2005, strengthened the extradition procedure between the two countries by allowing for the use of a simplified procedure, subject to the acceptance of the person targeted by the extradition. Thus, two extradition procedures coexist between France and Switzerland: a normal procedure and a simplified procedure.

France made the request on 9 October 2024 to the Swiss authorities for the extradition of the suspect on suspicion of the murder of Philippine Le Noir de Carlan in Paris on 20 September.

For this to have been made possible, the alleged offences must be punishable by law in both France and Switzerland, and in particular the facts must be punishable in each country by a custodial sentence or at a minimum a custodial security measure of at least two years, which was the case here for rape and murder. But the incrimination must not be based on a political motive, nor must the person be a Swiss national. If these conditions are met, extradition times can vary, according to Maître Philippe Fontana, a lawyer at the Paris bar: "Either there is a classic procedure and given the media coverage of the case, it will only take a few weeks. Or there is a simplified extradition procedure and then it is a matter of only one month. Finally, if the person in question contests his extradition, it will take several months".

During a hearing by a Geneva prosecutor on 16 October 2024, the suspect refused his extradition by simplified procedure. The Swiss Federal Office of Justice received the content of this hearing planned on making a decision on the extradition in the following days. The suspect then had eight days to file an administrative appeal. In this case, the procedure could have taken "several weeks or even several months", but he was handed over to the French authorities on 6 November in Annemasse in Haute-Savoie, on the France–Switzerland border.

== Suspect ==
=== Judicial history ===
According to information transmitted by the BFMTV police service, the suspect was born in 2002 in Oujda, Morocco, and entered France in June 2019 via Spain at the age of 17 with a tourist visa. Shortly after his arrival, he was taken into care by the child welfare service in Val-d'Oise. In September 2019, he raped a 23-year-old student in Taverny. Identified through his DNA, he was arrested and placed in pre-trial detention. On October 5, 2021, he was sentenced by the Val-d'Oise juvenile assize court to seven years in prison for this rape, a reduced sentence because he was a minor at the time of the events. He was detained from 2019 and released at the end of his sentence in June 2024. On 18 June 2024, in an irregular situation in France since he had only entered the national territory with a three-month short-stay visa, he was notified of an obligation to leave French territory (OQTF) with a ten-year ban on returning. The same day, the French administration requested a consular pass (LPC) to Morocco. Upon his release from prison, he was placed in the administrative detention center (CRA) in Metz. His placement was extended three times. On 3 September, a judge of liberties and detention orders his release from the detention center. Before his release, the administration notifies him of a house arrest in a hotel located in Yonne, accompanied by an obligation to check in so that he does not attempt to evade the surveillance of the administration and the execution of his removal from the territory. Two weeks later, the 19 September 2024, he was entered in the file of persons wanted by the prefectural services because he did not respect his obligation to report. The murder of Philippine Le Noir de Carlan occurred the following day on 20 September.

=== Culpability of the legal system ===
Questions over whether the murder of Philippine Le Noir de Carlan was avoidable, and whether dysfunctions in the legal system and administrative state led to the suspect's release and allowed the crime to take place, have been raised by many politicians and citizens. In an interview with Le Figaro on 2 October 2024, Minister of the Interior Bruno Retailleau stated that there were clearly dysfunctions, which are not new and which are recurring and that he asked the general inspection of his administration to take stock of this issue.

While some legal professionals such as Stéphane Maugendre (a lawyer specializing in immigration law ) and Olivier Cahn (a professor of French criminal law) believe that the legislative tools in force are sufficient. Others such as Béatrice Brugère, general secretary of the Unité Magistrats union, believe that in France, it is impossible to expel a foreign minor "even if he or she has committed crimes". At the same time, several political leaders, from both the right and the left, are questioning the criminal and administrative chain and certain dysfunctions. Five phases may raise questions: the execution of the sentence, how to prevent recidivism, why the suspect was not returned to the border after serving the sentence, consular passes and leaving the detention center. In the case of the suspect, the law was applied unevenly, in some cases being applied simply and other cases in a stricter interpretation.

==== Reduced sentence ====
Sentences served in French prisons are almost always shorter than those handed down at the time of conviction, due to the existence of sentence reduction credits (CRP), defined by Article 721 of the Code of Criminal Procedure. The version in force from 30 December 2019 to 24 December 2021 of this article, which would have applied to the suspect, was worded as follows: "Each convicted person benefits from a sentence reduction credit calculated on the length of the sentence handed down at a rate of three months for the first year, two months for the following years". This system was relaxed with Law No. 2021-1729 of December 22, 2021, stipulating that a sentence reduction may be granted by the judge responsible for the enforcement of sentences, after consulting the Sentence Enforcement Commission, to convicts serving one or more custodial sentences who have provided sufficient evidence of good conduct and who have demonstrated serious efforts at rehabilitation. These provisions of the 2021 law introducing the subjection of sentence reductions to good conduct are only applicable to persons placed in custody as of 1 January 2023.

==== Preventing recurrence ====
On 30 September 2024, lawyer Cécile De Oliveira explained on France Info that the law provides access to psychiatric and sometimes psychological care for prisoners both before and after their trial. However, prison overcrowding calls into question "the effectiveness of access to care". If prisoners are "rather in high demand", the "resources of hospital psychiatry mean that we have to limit the number of meetings" with caregivers. She points out the same problem with "probation services", which work to integrate prisoners.

==== Legal residency status within France ====
On 12 April 2021, the minister of the interior gave a memo to the prefects concerning foreigners without a residence permit. The memo read: "For foreigners in an irregular situation, during the period of detention, you will endeavour to take an appropriate removal measure: this measure will be intended to be executed when the detainee is released. To this end, you will take all preparatory measures for removal in advance (identification, routing), the objective being to be able to proceed with removal without prior detention". This clause was further supported by documentation on 3 August 2022 and 5 February 2024, which explained the new measures of the 2021 Asylum and immigration law. However, no provision was made upstream that would have allowed for deportation after serving the sentence. The order requiring the detainee to leave the territory with a ten-year ban on return was signed by the prefect of Yonne on 17 June and notified the following day, 18 June, two days before the detainee's release.

Olivier Faure noted in September 2024, on BFM TV: "When we have someone who is in detention, who...we can think of as a threat to French society, we should not have to release him before we even have the assurance that he will be able to leave... The consular pass that we had to collect from the Moroccan authorities should...already have been collected before even releasing him or detaining him, where the deadlines are in fact limited in time".

==== Moroccan consular pass ====
The prefect submitted a request for a consular pass for the suspect to the Moroccan consulate in Dijon on 18 June. The central department of the Ministry of the Interior, the DGEF, considered itself competent after the Moroccan authorities requested a referral and made a new request to the Moroccan authorities on 18 July 2024, thus causing a month's delay in the investigation. The taking of fingerprints, essential for the identification of the foreigner, was not requested from the gendarmes by the Prefecture services until 15 July, with a return the following day. The LPC was finally issued too late, on 4 September, the day after the suspect's release.

At a press conference in Rabat, Moroccan Foreign Minister Nasser Bourita stated that "Morocco is ready to repatriate any irregular migrant who is proven to be Moroccan and has left Moroccan territory." He also asked: "Morocco is ready, but is the other party capable of doing so?", believing that the Moroccan government did not "need to receive lessons" in the fight against illegal immigration. He specified that "there were clear directives for the Moroccan authorities to work with France and Spain to repatriate unaccompanied minors," believing that "the obstacles did not come from Morocco but from the procedures of these countries." He also criticized those in Europe who "make immigration a political business." Bruno Retailleau indicates, however, that in 2023, France issued 238,750 visas to Morocco, but obtained "only 725 laissez-passer".

==== Reasons for suspect's release ====
The decision and the maintenance of detention are defined by articles L741-1 to L741-5 of the Code of Entry and Residence of Foreigners and of the Right to Asylum. Provisions described as "absurd" and which "facilitate the release of illegal immigrants" by Morgane Daury-Fauveau, professor of private law, general secretary of the UNI and president of the Center for University Studies and Research (Ceru).

After the four-day detention, an initial authorisation from the Judge of liberties and detention (JLD) is required for an extension of 26 days. At the end of 30 days of detention, the JLD must be contacted for a second authorisation to extend for a further period of 30 days. Then, once this period has expired, Article L. 742-5 of the Code provides for a third extension, known as exceptional, of fifteen days this time and subject to three conditions, The third being worded as follows: "The removal decision could not be executed due to the failure to issue travel documents by the consulate to which the person concerned belongs and it has been established by the competent administrative authority that this issue must take place promptly. The judge may also be contacted in the event of absolute urgency or a threat to public order." Concerning the suspect, the three extensions were issued respectively on June 23, July 20 and August 19.

A fourth, even more exceptional, extension of fifteen days is provided for by the tenth and final paragraph of the same article L. 742–5, according to which: "If one of the circumstances mentioned in 1°, 2° or 3° or in the seventh paragraph of this article occurs during the exceptional extension ordered pursuant to the penultimate paragraph, it may be renewed once, under the same conditions. The maximum duration of the detention shall then not exceed ninety days". The seventh paragraph in question is the one relating to the threat to public order. For the fourth extension, the threat to public order must therefore have appeared during the last fifteen days, according to a strict interpretation of the code. Thus, since the suspect did not show the slightest threat during his detention and no information was received concerning the travel documents, the judge of liberties and detention released him 15 days before the legal end of the 90-day period, while recognising the dangerousness of the individual in the drafting of the order refusing the extension.

=== Bois de Boulogne security ===
Le Noir de Carlan's death has brought the issue of security in the Bois de Boulogne back into the spotlight. A place of prostitution, particularly that of sex workers from South America, this space attracts a marginalized population, generating delinquency that mixes theft, assault and drug use. The most high-profile recent criminal cases are the death of Vanesa Campos in August 2018 and the arrest in April 2024 of "El Indiano" suspected of a hundred rapes of prostitutes. Jérémy Redler, mayor (LR) of the 16th arrondissement of Paris, thus called for the "creation of a dedicated and armed municipal police brigade, to deal with the dangerousness of the individuals who may be there".

The Paris Police Prefecture specified that "beyond the strong action of the district's personnel who deploy daily foot and vehicle patrols, departmental units of the Paris metropolitan area's local security department (DSPAP) are also regularly engaged". Republican guard riders also patrol the most densely populated areas. Prefect Laurent Nuñez has increased his force. The day after the tragedy, the Bois de Boulogne was cordoned off until 8:30 p.m. by uniformed units from the Public Order and Traffic Department with the support of the Paris intervention company and "hunters" from the night-time anti-crime brigade (Bac-N) tasked with carrying out "dynamic security" of the area until 6 a.m. The district staff, for their part, are now asked to ensure a "constant presence during the day by means of uniformed crews (Territorial Contact Brigade) in the Muette-Dauphine sector as well as on the contiguous edge of the Bois de Boulogne".

According to a report brought to the attention of Le Figaro, attacks on physical integrity in the Bois de Boulogne fell by 28.3% over the first eight months of 2024 compared to the same period of the previous year. The number of attacks fell from 53 to 38, knowing that they had already fallen by 42.39% in 2023 compared to 2022.

== Reactions ==
The reactions at both national and international levels, at political level and in the media and public opinion are such that this crime became a political story.

=== From the French government ===
On 26 September 2024, Emmanuel Macron, on a trip to Montreal in Quebec, Canada, expressed "the emotion of the entire nation" while denouncing a "heinous and atrocious crime", and believes that it is necessary "to better protect the French every day".

Members of the French Parliament and members of the government observed a minute of silence on 1 October 2024 in the National Assembly in tribute to the victim. The president of the National Assembly, Yaël Braun-Pivet said "No speech can make up for the loss of a child, but let them know that we are at their side in this terrible ordeal". The president of the Senate Gérard Larcher paid tribute the same day by declaring "I believe that the national representation must draw all the consequences from such a tragedy so that never again is a woman's life stolen in this way".

=== Political response ===
Sexual violence became an important issue in France in late 2024 due to this case and the Mazan rape trial of Dominique Pelicot for his abuse of his wife Gisèle Pelicot. The right wing was particularly interested in the murder and rape of Philippine, as it had been committed by a Moroccan national in an irregular situation on French soil. The left, for its part, opposed this interpretation by the political right, according to Jean Garrigues, a historian specializing in politics.

According to the latter, "political recovery" consists of a political camp using a social fact to promote its theses, its reading of the world and, why not, then gain electoral benefit from it. This practice historically comes from the extreme right, but it is now the work of all parties.

However, he distinguishes two types of political recovery: that of "confirmation" and that of "opposition". While the National Rally (RN) is part of the first which aims to affirm that illegal immigration constitutes a danger for France and to justify a generalizing and racist discourse, MP Sandrine Rousseau, is part of the second, by claiming her feminism, one of the political battles of which concerns the fight against femicides.

==== Far right: trials for “laxity” of justice and anti-immigration sentiment ====
Jordan Bardella, president of the National Rally (RN), castigates "irresponsible justice" and denounces "judicial laxity [which] has dramatic consequences on insecurity", making an appointment on 31 October at the National Assembly to examine a bill from his party proposing to systematize the expulsions of adult foreigners definitively convicted of a crime or an offense "punishable by a sentence of at least three years of imprisonment".

Accustomed to these recuperations, the spheres of the far-right identity are taking up the term "francocide", invented by the polemicist Éric Zemmour, and are organizing poster collages, using the same methods as after the murder of Lola Daviet, aged 12, killed in 2023 by an Algerian national who was also required to leave French territory. The identarian movement Collectif Némésis thus called for a demonstration on 29 September 2024 against violence against women and against immigration, which it considers uncontrolled in France. The left-wing newspaper L'Humanité, which covered the demonstration, denounced the " unabashed racism of certain demonstrators". The defence lawyer in this case deplored the political exploitation of the case, particularly by the right and the far right. While the association Collectif NousToutes counted more than 100 femicides since the beginning of 2024, the far right's statements against sexist and sexual violence remain rare.

==== Center and right: security discourse ====
Four days after Philippine's death, the new minister of the interior, Bruno Retailleau, said on the social network X that he was determined to "develop our legal arsenal to protect the French", echoing his famous diatribe "Restore order" delivered three times when he took office. Laurent Wauquiez, for his part, requested a flash mission from the Assembly. At the end of September, the deputies of Laurent Wauquiez's Republican Right group tabled a bill to extend the detention period for illegal aliens deemed dangerous.

==== Left: Femicides and denunciation of the instrumentalization ====
Several feminist associations as well as left-wing elected officials, including Sandrine Rousseau and Maëlle Noir, from the feminist collective #Noustoutes, are calling for "thinking about this crime" through the prism of femicides and repeat offences, not through that of immigration, the latter further declaring that this is the 104th femicide since the beginning of the year and that she has not heard the right, the far right or even the government on the 103 other femicides. More generally, according to the Observatory of Violence Against Women, which specifies that this is a minimum estimate, 217,000 adult women were victims of rape, attempted rape and/or sexual assault in France in 2021.

In a vitriolic column, historian Christelle Taraud denounces the anti-immigration instrumentalization of this murder and that, if Philippine must be reduced to an identity, it is certainly not to her social status, her religious confession or even her skin colour, as the extreme right expects, but rather to her quality as a woman.

The left-wing Syndicat de la Magistrature also states that these issues must "be considered through the capacity of society as a whole to prevent femicides and repeat offences, regardless of the nationality of the persons convicted". It also denounces a "xenophobic escalation".

In a column on September 28, editorialist Philippe Bernard nevertheless considers that for such tragedies not to happen again, it would be appropriate "for a part of the left to stop lazily reducing the exasperation of the French in such cases to "racism" or to the result of media-political manipulation", a discourse that is barely audible in the face of the speech of the minister of the interior, inspired by the extreme right. It is in this logic that François Hollande subscribes when he declares that "it is the problem of the OQTF, it must go quickly", also blaming on France Info the "criminal and administrative channel".

=== French media ===
Presenters from major television channels discussed the event, such as Gilles Bouleau declaring that "the profile of the murderer made politicians of all sides react", or a journalist from France 2 who commented that "the political class does not have harsh enough comments", or finally Éric Brunet, on BFM TV, who summed up: "This tragic news item has become a political fact".

According to Télérama, the continuous news channels, notably BFM TV and LCI, participated in the political and media frenzy by inviting numerous representatives of the right and the extreme right to discuss this affair.

=== International media ===
The European press reacted to the event by focusing mainly on the issue of the obligation to leave French territory imposed on the suspect. This was particularly the case for the Spanish media El País and the Swiss newspaper Le Temps. The Italian newspaper Corriere della Sera focused on the security aspect, citing the priority repeated three times by Bruno Retailleau: "restore order, restore order, restore order".

Various Arab media outlets note that this case once again crystallizes the issue of "obligations to leave French territory" (OQTF) in relations between France and the Maghreb region. This is particularly the case of the Algerian newspaper TSA which lists a large number of statements that implicate Algerians, while the suspect is Moroccan or the Moroccan newspaper TelQuel which highlights that Morocco had sent the French authorities a consular pass to allow the suspect to be removed, a few days before the murder.

== Consequences ==
=== Retailleau Plan on OQTFs ===
After having hammered home upon taking office that he was going to "restore order" and under the political and media pressure triggered by the mismanagement of the suspect, in an irregular situation and under OQTF, Bruno Retailleau summoned prefects on 8 October and unveiled his plan to increase the number of removals of illegal foreigners subject to an OQTF. Twenty-one prefects, representing 80% of the removal measures notified to foreigners, were thus summoned to the Ministry of the Interior. Among the departments concerned included Paris and its suburbs, Pas-de-Calais or the Alpes-Maritimes, but also the Bas-Rhin and the Rhône. He set as their priority the reduction of illegal, but also legal, immigration. To do this, he announced that he was going back on the famous Valls circular of 2012 which allowed the regularization of just under 30,000 people per year, but did not give any specific instructions concerning regularizations in the professions in demand provided for in the latest immigration law.

He also stated that he wanted to allow the maximum period of administrative detention to be increased to 210 days "for the most serious crimes" committed by irregular migrants, whereas it is currently only possible for this period in cases of terrorism. This option had already been mentioned by new prime minister Michel Barnier in his general policy speech a few days earlier.
