= Bruno Retailleau =

French politician (born 1960)

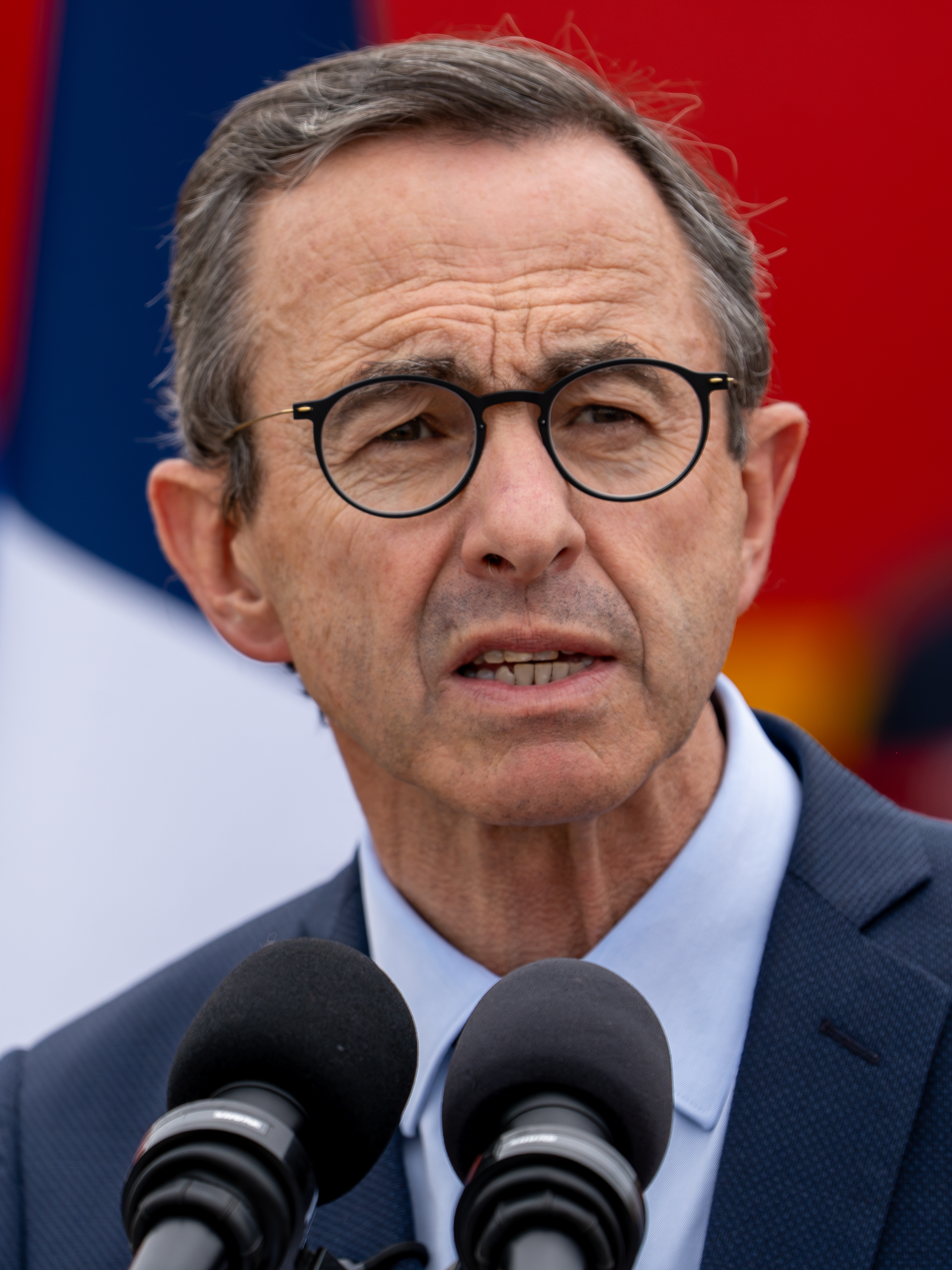
- Retailleau in 2025

Minister of State (Note: From 23 December 2024.) Minister of the Interior
- In office 21 September 2024 – 12 October 2025
- Prime Minister: Michel Barnier; François Bayrou; Sébastien Lecornu
- Preceded by: Gérald Darmanin
- Succeeded by: Laurent Nuñez

President of The Republicans
- Incumbent
- Assumed office 18 May 2025
- Preceded by: Éric Ciotti (2024)

President of The Republicans group in the Senate
- In office 7 October 2014 – 30 September 2024
- Preceded by: Jean-Claude Gaudin
- Succeeded by: Mathieu Darnaud

Senator for Vendée
- Incumbent
- Assumed office 13 November 2025
- In office 1 October 2004 – 21 October 2024

President of the Regional Council of Pays de la Loire
- In office 18 December 2015 – 13 September 2017
- Preceded by: Jacques Auxiette
- Succeeded by: Christelle Morançais

President of the General Council of Vendée
- In office 30 November 2010 – 1 April 2015
- Preceded by: Philippe de Villiers
- Succeeded by: Yves Auvinet

Member of the National Assembly for Vendée's 4th constituency
- In office 26 November 1994 – 12 June 1997
- Preceded by: Philippe de Villiers
- Succeeded by: Philippe de Villiers

Member of the General Council of Vendée for the canton of Mortagne-sur-Sèvre
- In office 3 October 1988 – 1 April 2015
- Preceded by: Gérard Brosset
- Succeeded by: Cécile Barreau; Guillaume Jean

Personal details
- Born: Bruno Daniel Marie Paul Retailleau; 20 November 1960 (age 66) Cholet, France
- Party: The Republicans (since 2015)
- Other political affiliations: Movement for France (1994–2010); Independent (2010–2012); Union for a Popular Movement (2012–2015)
- Children: 3
- Education: University of Nantes; Sciences Po

Bruno Daniel Marie Paul Retailleau (French: [bʁyno danjɛl maʁi pɔl ʁətajo]; born 20 November 1960) is a French politician who served as Minister of the Interior and Minister of State in the Bayrou government and the preceding Barnier government from 2024 to 2025. In May 2025, he was elected president of The Republicans and is the party's candidate for the 2027 French presidential election.

Retailleau has represented the Vendée department in the National Assembly from 1994 to 1997 as Philippe de Villiers's substitute and in the Senate from 2004 to 2024 and again since 2025. He presided over the Senate Republicans from 2014 to 2024. He also served as President of the General Council of Vendée from 2010 to 2015 and President of the Regional Council of Pays de la Loire from 2015 until 2017.

Following his appointment to the Barnier government, Retailleau was called its most influential figure. He swiftly announced a series of measures to "re-establish order" in France, which were met with some support and bolstered his position. After the fall of the Barnier government and during the formation of the Bayrou government, Retailleau was "at the heart of the political equation". Following the fall of the Bayrou government and on the day of the appointment of the first Lecornu government, Retailleau, who had been re-appointed Interior Minister, expressed displeasure with the government's composition, which led to Lecornu resigning and Retailleau leaving the government.

Ideologically, Retailleau is part of The Republicans' conservative wing. He has been vocal on the topic of immigration, denouncing "the French of paper" ("les Français de papier"), French citizens of foreign origin who have never socially integrated, and said that France has been "dispossessed of the control" of its borders in its contemporary history. Ahead of his appointment as Interior Minister, he called for "less immigration, more security". He has described Islamic headscarves as symbols of oppression, stressing the importance of protecting "the great conquests of the West". Famously saying, as interior minister, "long live sport, and therefore down with the veil". He has been criticised by political opponents and commentators for remarks perceived as racist and Islamophobic.

== Early life and education ==
Bruno Retailleau was born on 20 November 1960 in Cholet, Maine-et-Loire, to parents who were grain merchants. The eldest child in a family of four siblings, he grew up in Saint-Malô-du-Bois, a village in the bocage of Vendée, 7 kilometres away from where the Puy du Fou historical theme park, launched by Philippe de Villiers, would eventually emerge. Both his grandfather Lucien Retailleau and his father Michel Retailleau served as Mayors of Saint-Malô-du-Bois, respectively from 1959 to 1965, and from 1965 to 1983. His grandfather was wounded in World War I in 1914 after a bullet shot by German invading forces pierced his throat; his father fought in the Algerian War.

Retailleau graduated from Sciences Po in 1985, after obtaining a master's degree in economics at the University of Nantes.

== Professional career ==
In 1985, he became deputy general manager of a local radio station, Alouette; from 1987 to 1994, he was general manager of the Sciencescom communication school, later integrated into Audencia Business School. When the Grand Parc du Puy du Fou corporation was created, which manages the theme park associated with the "Cinéscénie", he became first chairman of the board, as a close associate of De Villiers.

== Political career ==
=== Early beginnings ===
A member of the Movement for France (MPF), founded by De Villiers, until 2010, Retailleau became the Vendée general councillor for the canton of Mortagne-sur-Sèvre in 1988, a position he retained until 2015.

=== In Parliament ===
==== National Assembly ====
Retailleau became the deputy in the National Assembly for the 4th constituency of Vendée in 1994 upon the election of De Villiers as a member of the European Parliament (MEP), a position he did not seek election to in the 1997 election, as De Villiers was running for his old seat.

==== Senate ====
Instead, Retailleau joined the Senate in 2004, where from 2014 he presided over the Union for a Popular Movement group (renamed The Republicans group in 2015), after joining the Union for a Popular Movement (UMP) of President Nicolas Sarkozy in 2012.

In 2010, he succeeded De Villiers as President of the General Council of Vendée.

=== President of the Regional Council of Pays de la Loire ===
In the 2015 regional election, Retailleau led a list in Pays de la Loire with the support of The Republicans (LR) and the Union of Democrats and Independents (UDI), which received over 42% of the second-round vote.

He supported the Aéroport du Grand Ouest project.

On 18 December 2015, he became President of the Regional Council of Pays de la Loire, an office he resigned from in 2017 to focus on his activities in the Senate.

Retailleau had held one of the regional council's vice presidencies from 1998 to 2004 under François Fillon (until 2002) and Jean-Luc Harousseau.

=== Positions within The Republicans ===
In The Republicans' 2016 primary, Retailleau endorsed former Prime Minister François Fillon as the party's candidate for President of France in the 2017 election. He subsequently joined Fillon's team as campaign coordinator.

Ahead of The Republicans' 2019 leadership election, Retailleau announced that despite speculation he would not run for the party presidency, calling Christian Jacob the "consensual" candidate.

Ahead of the 2022 presidential election, he announced he would also not run for the party nomination. At The Republicans' primary in December 2021, he was part of the 11-member committee that oversaw the party's selection of its candidate in the upcoming election.

On 2 September 2022, Retailleau announced his candidacy for the presidency of The Republicans. In an internal leadership vote, he was eventually defeated by Éric Ciotti on 11 December 2022. Despite working closely with Ciotti following the latter's election as party president, Retailleau sided against him amid the 2024 The Republicans alliance crisis.

In 2025, he decided to run again for the party presidency, this time as favourite in the polls, against former party president Laurent Wauquiez. He secured 74% of the vote to defeat Wauquiez in the 18 May election.

=== Minister of the Interior, 2024–2025 ===
On 21 September 2024, Retailleau was appointed Minister of the Interior in the government of Prime Minister Michel Barnier, succeeding Gérald Darmanin. His appointment marked a shift to the right; shortly prior to his appointment, he had called for "less immigration, more security".

Retailleau's first days as Interior Minister were marked by the murder of Philippine Le Noir de Carlan in Paris by a Moroccan illegal immigrant, who had previously been convicted of rape and imprisoned, but had not been deported following his release. After taking office, Retailleau proposed a number of measures to "take back control" of France's immigration policy, which were met by favourable polls. Ahead of introducing a bill on the subject, he demanded prefects order a "complete mobilisation" to "speed up the pace of deportations" of illegal migrants.

His tenure and approval rating made him "unavoidable" after the fall of the Barnier government, with speculations that he would be included in the next government. He was thus retained by François Bayrou when he succeeded Barnier, with Retailleau titled Minister of State on 23 December 2024.

In January 2025, Retailleau stated Algeria was trying to "humiliate" France as it refused to allow illegal migrants to return after France tried to deport them. One of these migrants perpetrated a stabbing attack in February 2025 in Mulhouse, which left one person dead. Bayrou stated that France had tried 14 times to deport him, to no avail. Bilateral relations worsened as a consequence, the imprisonment of French-Algerian writer Boualem Sansal in Algeria also contributing to the impasse. A former chief of staff to the Algerian president and the wife of the Algerian ambassador to Mali were refused access to French territory in February and March 2025, respectively. In March 2025, President Emmanuel Macron supported Retailleau's approach, and backed his call for tougher measures in August 2025, with Macron withholding approval for five Algerian consuls to enter France, stating: "The response of the Algerian authorities to our demands regarding migration and consular cooperation will determine the next steps in our process." In July 2025, Retailleau had ordered Algerian diplomats be barred from accessing the diplomatic bags retrieval area at Paris Charles de Gaulle Airport and Paris Orly Airport, thus hindering the deliverance of identification documents to Algerians residing in France.

After the Bayrou government was toppled in its turn by a motion of no confidence in the National Assembly on 8 September 2025, Retailleau was appointed again as Minister of the Interior and Minister of State in the first government of Sébastien Lecornu. However, the same day, he expressed displeasure with the government's composition, which led to Lecornu resigning the following day and Retailleau leaving the government.

=== 2027 presidential campaign ===
Retailleau announced in February 2026 that he would seek The Republicans' nomination for the 2027 presidential election. He was subsequently nominated by the party on 19 April 2026.

== Political positions ==
Retailleau states he belongs to a right-wing movement that does not compromise on its values. A supporter of opposition to President Emmanuel Macron's centrist politics, he refused any government agreement with Macron's party, Renaissance, in 2022. In 2024, he joined the Barnier government, a centre-right coalition government which includes Renaissance.

Regularly described as a liberal-conservative, Retailleau advocates major reforms of work, of the state and of the French social model, and calls for "a policy of civilisation" against wokeism. A proponent of a firmer response to security issues, Retailleau defends a "penal revolution" including measures such as the introduction of short prison sentences from the first acts of delinquency, lowering the age of criminal responsibility to 16 years, and suspending social and family benefits to parents who do not endorse their educational responsibilities. Attached to national sovereignty, he regularly denounces the influence of jurisprudence such as that of the ECHR, was opposed to the Treaty of Lisbon and refuses any federalist push within the European Union.

In 2019, advocating for "an intellectual refoundation" of the right, Retailleau aimed to give back an ideological corpus to his political family, calling on the right to seize new issues, such as environmentalism, to which he devoted a book.

In March 2024, Retailleau voted against an amendment that enshrined abortion in the Constitution.

=== Immigration ===
Retailleau is a staunch opponent of immigration. He has called for constitutional changes so a referendum can be held on the matter. During one of the debates on an immigration bill in July 2024, which was introduced by his predecessor Gérald Darmanin, he stated "immigration is not an opportunity for France." In 2023, following the Nahel Merzouk riots, Retailleau denounced a "regression towards the ethnic origins" of many rioters, adding that although they were French by citizenship, they were in his opinion not culturally so. He called citizens of foreign origin who lack integration "French of paper" ("Français de papier"). His statements received a substantial amount of criticism. He later stated that France had been "dispossessed of the control" of its borders, notably through European jurisprudence.

Upon becoming Minister of the Interior in 2024, he ordered the deportation of undocumented immigrants from the overseas island of Mayotte to the DRC. In an interview with French daily newspaper Le Parisien on 10 October, Retailleau stated his intention of tightening the amount of undocumented immigrants who can see their legal situation change, and be integrated into French society.

In October 2024, Retailleau asked to renegotiate a 1968 agreement with Algeria, which governs immigration between Algeria and France. In November 2024, he said he was in favour of its repeal, a result of the deterioration of relations between Algeria and France.

=== Foreign policy ===
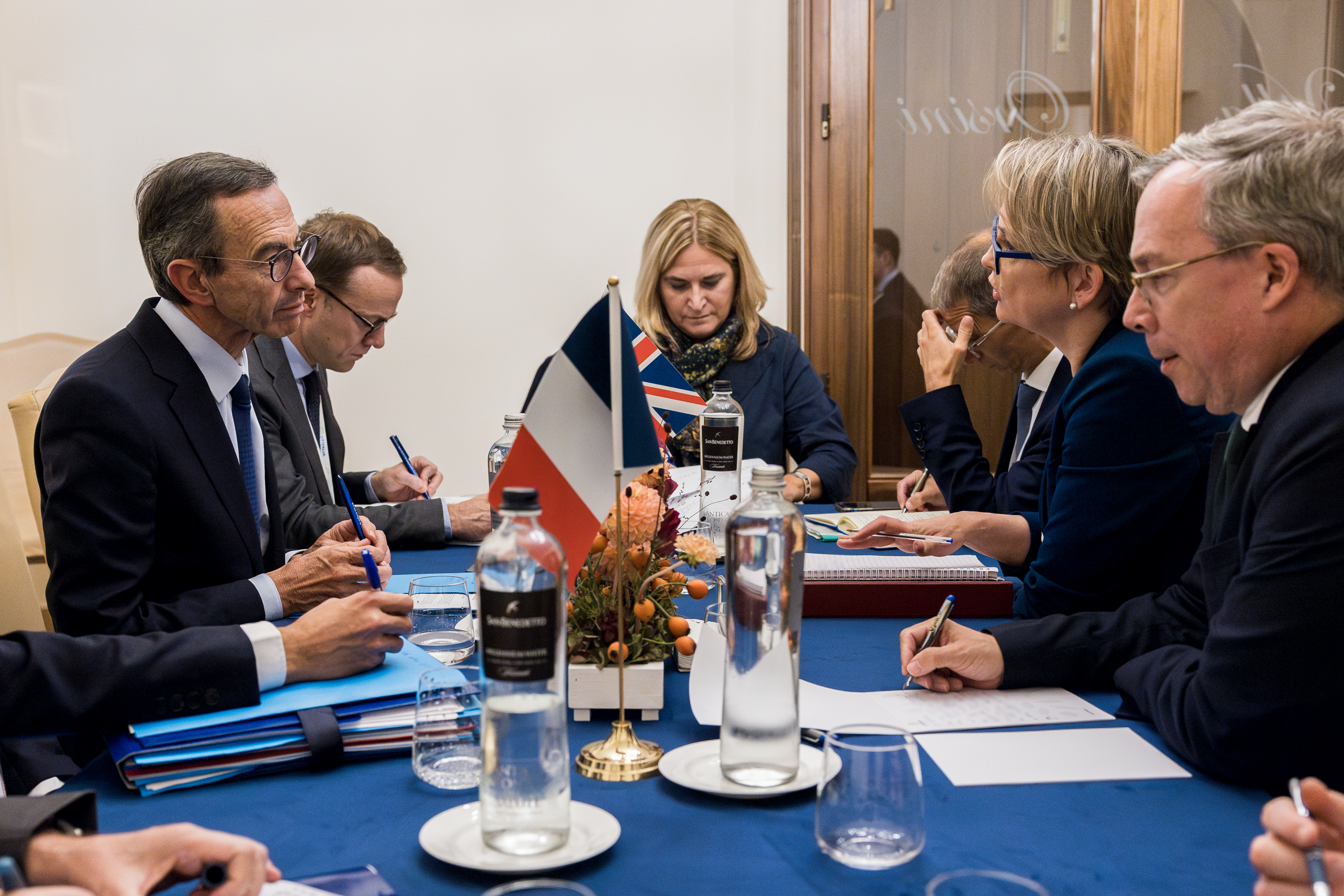
Retailleau with UK Home Secretary Yvette Cooper, 2024

In a joint letter initiated by Norbert Röttgen and Anthony Gonzalez ahead of the 47th G7 summit in 2021, Retailleau joined some 70 legislators from Europe, the US and Japan, in calling upon their leaders to take a tough stance on China and to "avoid becoming dependent" on the country for technology, including artificial intelligence and 5G.

Following the 2023 Nigerien coup d'état, Retailleau joined forces with fellow Senators Christian Cambon and Roger Karoutchi in an open letter to President Macron, published in Le Figaro, criticising France's Africa policy and arguing that the failure of Operation Barkhane was mostly the reason why France and its economic, political and military presence had been rejected in Mali, Burkina Faso, Niger and the Central African Republic; the letter was signed by 91 other senators.

==== Israel ====
In 2019, Retailleau wrote to the Israeli ambassador to France, demanding that Christians who live in Gaza be allowed to travel to Bethlehem and Jerusalem for Christmas.

Following the October 7 attacks and the ensuing Gaza war, Retailleau expressed strong support for Israel, which has positioned him as an ally to Prime Minister Benjamin Netanyahu, echoing sentiments from France's right-leaning political factions.

== Personal life ==
Married to a medical doctor, Retailleau is the father of three children and is a practising Roman Catholic.

Passionate about horseback riding, Retailleau was spotted by Philippe de Villiers while participating as a volunteer rider in the "Cinéscénie" show at the Puy du Fou. The creator of the show, who'd quickly made him his second-in-command, later entrusted him with the staging of the Cinescénie for nearly 25 years.

== Bibliography ==
=== Books ===
- Retailleau, Bruno (23 August 2010). Les entreprises de taille intermédiaire au coeur d'une nouvelle dynamique de croissance (in French). Paris: La Documentation Française. p. 170. ISBN 978-2110081629.
- Retailleau, Bruno (20 March 2019). Refondation (in French). Paris: Éditions de l'Observatoire. p. 288. ISBN 979-1032906286.
- Retailleau, Bruno (21 October 2021). Aurons-nous encore de la lumière en hiver ? (in French). Paris: Éditions de l'Observatoire. p. 140. ISBN 979-1032924266.

=== Biography ===
- Schuck, Nathalie (11 September 2025). Le Cardinal Les combats et ambitions de Bruno Retailleau, le nouvel homme fort de la droite (in French). Paris: Robert Laffont. p. 218. ISBN 978-2221281628.
