= 2022 The Republicans (France) leadership election =

2022 The Republicans leadership election
← 2019	3–4 December (first round); 10–11 December 2022 (second round)	2025 →
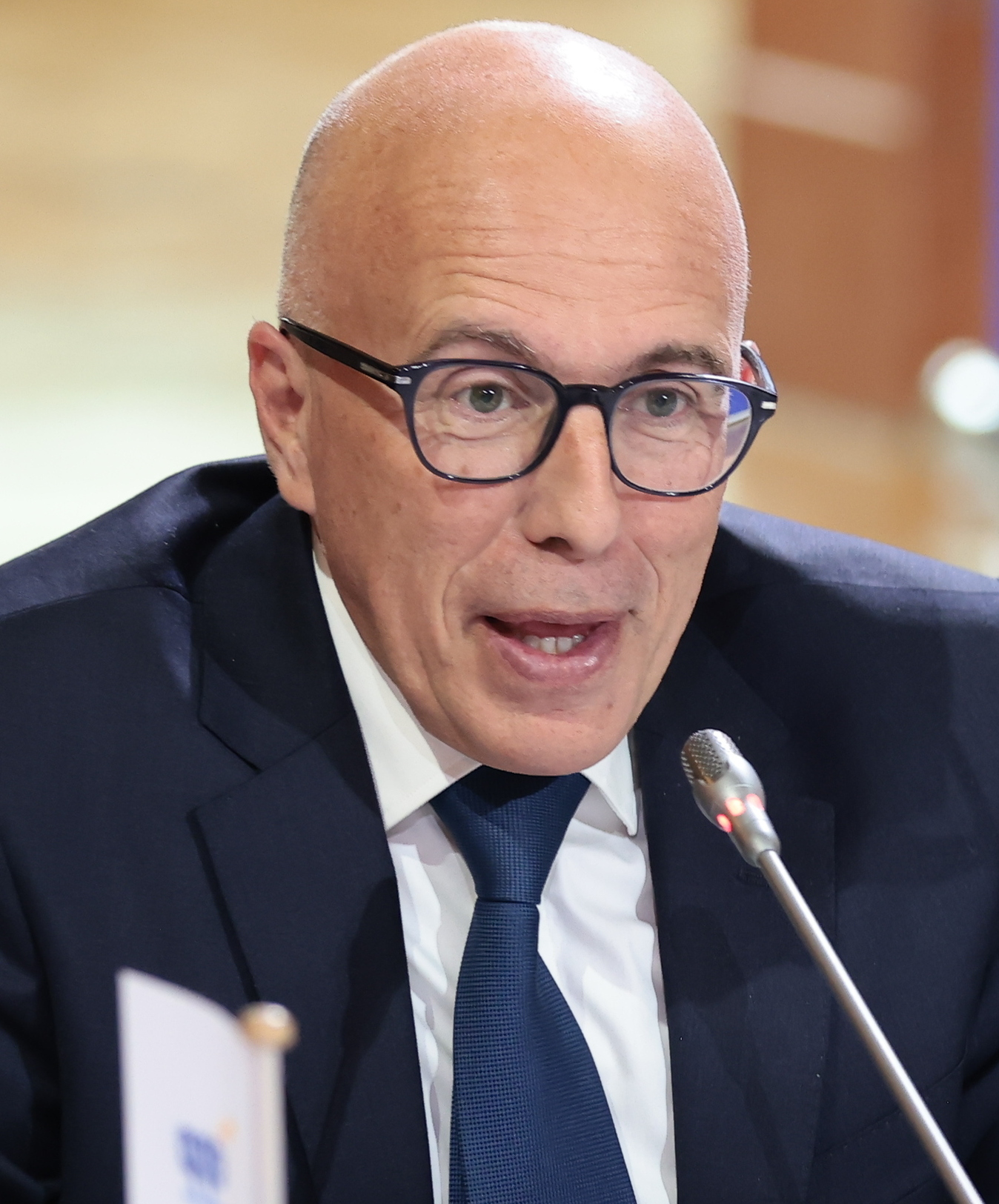

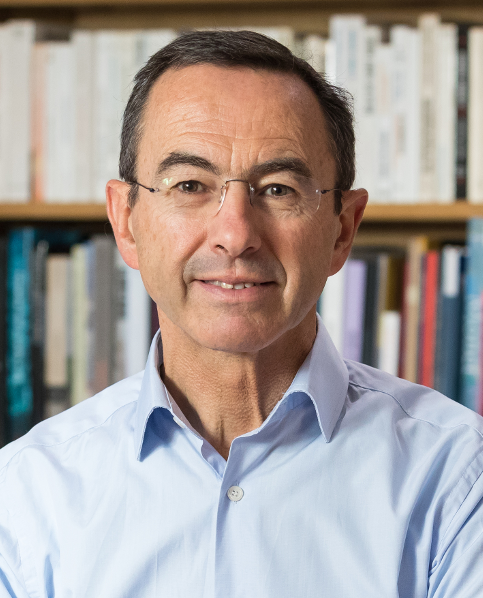
Nominee	Éric Ciotti	Bruno Retailleau
Party	LR	LR
Popular vote	33,609	28,977
Percentage	53.70%	46.30%
President before election
Christian Jacob
Elected President
Éric Ciotti

The 2022 The Republicans leadership election was held on 3–4 December (first round) and 10–11 December 2022 (second round) following the resignation of Christian Jacob.

Éric Ciotti was elected to lead the party, winning in the second round against Bruno Retailleau.

== Results ==
Candidate	Party	First round		Second round	
Candidate	Party	Votes	%	Votes	%
Éric Ciotti	LR	28,297	42.73	33,609	53.70
Bruno Retailleau	LR	22,815	34.45	28,977	46.30
Aurélien Pradié	LR	14,765	22.29		
Votes cast		65,877	99.48	62,586	
Blank and invalid votes		339	0.51		
Total		66,216	100		100
Abstention		24,894	27.32		30.25
Registered / participation		91,110	72.68	91,105	69.75
