= L'Opinion (French newspaper) =

Daily newspaper published in France

- Type: Daily newspaper
- Format: Berliner format
- Owner(s): Nicolas Beytout (24,4 %); Bernard Arnault (22,8 %); Family Bettencourt (17,1 %); Dow Jones and Company (7,6 %)
- Founder(s): Nicolas Beytout
- Publisher: Bey Medias Presse and Internet
- Founded: 15 May 2013; 12 years ago
- Political alignment: Economic liberalism
- Language: French
- Headquarters: Paris
- Website: L'Opinion

L'Opinion (French pronunciation: [lɔpinjɔ̃]) is a daily newspaper based in Paris, France, which has been in circulation since 2013. The paper has an economic liberal editorial stance.

== History and profile ==
L'Opinion was first published on 15 May 2013. The website, launched on 14 May 2013, hosts all the print issues available in digital format. The founder of the paper is Nicolas Beytout who served as the editor of Le Figaro and Les Échos. L'Opinion was modelled on the Italian daily Il Foglio and American political publication Politico.

L'Opinion is published by Bey Medias Presse and Internet. L'Opinion is headquartered in Paris and is published in Berliner format. The paper defines itself as a liberal, pro-business, and pro-European publication. Luc de Barochez is the editor-in-chief of the online version of the paper which is behind a paywall.

== See also ==
- List of newspapers in France
