= Céline Imart =

French cereal farmer, trade unionist, and politician (born 1982)

Céline Imart MEP
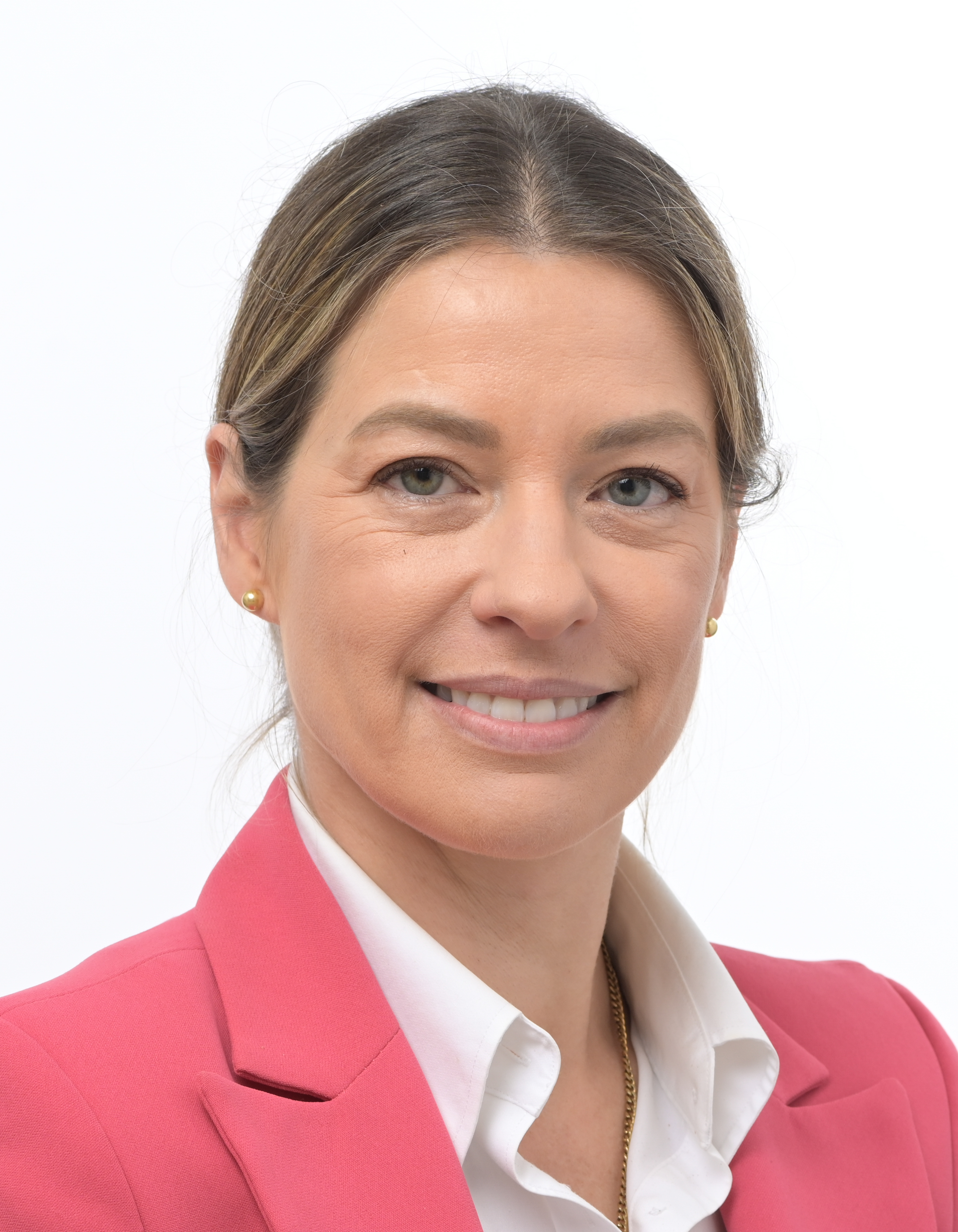
- Official portrait, 2024

Member of the European Parliament
- Incumbent
- Assumed office 16 July 2024
- Constituency: France

Personal details
- Born: 24 August 1982 (age 44) Toulouse, France
- Party: The Republicans
- Other political affiliations: FNSEA
- Education: Sciences Po; ESSEC Business School

Céline Imart (born 24 August 1982) is a French cereal farmer, trade unionist, and politician of The Republicans (LR) who has been serving as a member of the European Parliament since 2024.

== Early career ==
For two years, Imart worked as CFO of a Bolloré subsidiary in Santiago, Chile. On her return to France, she joined the Paris office of consulting firm PwC.

In 2011, Imart took over her family's farm in Aguts.

== Political career ==
Imart was a member of the agriculture group of the Economic, Social and Environmental Council from 2010 to 2015, and served as vice president of Jeunes Agriculteurs from 2014 to 2018.

In March 2024, Imart was appointed campaign director of LR for the European elections, alongside François-Xavier Bellamy and Othman Nasrou.

In the European Parliament, Imart has been serving on the Committee on International Trade and the Committee on Agriculture and Rural Development. In addition to her committee assignments, she is part of the parliament's delegation to the Euro-Latin American Parliamentary Assembly.
