= 2019 The Republicans (France) leadership election =

2019 The Republicans leadership election
- 13 October 2019
- Turnout: 47.44% ▲4.98%
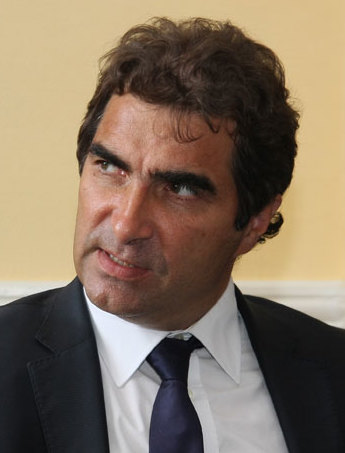

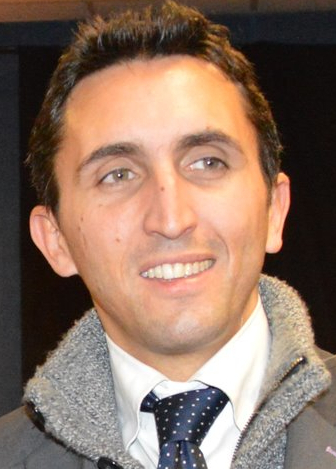

Nominee	Christian Jacob	Julien Aubert	Guillaume Larrivé
Party	LR	LR	LR
Popular vote	38,712	13,162	9,982
Percentage	62.58%	21.28%	16.14%
President before election
Jean Leonetti (interim)
Elected President
Christian Jacob

A leadership election was held in 2019 for the Republicans. It was triggered by the resignation of Laurent Wauquiez and was won by Christian Jacob.

== Candidates ==
- Julien Aubert, member of the National Assembly for Vaucluse's 5th constituency
- Christian Jacob, group president of The Republicans in the National Assembly and the member for Seine-et-Marne's 4th constituency
- Guillaume Larrivé, member of the National Assembly for Yonne's 1st constituency

== Results ==
Candidate	First round	
Candidate	Voice	%
Christian Jacob	38,712	62.58
Julien Aubert	13 162	21.28
Guillaume Larrivee	9,982	16.14
Votes cast	61 856	99.13
Voters	62,401	47.44
Abstentions	69,113	52.56
Registered	131,514	100.00
