= The Republicans (France) =

French political party

The Republicans Les Républicains
- Abbreviation: LR
- President: Bruno Retailleau
- Secretary-General: Othman Nasrou
- Founder: Nicolas Sarkozy
- Founded: 30 May 2015; 11 years ago
- Preceded by: Union for a Popular Movement
- Headquarters: 4 Place du Palais-Bourbon, 75007 Paris
- Youth wing: Les Jeunes Républicains
- Membership (2023): ▼72,251
- Ideology: Conservatism (French); Liberal conservatism Neo-Gaullism
- Political position: Centre-right to right-wing
- National affiliation: Union of the Right and Centre
- European affiliation: European People's Party
- European Parliament group: European People's Party Group
- International affiliation: Centrist Democrat International
- Colours: Blue; White; Red
- National Assembly: 52 / 577
- Senate: 121 / 348
- European Parliament: 5 / 81
- Presidencies of regional councils: 3 / 17
- Presidencies of departmental councils: 36 / 94

Website
- republicains.fr

The Republicans (French: Les Républicains [le ʁepyblikɛ̃], LR) is a conservative political party in France, partially inspired by the tradition of Gaullism. The party was formed in 2015 as the reformation of the Union for a Popular Movement (UMP) and Union of the Right and Centre, which had been established in 2002 under the leadership of the then-president of France, Jacques Chirac LR is a member of the Centrist Democrat International and the European People's Party, and sits in the European People's Party Group in the European Parliament.

The UMP used to be one of the two major political parties in the Fifth Republic, along with the centre-left Socialist Party, before being eclipsed by the National Rally and Renaissance. The LR candidate in the 2017 presidential election, former Prime Minister François Fillon, placed third in the first round, with 20.0% of the vote. Following the 2017 legislative election, LR became the second-largest party in the National Assembly, behind President Emmanuel Macron's La République En Marche! party (later renamed Renaissance). After a disappointing result in the 2019 European Parliament election, party leader Laurent Wauquiez resigned. He was replaced by Christian Jacob, who remained in office until after the 2022 legislative election, which saw LR lose half of its seats, although it became the kingmaker in a hung parliament. One month before, in the 2022 presidential election, LR nominee Valérie Pécresse placed fifth with 4.7% of the vote. Despite those setbacks, LR was still the largest party in the Senate and headed a plurality of regions of France. Éric Ciotti became president of LR after the 2022 leadership election. In the run-up of the 2024 French legislative election Ciotti came out in favour of an electoral alliance with National Rally. This would have reversed the historic cordon sanitaire that the party had regarding the group. Ciotti was soon removed from his position, which led to a leadership crisis. In May 2025, Bruno Retailleau was elected president of the party.

== History ==
=== Origins in the UMP ===
The UMP's (Union for a Popular Movement) change of party name and of party structure was one of the promises made by Nicolas Sarkozy during his campaign for the UMP presidency in 2014. After his election in November 2014, Nicolas Sarkozy, the President of France from 2007 to 2012, put forward the request to the party's general committee to change its name to Les Républicains ("The Republicans") and alter the statutes of the party. The proposed statutes provided for, among other provisions, the election of the presidents of the departmental federations by direct democracy and consulting members on election nominations.

Sarkozy wanted to change the name of the party to showcase the reunification of the disparate political views, from the social Gaullism of Henri Guaino to the right line of Patrick Buisson, into "one family". As declared in an interview for the Journal du Dimanche, Sarkozy also wished to change the name in order to be ahead of his adversaries Alain Juppé and François Fillon (also belonging to the UMP) for the 2017 presidential election.

The proposal to change the name was not received well by all members of the party. In an interview for BFMTV, Alain Juppé mocked the ex-French President for wanting to change the name of the UMP. Additionally, Gilles Boyer, supporter of François Fillon, showed his reluctance regarding the change of name by tweeting, "We are republicans. We are not THE republicans." The change of name was perceived by some journalists as an attempt to make the public forget the judicial problems linked to the UMP, especially the Bygmalion case, in which some members of the UMP are suspected to have forged documents relating to the expenses of Nicolas Sarkozy's 2012 presidential campaign.

Critics of the name change claimed it was unfair for Sarkozy to name the party "Republicans", because every French person is a republican if they support the values and ideals of the French Republic that emanated from the French Revolution; as such, the term is above party politics. Left-wing associations and parties and 140 individuals, including five having "Républicain" as their last name, sued the UMP. The court ruled in favour of the UMP's change in name, stating that the "manifestly unlawful disturbance" and the "imminent damage" alleged by the complainants have not been demonstrated. The new name was adopted by the party bureau on 5 May 2015 and approved by the party membership on 28 May by an online "yes" vote of 83.3% on a 45.7% turnout after a court ruling in favour of Sarkozy.

=== Founding congress ===
The change to the name "The Republicans" was confirmed at the party's founding congress at the Paris Event Centre in Paris on 30 May 2015, attended by 10,000 activists. Angela Merkel, chairwoman of the Christian Democratic Union of Germany, sent a congratulatory message to the congress. The Republicans thus became the legal successor of the UMP and the leading centre-right party in France.

The organisation has been declared in the préfecture de Saône-et-Loire on 9 April 2015. According to the statement of this declaration, its aim is to "promote ideas of the right and centre, open to every people who wish to be member and debate in the spirit of a political party with republican ideas in France or outside France". This party foundation was published in the Journal officiel de la République française on 25 April 2015.

=== 2016 to 2018 ===
On 3 July 2016, Nicolas Sarkozy announced that he would resign as leader that year in order to compete to be the centre-right candidate in the 2017 presidential election. In order to decide which candidate will represent The Republicans for the 2017 presidential election, a party's primary was organised in November 2016. The activists of the movement could choose between seven candidates: François Fillion, Alain Juppé, Nicolas Sarkozy, Jean-François Copé, Nathalie Kosciusko-Morizet, Bruno Le Maire and Jean-Frédéric Poisson. François Fillon, with 44.1% of the votes, and Alain Juppé, with 28.6%, were the two candidates qualified for the second round of the election. François Fillon won the second turn of the election with 66.5% of the votes and was therefore appointed as The Republicans' candidate for the presidential election in 2017.

François Fillon suffered a historic defeat in the first round of the presidential election, as he was the first centre-right candidate in the history of the Fifth Republic who failed to continue to the second round. This led to the victory of Emmanuel Macron, leader of his newly created party La République En Marche!. François Fillon finished third in the first round of the presidential election with 20.01% of the vote, behind Emmanuel Macron (24.01%) and Marine le Pen (21.30%). This defeat is mainly due to the Penelopegate scandal, as François Fillon was considered the favourite candidate by the polls before these revelations.

The election victory of Emmanuel Macron in 2017 altered the French political landscape. After Emmanuel Macron was elected as president, he appointed three centre-right politicians in his government from The Republicans, namely Édouard Philippe as Prime Minister, Bruno Le Maire as French Minister of the Economy and Finance, and Gérald Darmanin as Minister of Public Action and Accounts. The fact that three ex-members from The Republicans are now part of the government, has allegedly divided the political party based on views of whether or not the republicans should support the incumbent government. Some members of The Republicans, such as Thierry Solère or Sébastien Lecornu, therefore decided to leave the party in order to join La République En Marche!, the new political party created by Emmanuel Macron. Other members, like Franck Riester or Fabienne Keller, decided to create a new political party: "Agir". Additionally, a parliamentary group including LR dissidents supportive of the government line, "The Constructives", was formed in the National Assembly, separate from the existing group.

A month after the presidential election, the legislative elections took place in France. In the second round of the legislative elections in June, The Republicans won 112 seats in parliament, which is 82 less than the number of seats won by the UMP in 2012. This result was the worst performance of a major centre-right political party in French history. On 11 July, the political bureau of The Republicans agreed to hold a leadership election for president of the party on 10 and 17 December; Laurent Wauquiez was elected in a single round on 10 December, winning 74.64% of the votes. Laurent Wauquiez's election for the head of the Party continued to divide The Republicans as 26 elected officials left the party between his election on 10 December and 21 February 2018.

=== Since 2019 ===
On 2 June 2019, a week after overseeing the worst result for the centre-right in its history in the European elections with 8.48% of the vote, Wauquiez announced his resignation as president of The Republicans. On 13 October 2019, Christian Jacob, former Minister of the French Civil Service, was elected as President of the party, taking from interim President Jean Leonetti. In the 2020 French Senate election, the Republicans held their majority. In the 2021 French regional elections, the party managed to retain all regional presidencies.

In December 2021, Valérie Pécresse won the Republican congress, winning the centre-right to be the Republican candidate in the 2022 French presidential election. She earned 4.8% of the 1st round vote, which was under the 5% reimbursement threshold. Consequently, the party's funding was left in a critical condition and Pécresse launched an appeal, having been in €5 million in party debt. In the 2022 French legislative election, the Republicans lost 56 seats and fell from 2nd to 4th place in terms of seats. In the 2022 leadership election, Éric Ciotti was elected with 53.7% of the votes against his main opponent, Bruno Retailleau, who received 46.3% to become the next leader of the party. Ciotti has largely been described as right-wing and of belonging in the populist faction of the party.

==== 2024 leadership crisis ====
In the aftermath of the 2024 European Parliament election and the subsequent dissolution of the National Assembly by President Emmanuel Macron, Éric Ciotti declared his party would unite with National Rally for the upcoming 2024 snap election. This stance provoked a major schism within the party, with French senators Sophie Primas and Jean-François Husson announcing on 11 June that they would leave the party. Ciotti was voted out as president on 12 June, though he disputed the decision. He was also expelled from the party on 14 June. A Paris court reviewed the case on 14 June and ruled in Ciotti's favor, reinstating him as party leader and a member of the party. Ciotti's decision to ally with the RN was endorsed by the leader of the Les Jeunes Républicains Guilhem Carayon and by MEP Céline Imart, a member of the Fédération nationale des syndicats d'exploitants agricoles (FNSEA).

Ciotti resigned from the party on 22 September, instead leading the Union of the Right for the Republic. Although LR had previously promised not to participate in a government coalition after the 2024 legislative election, they ultimately joined the Barnier government, led by an LR member. After Michel Barnier's ousting, LR joined the Bayrou government. In both governments, Ministry of Interior was occupied by former Senate Republicans president Bruno Retailleau.

== Ideology ==
On the political spectrum, LR are positioned on the centre-right to right-wing. They are a conservative party. In addition, the party also maintains a Gaullist, or neo-Gaullist, tradition.

=== Shift to the right ===
From the creation of the UMP in 2002, and particularly under the presidency of Nicolas Sarkozy, the party adopted a strategy of siphoning off voters from the far-right National Rally by taking up its themes. This period saw the emergence of La Droite populaire, a parliamentary subgroup of around thirty deputies promoting the preferred themes of the far-right.

After 2017, weakened by competition from Macronism and the gradual loss of its centrist voters, LR found itself with officials "increasingly numerous in thinking like the RN", according to the political scientist Florence Haegel. For the political scientist Olivier Rouquan, this radicalisation resulted in particular from the abandonment of the Chiracian legacy and the departure of moderate figures, which left the centre-right space to Emmanuel Macron. Despite this evolution, Rouquan considers that LR retains differences from the far-right, particularly on the European Union and in its institutional anchoring. Questions of economics and political socialisation also separate LR from the RN.

This ideological radicalisation has been accompanied by the development of a media space in which representatives of the governing right and the far-right coexist (Valeurs actuelles, CNews, FigaroVox, Causeur), contributing to the normalisation of a shared political space. The party regularly invites figures from the radical right as speakers at its rallies, including Éric Zemmour, Mathieu Bock-Côté and Eugénie Bastié. This evolution is reflected in the adoption of certain turns of phrase, such as the expression "Français de papier" [fr] (lit. ''French on paper only'') used by Valérie Pécresse during the 2022 presidential campaign, an expression that was notably welcomed by Jean-Marie Le Pen.

For Haegel, The Republicans moved considerably closer to the National Rally in 2024, particularly under the impetus of Éric Ciotti, who justified his electoral alliance during the 2024 legislative elections by observing that the two parties "say the same thing". Similarly, she considered that the Barnier government, which was supported by LR, largely took up the RN's agenda on issues of security, immigration and identity, thereby marking a reversal in the balance of power in which LR appears to have abandoned the project of embodying an alternative to the far-right.

According to the political scientist Émilien Houard-Vial, this strategy contributes to legitimizing far-right ideas and to weakening the right's propensity to reject proposals associated with racism. For Rouquan and Houard-Vial, it creates the conditions for the party's electoral collapse.

== Overseas territories ==
In Guadeloupe, the Head of List of The Republicans is Sonia Petro. She has also served as the President of the Federation of Republicans of Guadeloupe.

== Leadership ==
=== President ===
| No. | Name | Portrait | Began | Left |
|---|---|---|---|---|
| 1 | Nicolas Sarkozy | | 30 May 2015 | 23 August 2016 |
| — | Laurent Wauquiez | | 23 August 2016 | 29 November 2016 |
Vacant from 29 November 2016 to 10 December 2017
| 2 | Laurent Wauquiez | | 10 December 2017 | 2 June 2019 |
| — | Jean Leonetti | | 2 June 2019 | 13 October 2019 |
| 3 | Christian Jacob | Laurent Wauquiez | 13 October 2019 | 30 June 2022 |
| — | Annie Genevard | | 30 June 2022 | 11 December 2022 |
| 4 | Éric Ciotti | | 11 December 2022 | 22 September 2024 |
| Interim collegial leadership (François-Xavier Bellamy, Annie Genevard, Michèle Tabarot, Daniel Fasquelle) | | | 22 September 2024 | 18 May 2025 |
| 5 | Bruno Retailleau | | 18 May 2025 | |

=== Vice president ===
| No. | Name | Portrait | Began | Left |
|---|---|---|---|---|
| 1 | Nathalie Kosciusko-Morizet | | 30 May 2015 | 15 December 2015 |
| 2 | Laurent Wauquiez | | 15 December 2015 | 23 August 2016 |
| 2 | Laurent Wauquiez | | 29 November 2016 | 10 December 2017 |
| 2 | Isabelle Le Callennec | | 15 December 2015 | 13 December 2017 |
| 3 | Virginie Calmels | | 13 December 2017 | 17 June 2018 |
| 3 | Guillaume Peltier | | 13 December 2017 | 7 December 2021 |
| 3 | Damien Abad | | 13 December 2017 | 23 October 2019 |
| 4 | Jean Leonetti | | 17 June 2018 | 23 October 2019 |
| 5 | Annie Genevard | | 6 July 2021 | 18 January 2023 |
| 6 | Aurélien Pradié | | 18 January 2023 | 18 February 2023 |
| 7 | François-Xavier Bellamy | | 18 February 2023 | Incumbent |

=== Secretary-general ===
| No. | Name | Portrait | Began | Left |
|---|---|---|---|---|
| 1 | Laurent Wauquiez | | 30 May 2015 | 15 December 2015 |
| 2 | Éric Woerth | | 15 December 2015 | 29 November 2016 |
| 3 | Bernard Accoyer | | 29 November 2016 | 13 December 2017 |
| 4 | Annie Genevard | | 13 December 2017 | 23 October 2019 |
| 5 | Aurélien Pradié | | 23 October 2019 | 18 January 2023 |
| (4) | Annie Genevard | | 18 January 2023 | 22 May 2025 |
| 6 | Othman Nasrou | | 22 May 2025 | Incumbent |

=== Treasurer ===
| No. | Name | Portrait | Began | Left |
|---|---|---|---|---|
| 1 | Daniel Fasquelle | | 30 May 2015 | 22 May 2025 |
| 2 | Pierre Danon | | 22 May 2025 | Incumbent |

== Election results ==
=== Presidential ===
Presidency of the French Republic
| Election year | Candidate | 1st round | | | 2nd round | | | Result |
| Election year | Candidate | Votes | % | Rank | Votes | % | Rank | Result |
|---|---|---|---|---|---|---|---|---|
| 2017 | François Fillon | 7,212,995 | 20.01 | ▲3rd | —N/a | | | Lost |
| 2022 | Valérie Pécresse | 1,679,001 | 4.79 | ▼5th | —N/a | | | Lost |

=== National Assembly ===
National Assembly
| Election year | Leader | 1st round | | 2nd round | | Seats | +/− | Rank (seats) | Government |
| Election year | Leader | Votes | % | Votes | % | Seats | +/− | Rank (seats) | Government |
|---|---|---|---|---|---|---|---|---|---|
| 2017 | François Baroin | 3,573,427 | 15.77 | 4,040,203 | 22.23 | 112 / 577 | ▼82 | ▼2nd | Opposition |
| 2022 | Christian Jacob | 2,370,811 | 10.42 | 1,447,838 | 6.98 | 61 / 577 | ▼51 | ▼4th | Opposition |
| 2024 | Disputed leadership (Note: Éric Ciotti was de jure party leader (after being restored in the interim by a Paris court) but presented a rival set of around 60 candidates in an alliance with the National Rally (RN) against roughly 400 candidates selected by the national investiture committee of The Republicans (French: commission nationale d'investiture des Républicains) under Annie Genevard, François-Xavier Bellamy, and Daniel Fasquelle, who were installed as interim party presidents before Ciotti's reinstatement as president and party member.) | 2,104,918 | 6.57 | 1,474,721 | 5.41 | 39 / 577 (Note: On 31 August, 17 of the party's members defected to form UDR.) | ▼22 | 4th | Presidential minority (2024) |
| 2024 | Disputed leadership | 2,104,918 | 6.57 | 1,474,721 | 5.41 | 39 / 577 | ▼22 | 4th | Presidential minority (2024−2025) |
| 2024 | Disputed leadership | 2,104,918 | 6.57 | 1,474,721 | 5.41 | 39 / 577 | ▼22 | 4th | Presidential minority (2025) |
| 2024 | Disputed leadership | 2,104,918 | 6.57 | 1,474,721 | 5.41 | 39 / 577 | ▼22 | 4th | Support (2025−present) |

=== European Parliament ===
| Election | Leader | Votes | % | Seats | +/− | EP Group |
|---|---|---|---|---|---|---|
| 2019 (Note: Run in a joint list with LC and CPNT, that won 8 seats in total.) | François-Xavier Bellamy | 1,920,407 | 8.48 (#4) | 7 / 79 | New | EPP |
| 2024 (Note: Run in a joint list with LC, that won 6 seats in total.) | François-Xavier Bellamy | 1,783,965 | 7.24 (#5) | 6 / 81 | ▼1 | EPP |

== See also ==
- Politics of France
- List of political parties in France
- The Republicans group (National Assembly)
- The Republicans group (Senate)
