= Éric Ciotti =

French politician (born 1965)

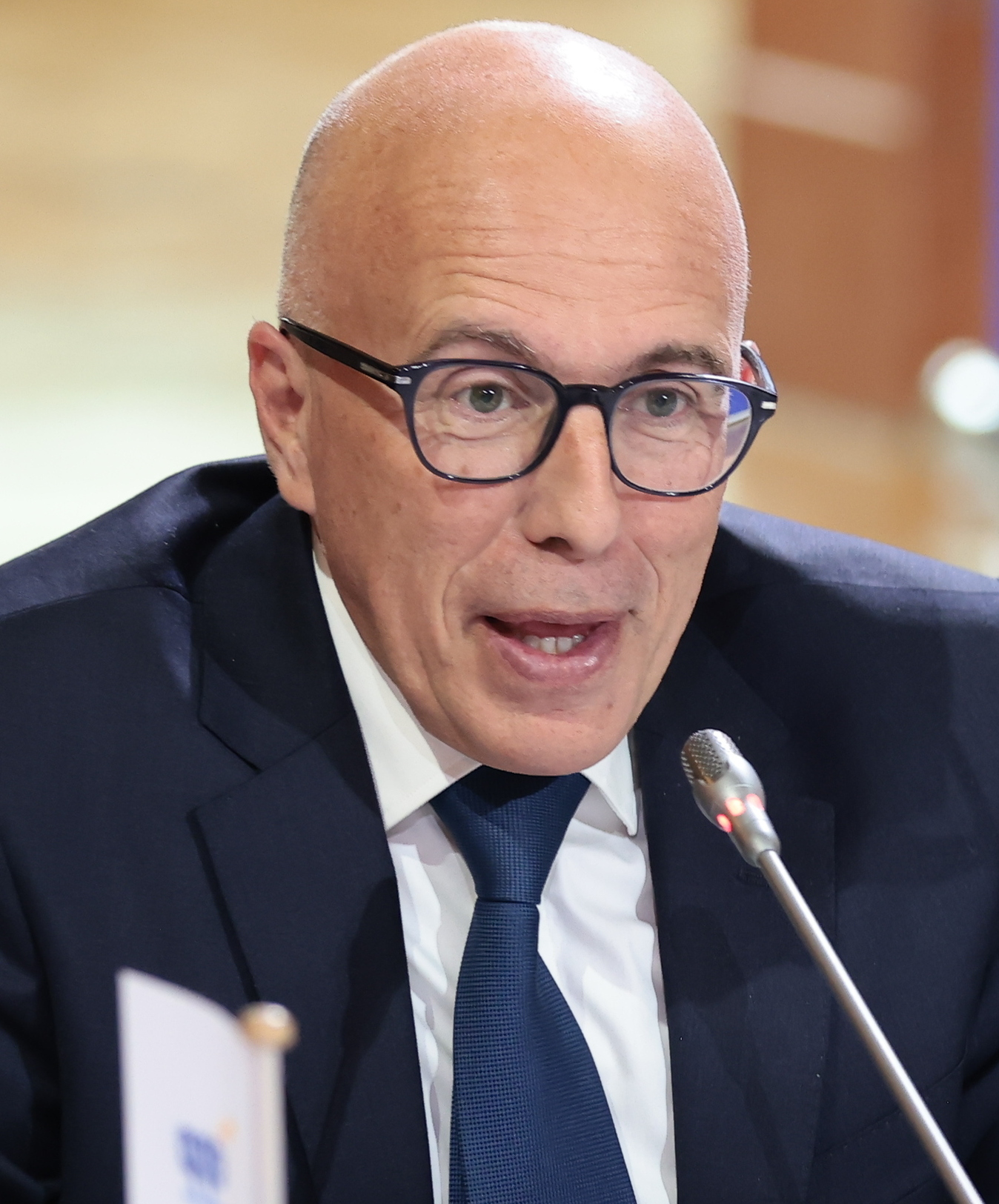
- Ciotti in 2023

President of Métropole Nice Côte d'Azur
- Incumbent
- Assumed office 9 April 2026
- Preceded by: Christian Estrosi

Mayor of Nice
- Incumbent
- Assumed office 27 March 2026
- Preceded by: Christian Estrosi

President of the Union of the Right for the Republic
- Incumbent
- Assumed office 3 October 2024
- Preceded by: Position established

President of the UDR group in the National Assembly
- Incumbent
- Assumed office 18 July 2024
- Preceded by: Office established

President of The Republicans
- In office 11 December 2022 – 22 September 2024
- Preceded by: Christian Jacob
- Succeeded by: Bruno Retailleau (2025)

Member of the National Assembly for Alpes-Maritimes's 1st constituency
- Incumbent
- Assumed office 20 June 2007
- Preceded by: Jérôme Rivière

President of the Departmental Council of Alpes-Maritimes
- In office 18 December 2008 – 15 September 2017
- Preceded by: Christian Estrosi
- Succeeded by: Charles Ange Ginésy

Personal details
- Born: 28 September 1965 (age 61) Nice, France
- Party: Union of the Right for the Republic (since 2012)
- Other political affiliations: Rally for the Republic (1981–2002); Union for a Popular Movement (2002–2015); The Republicans (2015–2024)
- Spouse: Caroline Magne
- Children: 3
- Education: Sciences Po

Éric Ciotti (French pronunciation: [eʁik sjɔti] or [eʁik tʃɔti], Italian: [ˈtʃɔtti]; born 28 September 1965) is a French politician who has served as the mayor of Nice since 2026. Ciotti led The Republicans (LR) from 2022 to 2024 and has represented Alpes-Maritimes's 1st constituency in the National Assembly since the 2007 legislative election. Once a member of The Republicans' right-wing, he sought to distance the party from Emmanuel Macron's presidency. He left The Republicans in 2024, and is now the leader of the Union of the Right for the Republic (UDR) party and its parliamentary group in the National Assembly.

Ciotti briefly served as First Deputy Mayor of Nice under Mayor Christian Estrosi in 2008, before he assumed the presidency of the Departmental Council of Alpes-Maritimes from 2008 to 2017. He sought the party's nomination for the 2022 presidential election at its 2021 congress; he unexpectedly placed first in the first round of voting, but was defeated by centre-right candidate Valérie Pécresse in the second round. In December 2022, following Pécresse's historic loss in the presidential election, he was elected president of The Republicans, placing first in the first round and winning the second round against Senator Bruno Retailleau, with whom he worked closely after he took office as leader.

In June 2024, after attempting to forge an electoral alliance with the far-right National Rally ahead of the snap election, he was unanimously, though contentiously, removed from his position as president by the party leadership, a move he described as "illegal". On 14 June, a Paris court invalidated the removal of Ciotti from the party presidency. This led to an unprecedented leadership crisis within the party, which culminated in Ciotti creating his own parliamentary group, the UDR, named after his Union of the Right for the Republic (UDR).

== Political career ==
=== Early career in local politics ===
Ciotti was elected to the General Council of Alpes-Maritimes in 2008 in Saint-Martin-Vésubie following the resignation of incumbent councillor Gaston Franco. He was elected by his peers to the body's presidency the same year, succeeding Nice Mayor Christian Estrosi. Ciotti had previously failed to be elected in the canton of Nice-1 in the 2008 cantonal election, having been defeated by incumbent Socialist Marc Concas. Following the 2015 departmental election, in which he was elected in Tourrette-Levens, the Departmental Council of Alpes-Maritimes replaced the General Council of Alpes-Maritimes. After the adoption of a new law organising cumul des mandats restrictions, Ciotti resigned the presidency in 2017 while keeping his councillor mandate.

=== Member of the National Assembly, 2007–present ===
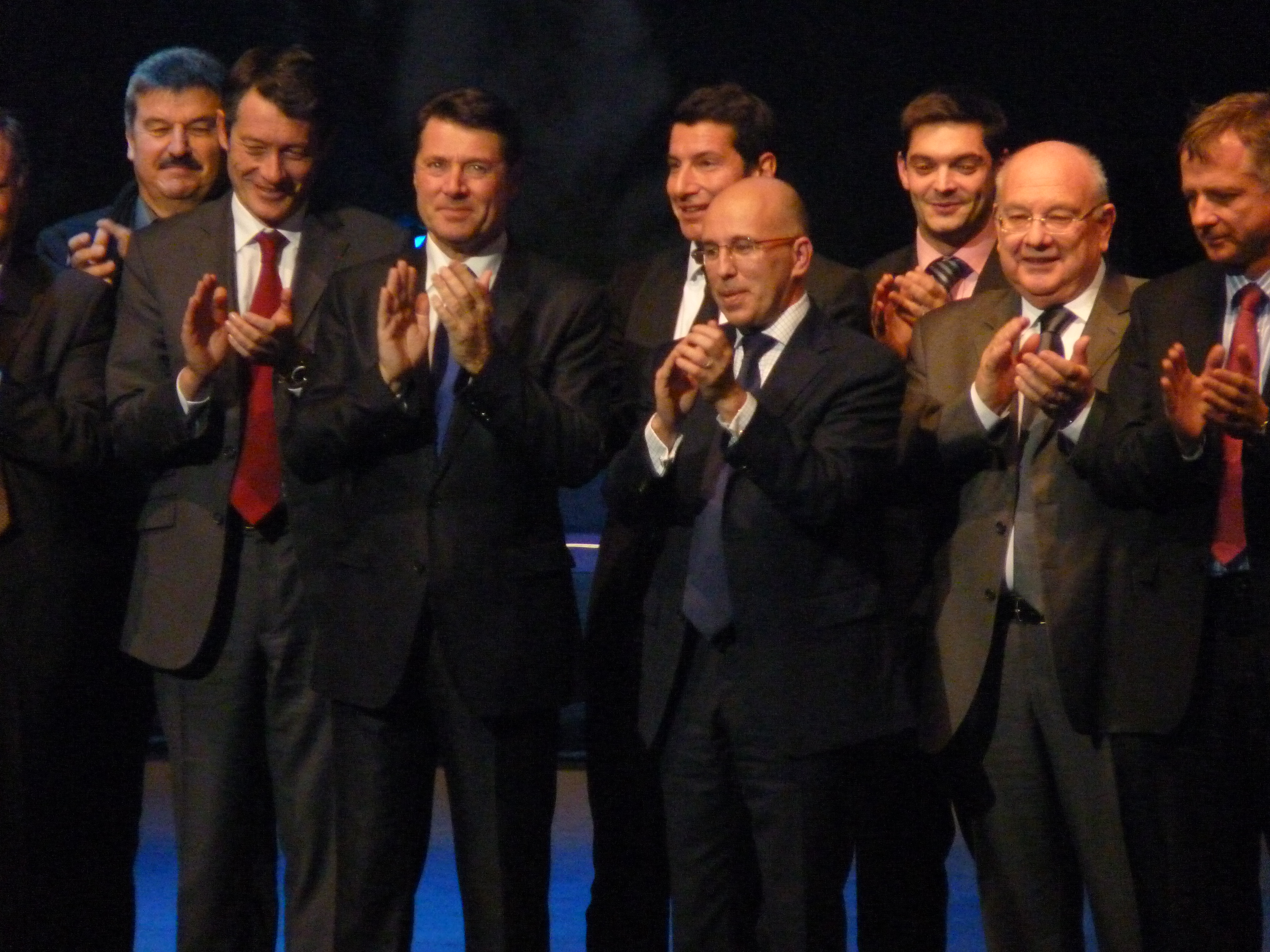
Nice Mayor Christian Estrosi and Éric Ciotti in 2011

Ciotti was elected to the National Assembly during the 2007 election; he was reelected in 2012 and 2017. In Parliament, Ciotti has been serving on the Committee on Legal Affairs since 2007. Since 2017, he has also been a quaestor and therefore part of the Assembly's Bureau in the 15th legislature of the French Fifth Republic, under the leadership of president Richard Ferrand. He recently recognized having had an affair with Nadine Morano while in office.

Ahead of the UMP's 2012 leadership election, Ciotti managed François Fillon's campaign. When Fillon's opponent Jean-François Copé eventually won, Ciotti was one of more than 50 party members who threatened to form a new centre-right caucus within the UMP parliamentary group under the leadership of Fillon. In September 2014, Ciotti joined Fillon, Étienne Blanc, Pierre Lellouche and Valérie Pécresse on an official trip to Iraq.

Ahead of The Republicans' 2016 primaries, Ciotti managed former President Nicolas Sarkozy's campaign for the presidential nomination, alongside Catherine Vautrin. Also in 2016, he formally requested that prosecutors investigate President François Hollande over a potential breach of security allowing revelations that Hollande disclosed classified information to journalists.

Amid the Fillon affair, Ciotti succeeded Gérald Darmanin as deputy of the Republicans' secretary general Bernard Accoyer and subsequently became a vocal defender of Fillon as the party's candidate for the 2017 presidential election. When magistrates put Fillon under formal investigation on suspicion of embezzling state funds, Ciotti publicly state "I trust and support Francois Fillon more than ever". When Fillon called on members to vote for Emmanuel Macron in the second round of the election against Marine Le Pen, Ciotti refused to endorse Macron.

In The Republicans' 2017 leadership election, Ciotti endorsed Laurent Wauquiez. In 2018, Wauquiez included him in his shadow cabinet; in this capacity, he served as opposition counterpart to Minister of the Interior Christophe Castaner. In 2020, Ciotti became the Parliament's rapporteur on how the government handled the COVID-19 pandemic in France. In 2021, Ciotti announced his intention to run as The Republicans's candidate in the 2022 presidential election. Ciotti narrowly placed first at the 2021 The Republicans congress and proceeded to the primary second round, in which he was defeated by Valérie Pécresse. Ciotti retained his seat in the second round of the 2024 French legislative election.

=== Leader of The Republicans, alliance crisis and departure ===
To the Right! (French: À Droite !, ÀD!), is a movement within The Republicans. The movement was founded by Ciotti during the 2021 The Republicans congress. Ciotti was elected with 53.7% of the votes against his main opponent, Bruno Retailleau, who received 46.3% to become the next leader of The Republicans. He ruled out a formal alliance with Macron's minority government in parliament, although he was open to negotiate a pension reform.

Ciotti was voted out as leader of the party on 12 June 2024 over his decision to seek an alliance with the far-right National Rally and was "unanimously" removed from the party, according to Annie Genevard. A Paris court reviewed the decision on 14 June and ruled in Ciotti's favor. His alliance with the RN was labeled the Union of the Far-Right. On 22 September 2024, Ciotti announced he would leave The Republicans, fully committing himself to his Union of the Right for the Republic (UDR) party.

=== Mayor of Nice, 2026–present ===
Ciotti ran for mayor of Nice in 2026, with the endorsement of the National Rally. He placed first in the first round with 43.43%, and defeated incumbent mayor Christian Estrosi in the second round with 48.54%. As mayor, he stated his opposition to the conversion of the Allianz Riviera stadium to become an ice hockey rink for the 2030 Winter Olympics, causing the ice events to be moved to Lyon.

== Political positions ==
Ciotti has largely been described as right-wing and of belonging in the right-wing populist faction of The Republicans.

=== Economic policy ===
On economic issues, Ciotti defends, as part of his candidacy for the primary of his party for the presidential election of 2022, the elimination of 250,000 positions in the civil service, the return to 39 hours as the legal duration of working time, raising the retirement age to 65, the lowering of corporate taxes, the abolition of inheritance tax as well as the reduction of unemployment benefits and social assistance.

During the protests against Emmanuel Macron's pension reforms, Ciotti's office in Nice was attacked. According to a photo posted by Ciotti to his Twitter account, the front window of the office had been broken with a paving stone and vandals wrote "the motion or the stone", in reference to an upcoming vote in the National Assembly. Protests against pension measures have taken place across the country, affecting various industries.

=== European policy ===
In 2019, Ciotti successfully added an amendment to an education bill to make it mandatory for classrooms to display both a French and European Union flag in all classrooms.

=== Foreign policy ===
During his presidential campaign in 2021, Ciotti argued that France should reassert itself by leaving NATO's integrated command. He claims an "immense admiration" for the state of Israel and wants the recognition of Jerusalem as the unified capital of that country, as well as the transfer of the French embassy in Israel from Tel Aviv to Jerusalem, in order to "break with a form of diplomatic tradition that is globally pro-Arab" of France.

=== Security and immigration policy ===
In 2020, Ciotti proposed a bill to the National Assembly which would prohibit the dissemination of images depicting functions of the national police, municipal police, military and customs officers; with a maximum penalty of 15,000 euros and a year in prison for violators.

For the Marianne magazine, Ciotti joined Marine Le Pen's positions on security, identity, immigration and Islamism, sharing with her "an ethnic and identity-based vision of the nation". He thus proposes to change the nationality code in order to abolish the jus soli in favour of the jus sanguinis alone, to include in the Constitution "our Christian origins", as well as to accentuate security policies (creation of 100,000 additional prison places, lowering of the criminal majority to 16 years, suppression of family allowances to "parents of children who do not respect the values of the Republic").

In 2021, Ciotti stated "our society is changing, if we have to talk about 'great replacement', I talk about 'replacement'." In the face of Islamic terrorism, he advocated the creation of a "French-style Guantanamo" and the adoption of "specially adapted laws, like the Patriot Act in the United States.

=== Relations with the far-right ===
In April 2021, Ciotti stated that "what differentiates [The Republicans] from the National Rally is our capacity to govern". In September 2021, Ciotti declared that if the second round of the French presidential election ended up being between Emmanuel Macron and Éric Zemmour, he would vote for the latter. Later that year, Renaud Muselier, the President of the Regional Council of Provence-Alpes-Côte d'Azur left the Republicans, saying that Ciotti was "conveying the ideas of Éric Zemmour within LR".

Ahead of the 2024 French legislative election, he called for The Republicans to enter into an electoral alliance with the National Rally. He was expelled from the party in response. This decision was subsequently recognised as illegal by the Judiciary Tribunal of Paris, re-instating him. Following the election, Ciotti said in an interview with Le Figaro that he was proud to have broken the "artificial" taboo against working with the far-right and predicted that the "vast majority of people on the right" would follow the same path.

== Other activities ==
- French Office for the Protection of Refugees and Stateless Persons (OFPRA), Member of the Board of Directors.
