= Michel Roumégoux =

French veterinarian and politician (1948–2023)

Deputy of the French National Assembly for Lot's 1st constituency
- In office 19 June 2002 – 19 June 2007
- Preceded by: Bernard Charles
- Succeeded by: Dominique Orliac

Mayor of Cahors
- In office 25 March 2001 – 2 January 2003
- Preceded by: Bernard Charles
- Succeeded by: Marc Lecuru

Member of the General Council of Lot
- In office 27 March 2011 – 29 March 2015
- Preceded by: Michel Quèbre
- Succeeded by: constituency abolished
- Constituency: Canton of Saint-Géry
- In office 23 March 1999 – 21 August 2002
- Preceded by: Bernard Delpech
- Succeeded by: Dominique Orliac
- Constituency: Canton of Cahors-Nord-Est
- In office 30 March 1992 – 22 March 1998
- Preceded by: Huguette Orliac
- Succeeded by: Bernard Delpech
- Constituency: Canton of Cahors-Nord-Est

Personal details
- Born: 10 January 1948 Figeac, France
- Died: 26 November 2023 (aged 75)
- Party: UDF; AC
- Occupation: Veterinarian

Michel Roumégoux (10 January 1948 – 26 November 2023) was a French veterinarian and politician of the Union for French Democracy (UDF) and the Centrist Alliance (AC).

== Biography ==
Born in Figeac on 10 January 1948, Roumégoux grew up in a family of artisan butchers. He became a veterinarian in Cahors in 1974 and later became an administrator of veterinary products.

A member of the UDF, Roumégoux was elected to the Municipal Council of Cahors in 1989 and re-elected in 1995. He was elected to the General Council of Lot in 1992, representing the Canton of Cahors-Nord-Est. He was defeated by Bernard Delpech in 1998 but got his revenge in a 1999 by-election, winning the seat back. In 2001, he was elected Mayor of Cahors, but his election was invalidated by the Conseil d'État due to improper campaign finance. His deputy, Marc Lecuru, served out his mandate until 2008.

In 2002, Roumégoux was elected to the National Assembly to represent Lot's 1st constituency. He joined the Union for a Popular Movement group and focused on providing support for foie gras, truffle growing, hunting, and the Dotation globale de fonctionnement. In 2007, he was defeated by Dominique Orliac of the Radical Party of the Left in the second round, obtaining 45.03% of the vote against her 54.97%. This came after his defeat in the 2004 cantonal elections.

In 2008, the Ministry of Agriculture tasked Roumégoux with creating a report on the future of the French wine industry up to 2020. He presented his report, titled Vin sur vin – 2020, on 16 April 2009 to Minister Michel Barnier. That month, he joined the Conseil national supérieur de l’œnotourisme, led by Paul Dubrule, who co-founded Accor. That same year, he founded Lot@venir. He then joined the Association nationale des élus de la vigne et du vin.

In a press conference in October 2010, Roumégoux announced his departure from the Union for a Popular Movement. He then joined the Centrist Alliance. In 2017, he announced his candidacy for the National Assembly constituency he previously represented, before withdrawing his name from consideration.

Michel Roumégoux died on 26 November 2023, at the age of 75.
