= Dominique Orliac =

French politician

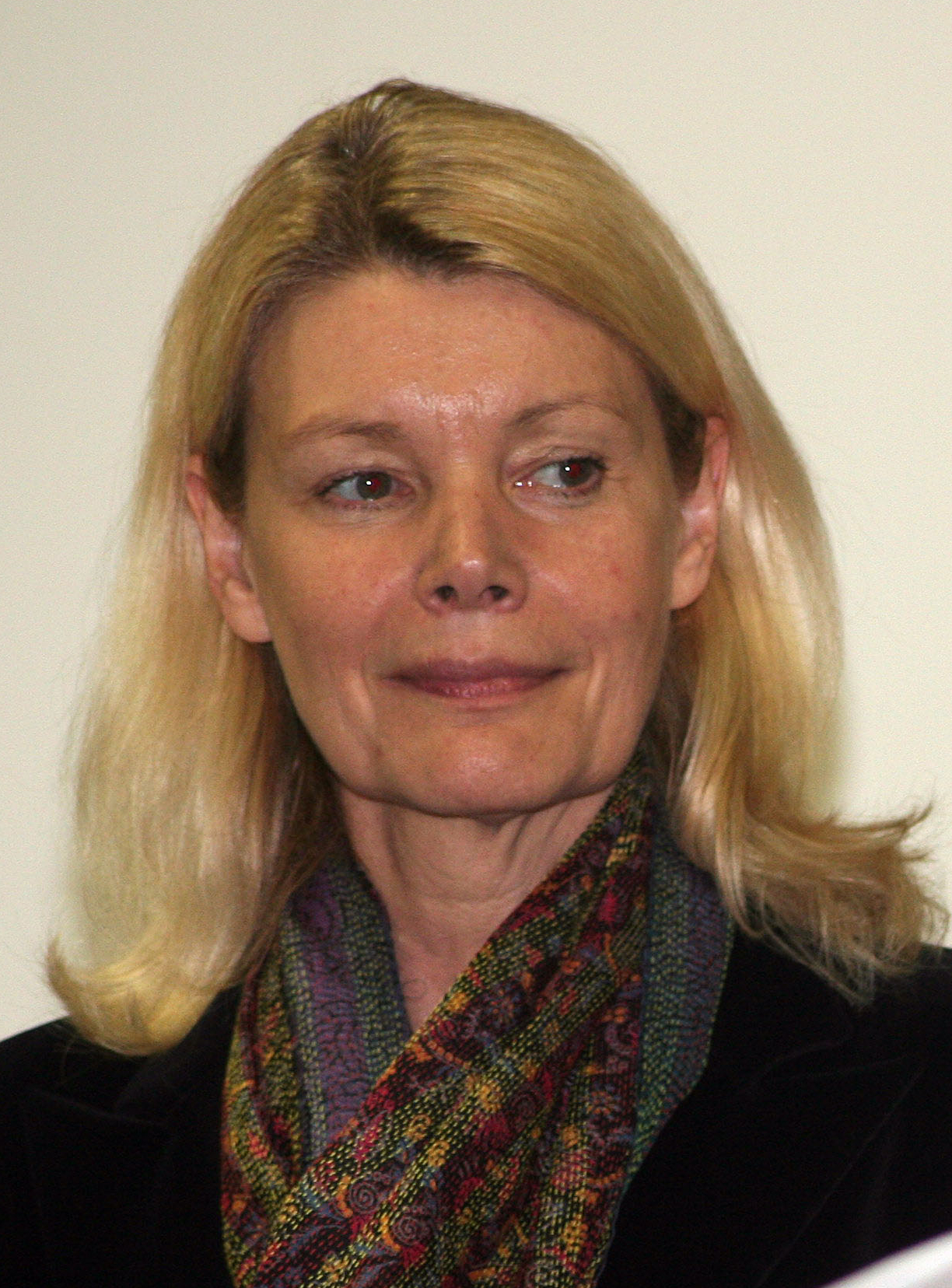
- Dominique Orliac in 2009

Member of the National Assembly for Lot's 1st constituency
- In office 19 June 2007 – 19 June 2017
- Preceded by: Michel Roumégoux
- Succeeded by: Aurélien Pradié

Personal details
- Born: Dominique Dian-Flon; 15 March 1952 (age 73); Palaiseau, France
- Political party: Radical Party of the Left
- Profession: Ophthalmologist

Dominique Orliac (born March 15, 1952, in Palaiseau, Essonne) was a member of the National Assembly of France. She represented the constituency of the Lot Département, and is a member of the Radical Party of the Left. She lost her seat in the 2017 Parliamentary Elections.
