= Aurélien Pradié =

French politician

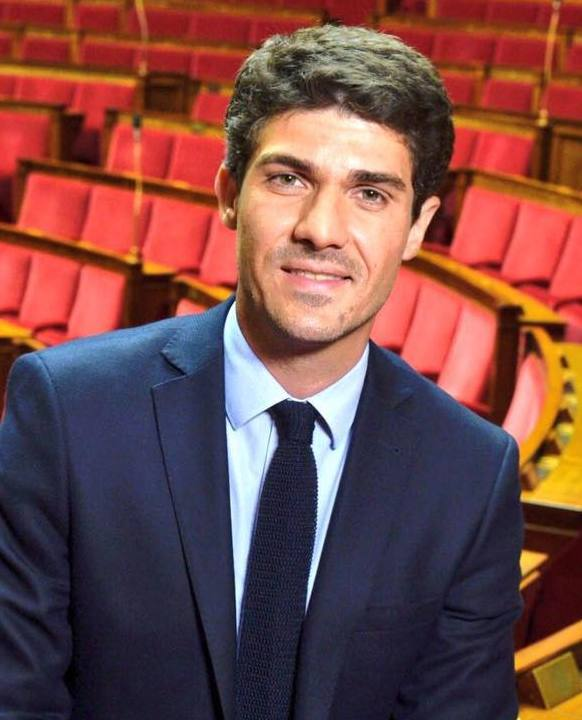
- Aurélien Pradié in 2017

Member of the National Assembly for Lot's 1st constituency
- Incumbent
- Assumed office 21 June 2017
- Preceded by: Dominique Orliac

Member of the Regional Council of Occitania
- Incumbent
- Assumed office 2 July 2021
- President: Carole Delga

Vice-President of The Republicans
- In office 18 January 2023 – 18 February 2023
- President: Éric Ciotti
- Preceded by: Annie Genevard
- Succeeded by: François-Xavier Bellamy

General Secretary of The Republicans
- In office 23 October 2019 – 18 January 2023
- President: Christian Jacob
- Preceded by: Annie Genevard
- Succeeded by: Annie Genevard

Mayor of Labastide-Murat
- In office 2014–2018

Personal details
- Born: 14 March 1986 (age 40) Cahors, France
- Party: UMP (Until 2015); The Republicans (2015–2024); Du courage (since 2024)
- Education: Toulouse 1 University Capitole
- Website: aurelienpradie.fr

Aurélien Pradié (French pronunciation: [oʁeljɛ̃ pʁadje]; born 14 March 1986) is a French politician who has represented the 1st constituency of the Lot department in the National Assembly since 2017. He has also held a seat in the Regional Council of Occitania since 2021, previously in office from 2016 to 2018. In addition to his work in Parliament, he was appointed secretary-general of The Republicans (LR) in 2019 after Christian Jacob was elected party leader, making him its third highest-ranking politician.

== Early life and education ==
Pradié was born on 14 March 1986 in Cahors to parents who managed a small nut business. He has a younger brother who is a baker. After a stroke, his father became a paraplegic. Pradié has said that this moment "forged his commitment" to public service, notably on issues related to the handicapped.

Pradié studied law at Toulouse 1 University Capitole. He worked for the Andros company in Lot under CEO Frédéric Gervoson.

== Political career ==
=== Early beginnings ===
Beginning in 2007, he served as president of the UMP's youth wing in Lot.

=== Local politics ===
In the 2008 cantonal elections, Pradié was elected in the first round for the canton of Labastide-Murat, becoming the second-youngest councilor in France behind Jean Sarkozy and beating Lucien-Georges Foissac, his former teacher. His campaign, which he led on his Moped, was atypical for local election campaigns.

In 2011, Xavier Bertrand, Minister of Labour, appointed him to look at youth employment.

In 2012, at age 26, Pradié ran as a candidate for the UMP in Lot's 1st constituency. With 40% of the vote in the second round, he was defeated by the incumbent MP Dominique Orliac (PRG). His campaign spending accounts were rejected by the Constitutional Council, which made him ineligible to run again for a year.

In the 2014 municipal elections, Pradié was elected mayor of Labastide-Murat, when his party list received over 70% of the vote. He was elected immediate thereafter as president of the Community of Communes for Causse de Labastide-Murat. In this role, he helped open a health centre in the Communes of Labastide-Murat. Following the merger of communities, he became mayor of Cœur-de-Causse (the new merged commune) in 2016.

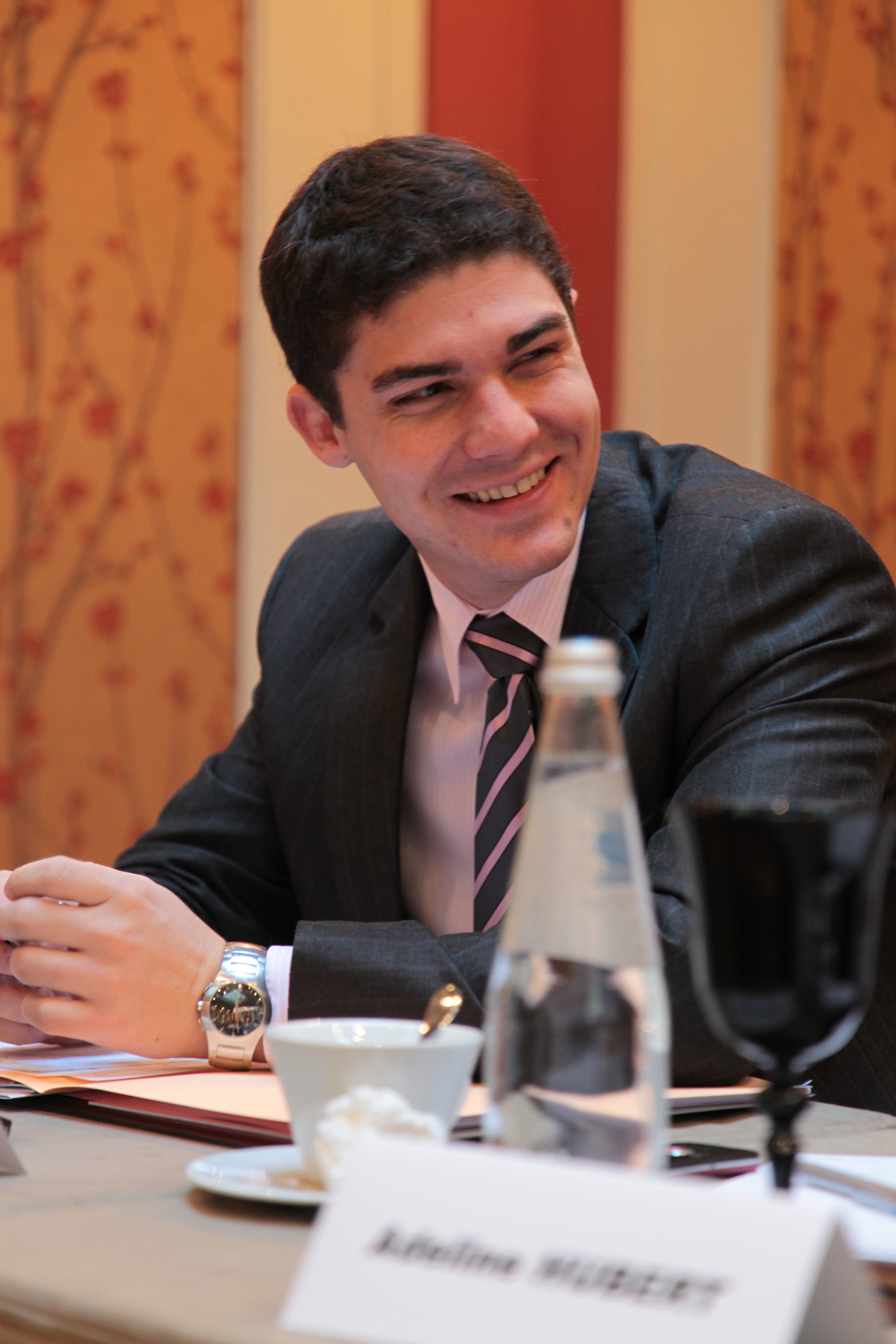
Pradié in 2009

During the electoral redistricting that took place before departmental elections in 2015, the former canton of Labastide-Murat was cut in two and part of the canton was amalgamated into the larger Canton of Causse et Vallées, which included 47 other communes. Pradié criticised the new redistricting, saying it was done to make it more difficult for him to be elected, and declined to run again in the new district. That same year, he was elected a regional councilor in Occitanie, where he sat on the committee for labor, professional development and apprenticeships.

On January 5, 2018, following French law against holding cumulative mandates, he resigned from his positions as mayor, president of the Community of Communes and as Regional Councilor. However, he remained a municipal and community councilor. He was succeeded by Brigitte Rivière as a regional councillor.

=== Member of the National Assembly, 2017–present ===
In June 2016, Pradié was nominated by The Republicans in Lot's 1st constituency for the 2017 elections. In the first round, he received 24% of the vote, going up against Sébastien Maurel of La République en marche in the second round. Pradié beat Maurel in the second round with 51.3% of the vote, supported by strong results in rural parts of the district. His election made him the youngest MP in the history of Lot and came as a surprise in an area that has historically voted for left-wing parties.

In parliament, Pradié has since been serving on the Committee on Legal Affairs. From 2018 until 209, he was also a member of the Committee on Cultural Affairs and Education. In addition to his committee assignments, he chairs the French-Afghan Parliamentary Friendship Group and is a member of the French-Lebanese Parliamentary Friendship Group.

Pradié supported Laurent Wauquiez for the 2017 leadership campaign, nominating him on the final ballot. He then became a member of the internal faction known as « Les Populaires », launched by Guillaume Peltier within Les Républicains. In November 2018, Pradié joined the Shadow cabinet of Laurent Wauquiez, in charge of disability issues and solidarity.

In October 2019, after Christian Jacob became leader of The Republicans, Pradié became Secretary-General of the party.

In October 2018, Pradié defended a bill in the National Assembly in favor of better inclusion of handicapped children and adolescents in public schools. This bill would have included better status for the students and their caregivers on campus and had widespread political support, but was rejected by La République En Marche!.

On December 8, 2018, Pradié launched the first "Citizens Council of Lot" in Cahors, as he promised to do during his election campaign.

AAt the Republicans' national convention in December 2021, Pradié was part of the 11-member committee which oversaw the party's selection of its candidate for the 2022 presidential elections. He also served as one of the six spokespersons for the LR candidate, Valérie Pécresse.

In 2023, the Republicans' leadership dismissed Pradié as deputy party leader, after he had failed to join the party in backing President Emmanuel Macron's plan to raise the retirement age.

== Political positions ==
Pradié has described himself as being on the sensible right, close to the ideologies of predecessors President of France like Jacques Chirac and Georges Pompidou. A member of the Georges Pompidou Institute, he joined the scientific council of the Jacques Chirac Foundation in April 2018.

In July 2019, Pradié voted against the French ratification of the European Union's Comprehensive Economic and Trade Agreement (CETA) with Canada.

== Recognition ==
In February 2020, Pradié received the "MP of the Year" award from political organization Le Trombinoscope.
