= Annie Genevard =

French politician (born 1956)

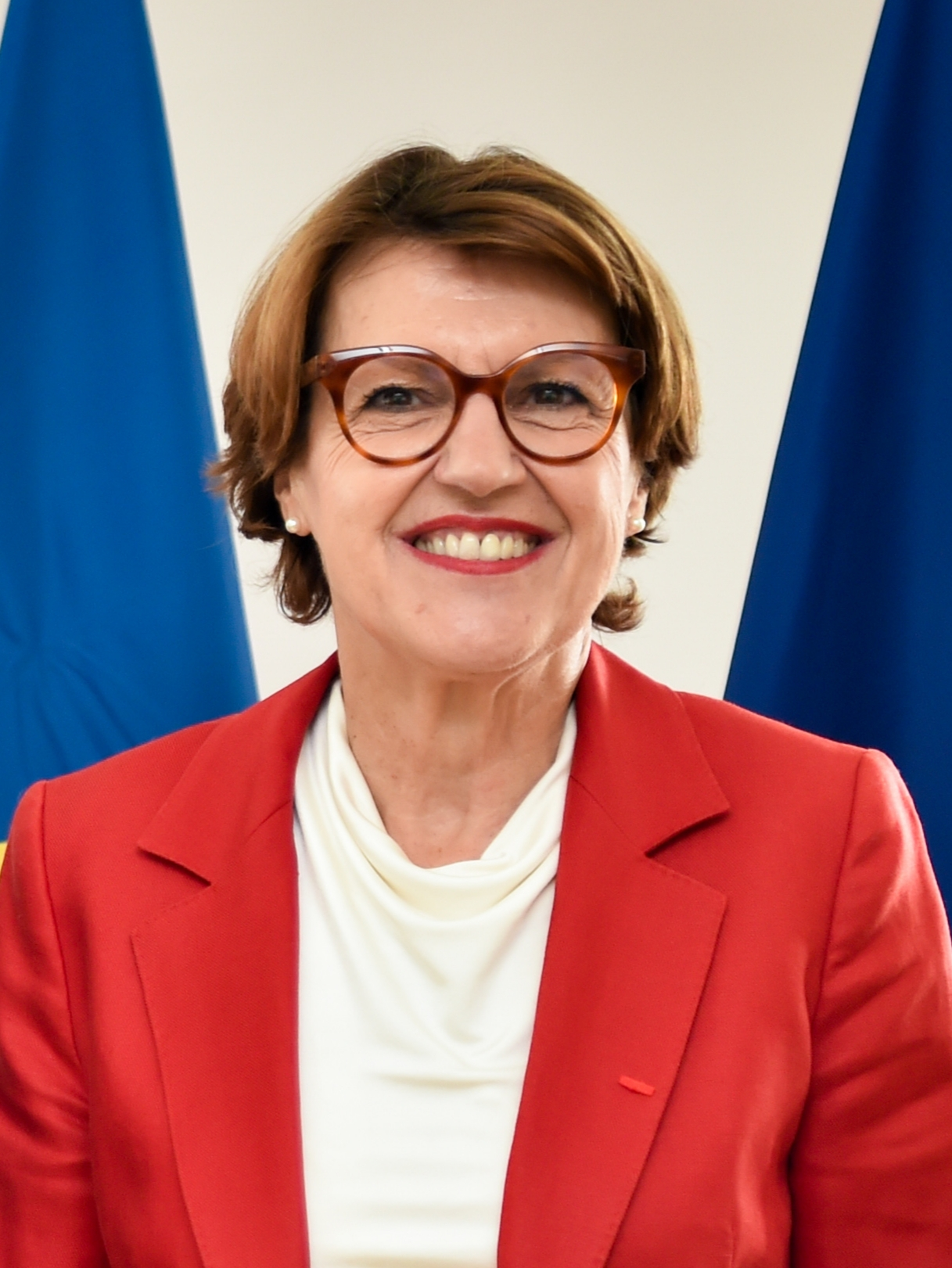
- Genevard in 2025

Minister of Agriculture and Food Sovereignty
- Incumbent
- Assumed office 21 September 2024
- Prime Minister: Michel Barnier; François Bayrou; Sébastien Lecornu
- Preceded by: Marc Fesneau

Member of the National Assembly for Doubs's 5th constituency
- In office 20 June 2012 – 22 October 2024
- Preceded by: Jean-Marie Binetruy
- Succeeded by: Éric Liégeon

Secretary-General of The Republicans
- In office 18 January 2023 – 21 May 2025
- President: Éric Ciotti
- Preceded by: Aurélien Pradié
- Succeeded by: Othman Nasrou
- In office 13 December 2017 – 23 October 2019
- President: Laurent Wauquiez
- Preceded by: Bernard Accoyer
- Succeeded by: Aurélien Pradié

Mayor of Morteau
- In office 20 June 2002 – 21 July 2017
- Preceded by: Jean-Marie Binetruy
- Succeeded by: Cédric Bole

Personal details
- Born: Annie Marguerite Alice Tharin; 7 September 1956 (age 70) Audincourt, France
- Party: Independent (2025–present)
- Other political affiliations: RPR (1996–2002); UMP (2002–2015); LR (since 2025)
- Spouse: Dominique Genevard (m. 1983)
- Children: 2
- Parent: Irène Tharin (mother)
- Education: University of Franche-Comté
- Occupation: Teacher • Politician

Annie Marguerite Alice Genevard (French pronunciation: [ani ʒən(ə)vaʁ]; née Tharin, 7 September 1956) is a French politician who has served as Minister of Agriculture and Food Sovereignty in the successive governments of Prime Ministers Michel Barnier, François Bayrou and Sébastien Lecornu since 2024.

Genevard has represented the 5th constituency of the Doubs department in the National Assembly since 2012. In addition to her parliamentary service, she has been secretary-general of The Republicans (LR) under party leaders Laurent Wauquiez (2017–2019) and Éric Ciotti (2023–present). From 4 July 2022 until 11 December 2022, she was the ad interim party leader following the resignation of Christian Jacob, in her role as first party vice president (French: vice-présidente déléguée), which she had held since 6 July 2021.

A teacher by occupation, Genevard was also Mayor of Morteau from 2002 until 2017.

== Family ==
A native of Audincourt, Genevard is the daughter of Irène Tharin, who served in the National Assembly from 2002 to 2007, representing the fourth constituency of Doubs as a member of the Union for a Popular Movement, which would be renamed The Republicans in 2015. She also was the Mayor of Seloncourt from 1993 until 2015.

== Political career ==
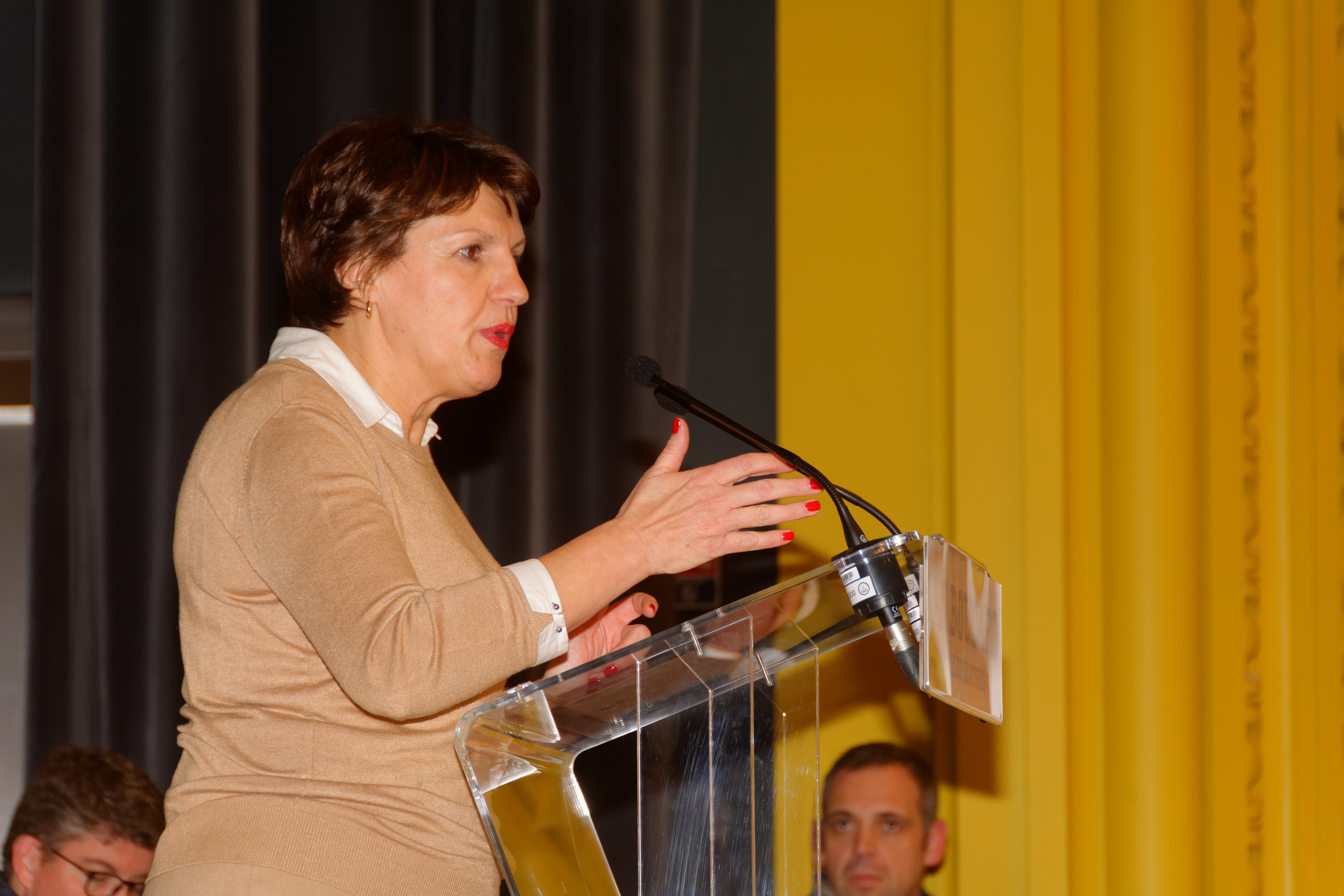
Genevard campaigning as party secretary-general for the 2018 Territoire de Belfort's 1st constituency by-election

=== Member of the National Assembly, 2012–2024 ===
Genevard first became a member of the National Assembly since the 2012 legislative election, when she succeeded Jean-Marie Binetruy, whom she also succeeded as Mayor of Morteau when he entered the National Assembly. She has since been one of the chamber's six vice presidents under the leadership of François de Rugy (2017–2018) and Richard Ferrand (since 2018). She also served on the Committee on Cultural Affairs and Education. In addition to her committee assignments, she was a member of the study group on the Holy See.

In the 2016 The Republicans primary ahead of the 2017 presidential election, Genevard endorsed François Fillon as the party's candidate for President of France.

In the party's 2017 leadership election, Genevard endorsed Laurent Wauquiez as party president. Following his election, she was appointed as the party's secretary-general. She left the position in 2019, as newly elected party president Christian Jacob appointed Aurélien Pradié to succeed her.

At The Republicans' national convention in December 2021, she was part of the 11-member committee which oversaw the party's selection of its candidate for the 2022 presidential elections.

From July to December 2022, Genevard served as the Republicans’ interim chairwoman after the resignation of Christian Jacob. She declined to run in the party's leadership election and was succeeded by Éric Ciotti in December. In January 2023, Ciotti appointed her to serve again as the party's secretary-general.

=== Career in government ===
Genevard was appointed minister of agriculture and food sovereignty in Michel Barnier's government on 21 September 2024. She retained the position in François Bayrou's government on 23 December 2024 and later in the first and second governments of Sébastien Lecornu.

== See also ==
- 2017 French legislative election
