= Regional Council of Occitania =

Regional Council of Occitania Conseil régional d'Occitanie
- Flag of Région Occitanie

Type
- Type: Regional council

History
- Preceded by: Regional council of Midi-Pyrénées; Regional council of Languedoc-Roussillon

Leadership
- President: Carole Delga, PS since 4 January 2016

Structure
- Seats: 158
- Political groups: Majority (109): Socialist Party (69); Radical Party of the Left (18); French Communist Party (15); Miscellaneous ecologists (7); Opposition (49): National Rally (28); The Republicans (21)

Elections
- Voting system: Two-round list proportional representation system with majority bonus
- Last election: 20 and 27 June 2021
- Next election: 2028

Meeting place
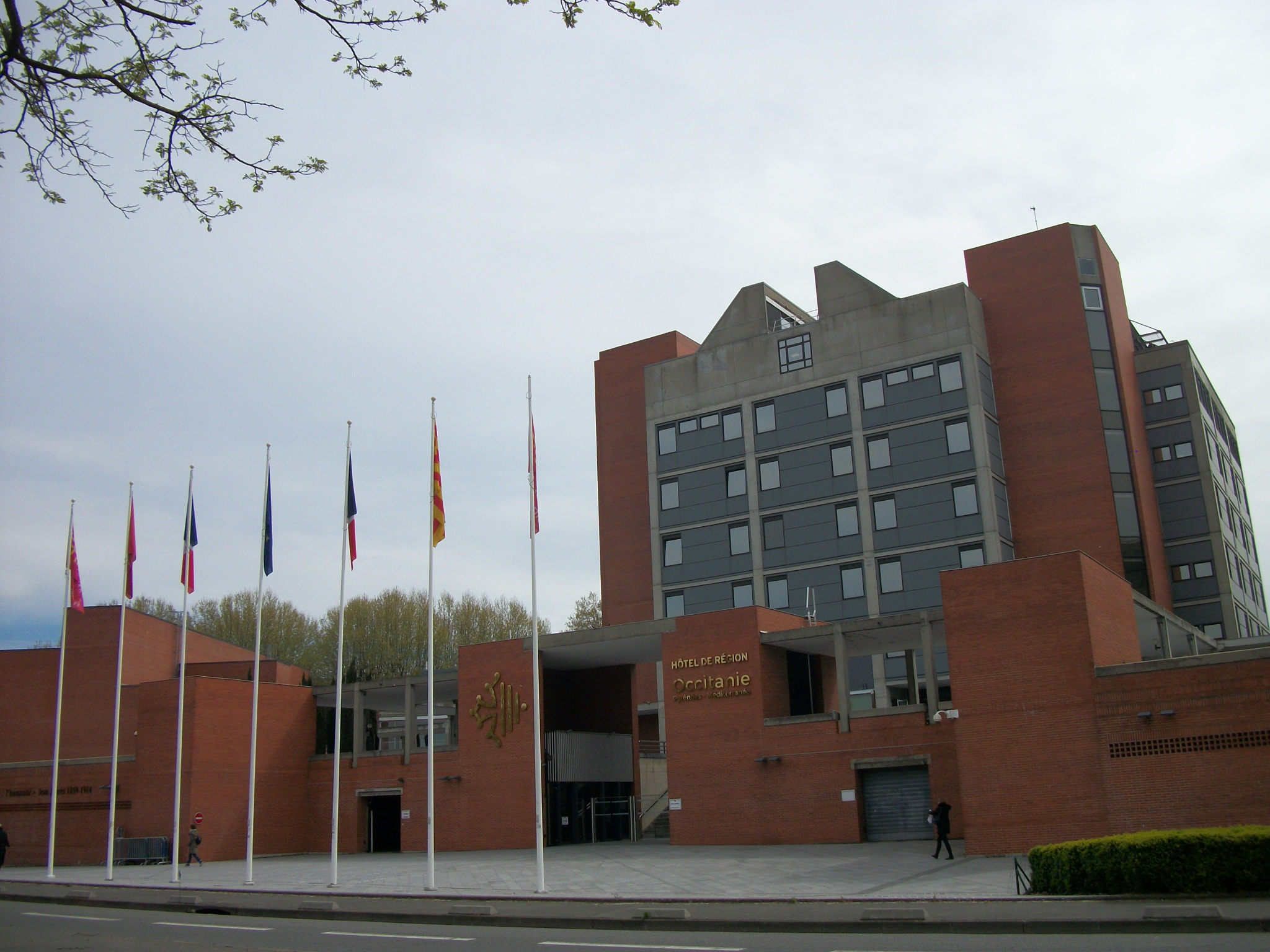
- Seat in Toulouse.
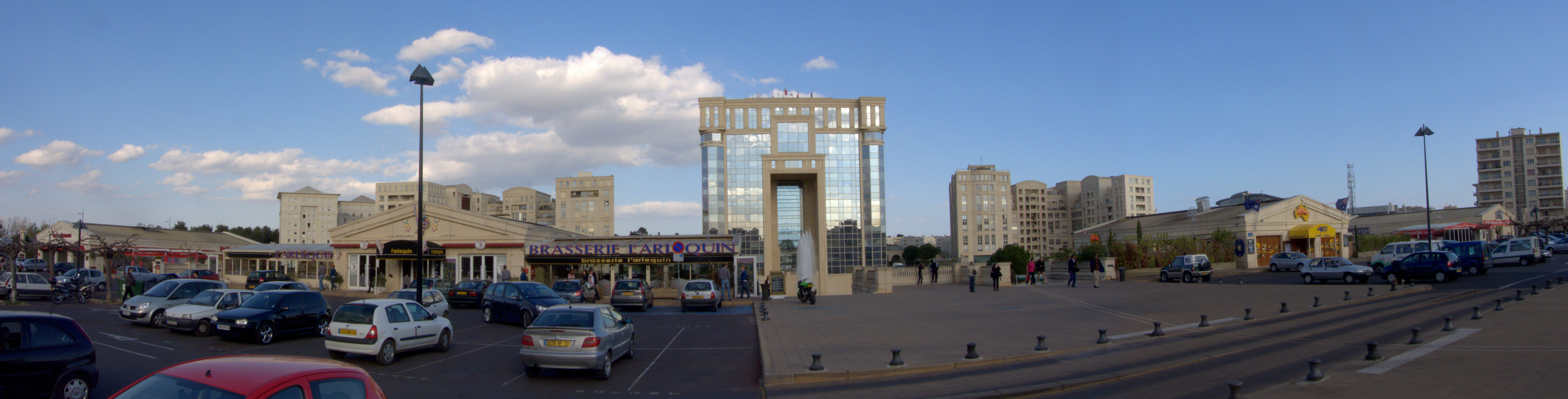
- Seat of sessions in Montpellier.

Website
- www.laregion.fr

The Regional Council of Occitania (French: Conseil régional d'Occitanie, Occitan: Conselh regional d'Occitània) is the deliberative assembly of the region of Occitania, the southernmost administrative region of metropolitan France excluding Corsica. Carole Delga of the Socialist Party is the current president of the regional council, elected on 4 January 2016, following the regional elections on 6 and 13 December 2015.

== Presidents ==
Name	Party	Period	
Martin Malvy	PS	1 January 2016	4 January 2016
Carole Delga	PS	4 January 2016	

== 2021 elections ==
2021 Regional elections in Occitania
Candidate	List	First round		Second round		Seats	+/-
Candidate	List	Votes	%	Votes	%	Seats	+/-
Carole Delga *	PS-PRG-PCF-GRS	597,157	39.57	882,116	57.77	109	+32
Jean-Paul Garraud	LDP-RN	341,254	22.61	366,467	24.00	28	-12
Aurélien Pradié	LR-UDI-LMR	183,980	12.19	278,258	18.22	21	-4
Antoine Maurice	EÉLV-G.s-CÉ-GÉ-POC-MEI	133,383	8.84			0	-11
Vincent Terrail-Novès	LREM-MoDem-Agir	132,487	8.78			0	New
Myriam Martin	LFI-NPA	76,381	5.06			0	-5
Malena Adrada	LO	26,720	1.77			0	0
Jean-Luc Davezac	OPN-RES	11,510	0.76			0	New
Anthony Le Boursicaud	DIV	6,209	0.41			0	New
Valid votes		1,509,081	96.03	1,526,841	95.61		
Blank ballots		36,176	2.30	40,730	2.55		
Null Ballots		26,262	1.67	29,375	1.84		
Turnout		1,571,519	37.24	1,596,946	37.83	158	Steady
Abstentions		2,648,964	62.76	2,623,888	62.17		
Registered voters		4,220,483	100	4,220,834	100		
