= Gironde's 10th constituency =

Constituency of the National Assembly of France

10th constituency of Gironde
- inline Constituency of the National Assembly of France

- Location of constituency in Department

- Location of Gironde in France
- Deputy: Florent Boudié; RE
- Department: Gironde
- Cantons: (pre-2015) Branne, Castillon-la-Bataille, Fronsac, Libourne, Lussac, Pellegrue, Pujols, Sainte-Foy-la-Grande.

The 10th constituency of the Gironde (French: Dixième circonscription de la Gironde) is a French legislative constituency in Gironde département. Like the other 576 French constituencies, it elects one MP using the two-round system, with a run-off if no candidate receives over 50% of the vote in the first round.

== Historical representation ==
Election	Member	Party
1988	Gilbert Mitterrand	PS
1993	Gilbert Mitterrand	PS
1997	Gilbert Mitterrand	PS
2002	Jean-Paul Garraud	UMP
2007	Jean-Paul Garraud	UMP
2012	Florent Boudié	PS
2017	Florent Boudié	LREM
2022	Florent Boudié	RE
2024		RE

== Election results ==
=== 2024 ===
Candidate	Party	Alliance	First round			Second round		
Candidate	Party	Alliance	Votes	%	+/–	Votes	%	+/–
Sandrine Chadourne	RN		25,037	43.80	+15.77	26,555	47.83	+1.09
Florent Boudié	RE	Ensemble	17,128	29.96	-2.74	28,960	52.17	-1.09
Pascal Bourgois	LE	NFP	13,885	24.29	+0.89			
Hélène Halbin	LO		1,117	1.95	+0.73			
Votes			57,167	100.00		55,515	100.00	
Valid votes			57,167	96.83	-0.52	55,515	94.53	+4.59
Blank votes			1,267	2.15	+0.32	2,365	4.03	-3.22
Null votes			605	1.02	+0.21	847	1.44	-1.24
Turnout			59,039	70.63	+19.46	58,727	70.23	+21.22
Abstentions			24,550	29.37	-19.46	24,893	29.77	-21.22
Registered voters			83,589			83,620		
Result			RE HOLD					

=== 2022 ===
Legislative Election 2022: Gironde's 10th constituency
Party	Candidate	Votes	%	±%
LREM (Ensemble)	Florent Boudié	13,565	32.70	-7.57
RN	Sandrine Chadourne	11,628	28.03	+12.14
EELV (NUPÉS)	Pascal Bourgois	9,705	23.40	+1.41
REC	Gonzague Malherbe	2,582	6.22	N/A
PRG	Veronique Raymond Planton	2,034	4.90	N/A
Others	N/A	1,968	4.74	
Turnout		41,482	51.17	−0.30
2nd round result
LREM (Ensemble)	Florent Boudié	19,581	53.26	-14.64
RN	Sandrine Chadourne	17,185	46.74	+14.64
Turnout		36,766	49.01	+4.34
LREM hold				

=== 2017 ===
Candidate	Label	First round		Second round	
Candidate	Label	Votes	%	Votes	%
Florent Boudié	REM	16,408	40.27	21,772	67.90
Sandrine Chadourne	FN	6,474	15.89	10,295	32.10
Jean-Paul Garraud	LR	6,323	15.52		
Eloïse Bajou	FI	5,370	13.18		
Antoine Garanto	PS	2,014	4.94		
Agnès Séjournet	ECO	1,576	3.87		
Charles Pouvreau	UDI	1,366	3.35		
Julien Delamorte	DLF	473	1.16		
Gaëlle Génin	EXG	306	0.75		
Jacqueline Moulard	DIV	244	0.60		
Nolwenn Lamothe	DIV	186	0.46		
Votes		40,740	100.00	32,067	100.00
Valid votes		40,740	97.95	32,067	88.85
Blank votes		478	1.15	2,624	7.27
Null votes		376	0.90	1,400	3.88
Turnout		41,594	51.47	36,091	44.67
Abstentions		39,213	48.53	44,708	55.33
Registered voters		80,807		80,799	
Source: Ministry of the Interior

=== 2012 ===
2012 legislative election in Gironde's 10th constituency
Candidate	Party	First round		Second round	
Candidate	Party	Votes	%	Votes	%
Florent Boudie	PS	17,313	36.96%	24,992	54.60%
Jean-Paul Garraud	UMP	15,094	32.22%	20,785	45.40%
Anne-Christine Royal	FN	7,374	15.74%		
Marie-Laurence Arnaud	FG	2,654	5.67%		
Pascal Bourgois	EELV	1,519	3.24%		
Marie-Thérèse Alonso	AEI	952	2.03%		
François Mas	MRC	776	1.66%		
Françoise Lorblancher	PCD	276	0.59%		
Francisca Loembet	DLR	258	0.55%		
Virginie Dole	NPA	257	0.55%		
Monique Oratto	LO	192	0.41%		
Marie-José Marcelli	UDN	175	0.37%		
Laurent Ignace Saint-Huile		0	0.00%		
Valid votes		46,840	98.25%	45,777	96.31%
Spoilt and null votes		835	1.75%	1,753	3.69%
Votes cast / turnout		47,675	60.70%	47,530	60.51%
Abstentions		30,873	39.30%	31,021	39.49%
Registered voters		78,548	100.00%	78,551	100.00%

=== 2007 ===
Legislative Election 2007: Gironde's 10th constituency
Party	Candidate	Votes	%	±%
UMP	Jean-Paul Garraud	21,887	44.66	
PS	Philippe Buisson	15,268	31.36	
MoDem	Josette Daniel	2,641	5.39	
FN	Anne-Christine Royal	2,545	5.19	
LV	Joël Rousset	1,629	3.32	
Far left	Pierre Guilloneau	1,206	2.46	
CPNT	Laurent Philippot	1,146	2.34	
PCF	Patrick Aubisse	1,058	2.16	
Others	N/A	1,529		
Turnout		49,969	63.58	
2nd round result
UMP	Jean-Paul Garraud	25,317	51.44	
PS	Philippe Buisson	23,904	48.56	
Turnout		50,768	64.60	
UMP hold				

=== 2002 ===
Legislative Election 2002: Gironde's 10th constituency
Party	Candidate	Votes	%	±%
PS	Gilbert Mitterrand	17,240	34.96	
UMP	Jean-Paul Garraud	11,952	24.24	
UDF	Jean-Francois Lacrouts	6,788	13.77	
FN	Michel Tricot	5,171	10.49	
CPNT	Michel Massias	1,904	3.86	
DVD	Christophe Robin	1,328	2.69	
PCF	Patrick Aubisse	1,083	2.20	
Others	N/A	3,846		
Turnout		50,375	67.81	
2nd round result
UMP	Jean-Paul Garraud	23,941	51.16	
PS	Gilbert Mitterrand	22,855	48.84	
Turnout		48,786	65.68	
UMP gain from PS				

=== 1997 ===
Legislative Election 1997: Gironde's 10th constituency
Party	Candidate	Votes	%	±%
PS	Gilbert Mitterrand	19,592	39.61	
RPR	Jean-Claude Bireau	15,300	30.93	
FN	Jean-Marcel Labegorre	6,980	14.11	
PCF	Annie Namin	3,470	7.02	
LV	Joël Rousset	1,385	2.80	
MEI	Marie-Thérèse Roberti	1,331	2.69	
Others	N/A	1,405		
Turnout		52,079	72.15	
2nd round result
PS	Gilbert Mitterrand	28,818	55.76	
RPR	Jean-Claude Bireau	22,865	44.24	
Turnout		54,785	75.93	
PS hold				
