= Cantons of the Lot department =

The following is a list of the 17 cantons of the Lot department, in France, following the French canton reorganisation which came into effect in March 2015:

- Cahors-1
- Cahors-2
- Cahors-3
- Causse et Bouriane
- Causse et Vallées
- Cère et Ségala
- Figeac-1
- Figeac-2
- Gourdon
- Gramat
- Lacapelle-Marival
- Luzech
- Marches du Sud-Quercy
- Martel
- Puy-l'Évêque
- Saint-Céré
- Souillac
