= Jean-Marie Binetruy =

French politician (born 1946)

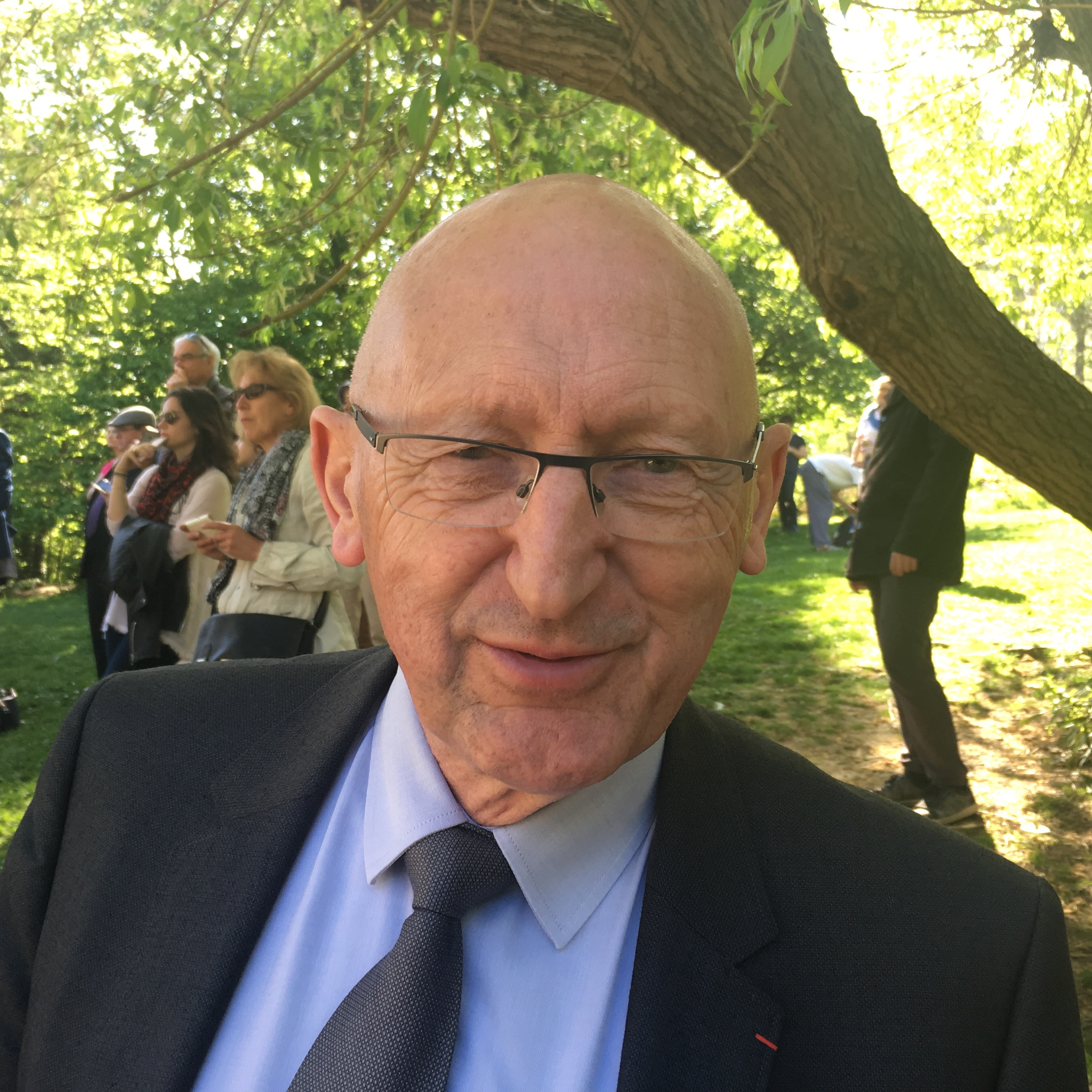

Member of the National Assembly for Doubs's 5th constituency
- In office 16 June 2002 – 19 June 2012
- Preceded by: Roland Vuillaume
- Succeeded by: Annie Genevard

Mayor of Morteau
- In office 19 June 1995 – 20 June 2002
- Preceded by: Pierre Cheval
- Succeeded by: Annie Genevard

Personal details
- Born: 17 July 1946 (age 79) Villers-le-Lac, France
- Party: Rally for the Republic (until 2002); Union for a Popular Movement (2002–2015); The Republicans (since 2015)
- Occupation: Teacher

Jean-Marie Binetruy (born 17 July 1946) is a French politician who served as the member of the National Assembly for the fifth constituency of Doubs from 2002 to 2012. A member of the Rally for the Republic (RPR) until 2002, he then joined the newly-established Union for a Popular Movement (UMP) before it became The Republicans (LR) in 2015.

== Career ==
A native of Villers-le-Lac, Binetruy is a teacher by occupation. Prior to his tenure as a parliamentarian, he was elected Mayor of Morteau in 1995 and reelected in 2001. He then served two terms in the National Assembly upon his election in 2002 and reelection in 2007. He remained a municipal councillor in Morteau until 2020.
