= Florent Boudié =

French politician (born 1973)

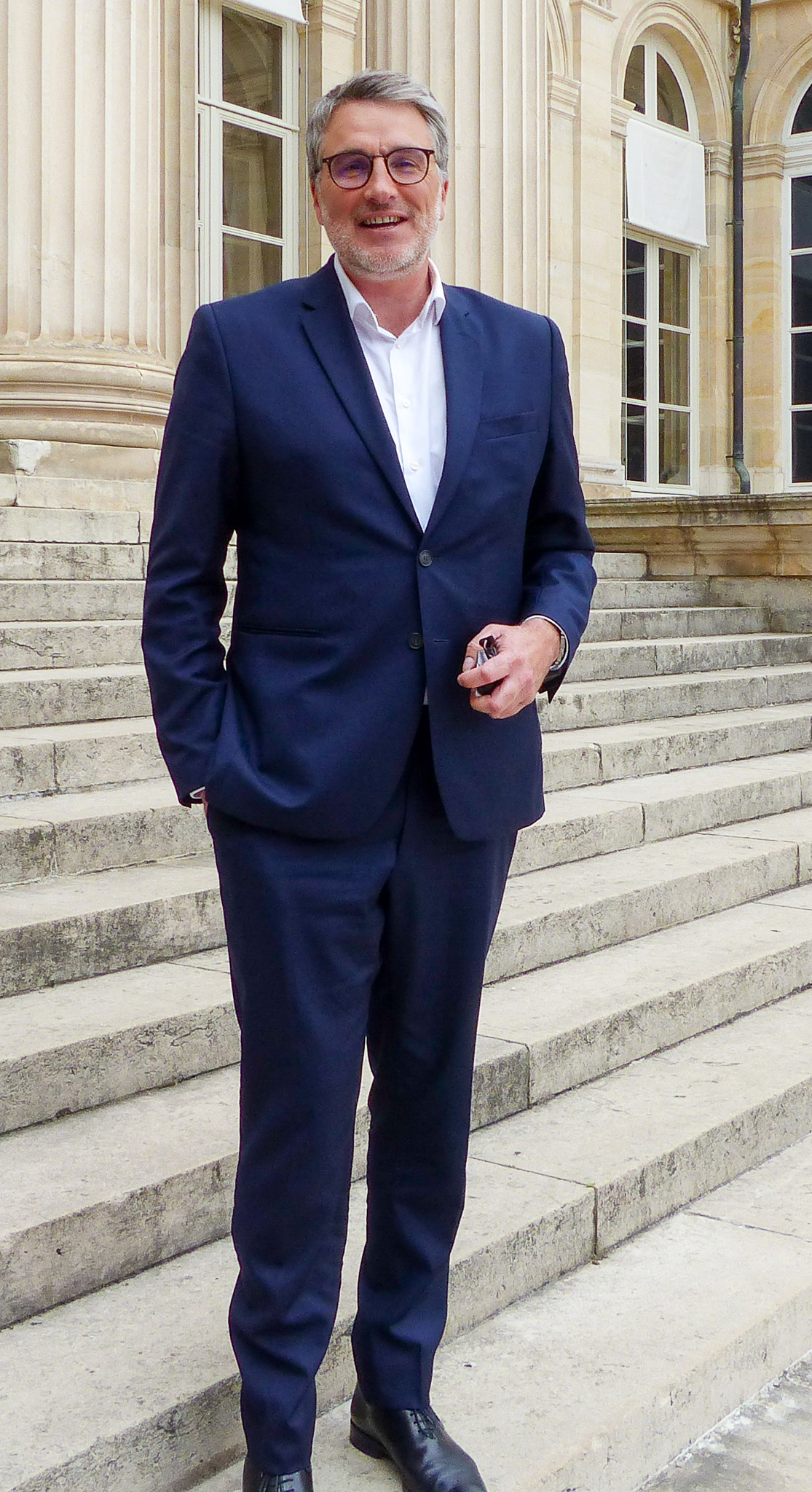

President of the Law Committee of the National Assembly
- Incumbent
- Assumed office 20 July 2024
- Preceded by: Sacha Houlié

Member of the National Assembly for Gironde's 10th constituency
- Incumbent
- Assumed office 20 June 2012
- Preceded by: Jean-Paul Garraud

Member of the Regional Council of Nouvelle-Aquitaine
- Incumbent
- Assumed office 4 January 2016

Personal details
- Born: 22 September 1973 (age 52) Sainte-Foy-la-Grande, France
- Party: Renaissance (2016–present)
- Other political affiliations: Socialist Party (until 2016)
- Education: Institut d'études politiques de Bordeaux

Florent Boudié (born 22 September 1973) is a French politician who has represented the 10th constituency of the Gironde department in the National Assembly since 2012. A former member of the Socialist Party (PS), he joined La République En Marche! (LREM, later Renaissance, RE) in 2016.

== Early life and education ==
Boudié was born to a father who was a member of the French Resistance. He went to college at the Institut d'études politiques de Bordeaux from 1990 to 1994.

== Political career ==
Boudié was originally elected in 2012, then as a member of the Socialist Party. He was re-elected on 18 June 2017, this time representing LREM.

In parliament, Boudié serves on the Committee on Legal Affairs. In this capacity, he was the parliament's rapporteur on a 2018 Asylum and Immigration Law and 2021 legislation on regulating Islam in France.

In addition to his committee assignments, Boudié is a member of the French-Senegalese Parliamentary Friendship Group. He also represents the parliament on the Legislation and Financial Regulation Advisory Committee (CCLRF) at the Bank of France.

In early 2018, Boudié set up an informal parliamentary working group on Islam in order to contribute to the government's bill aimed at better organising and supervising the financing of the Muslim faith in France.

In July 2019, Boudié stood as a candidate for the position as chair of the LREM parliamentary group; in the vote, he came in second after Gilles Le Gendre who was re-elected in the first round. Since 2020, he has been part of the group's leadership under chair Christophe Castaner.

== Political positions ==
In May 2018, Boudié co-sponsored an initiative in favour of a bioethics law extending to homosexual and single women free access to fertility treatments such as in vitro fertilisation (IVF) under France's national health insurance; it was one of the campaign promises of President Emmanuel Macron and marked the first major social reform of his five-year term.

In July 2019, Boudié voted in favor of the French ratification of the European Union’s Comprehensive Economic and Trade Agreement (CETA) with Canada.
