= Doubs's 5th constituency =

Constituency of the National Assembly of France

5th constituency of Doubs
- inline Constituency of the National Assembly of France

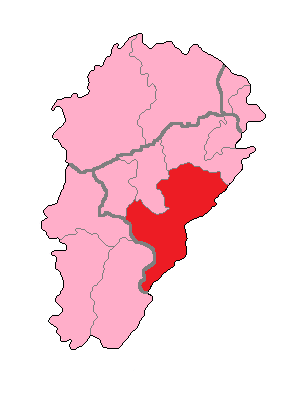
- The constituency shown within Franche-Comté
- Incumbent deputy: Annie Genevard; LR
- Department: Doubs
- Cantons: Amancey, Levier, Montbenoît, Morteau, Mouthe, Pierrefontaine-les-Varans, Pontarlier, Le Russey, Vercel-Villedieu-le-Camp
- Registered voters: 81,964 (2017)

The 5th constituency of Doubs (French: Cinquième circonscription du Doubs) is one of five electoral districts in the department of the same name, each of which returns one deputy to the French National Assembly in elections using the two-round system, with a run-off if no candidate receives more than 50% of the vote in the first round.

== Description ==
The constituency is made up of the nine former cantons of Amancey, Levier, Montbenoît, Morteau, Mouthe, Pierrefontaine-les-Varans, Pontarlier, Le Russey, and Vercel-Villedieu-le-Camp.

Geographically the largest of the department's constituencies, the 5th includes much of the Jura Mountains and boasts long borders with Switzerland to the east and the Jura department to the south-west.

At the time of the 1999 census (which was the basis for the most recent redrawing of constituency boundaries, carried out in 2010) the 5th constituency had a total population of 95,007.

Uniquely in Doubs, the seat has been held continuously by Gaullist parties since 1988.

== Historic representation ==
Election	Member	Party
1986	Proportional representation – no election by constituency	
1988	Roland Vuillaume	RPR
1993	Roland Vuillaume	RPR
1997	Roland Vuillaume	RPR
2002	Jean-Marie Binetruy	UMP
2007	Jean-Marie Binetruy	UMP
2012	Annie Genevard	UMP
2017	Annie Genevard	LR
2022	Annie Genevard	LR
2024	Annie Genevard	LR

== Election results ==
=== 2024 ===
Candidate	Party	Alliance	First round			Second round		
Candidate	Party	Alliance	Votes	%	+/–	Votes	%	+/–
Annie Genevard	LR	UDC	20,356	35.20	-6.87	35,576	62.69	-9.37
Florianne Jeandenand	RN		19,505	33.73	+19.12	21,173	37.31	new
Matthieu Cassez	LFI	NFP	9,709	16.79	-1.93			
Lucas Boillot	REN	Ensemble	7,176	12.41	-7.08			
Sonya Morrison	LO		588	1.02	-0.17			
Nolann Laurent	DIV		497	0.86	new			
Votes			57,831	100.00		56,749	100.00	
Valid votes			57,831	97.53	-0.65	56,749	95.91	+6.24
Blank votes			871	1.47	+0.14	1,712	2.89	-4.60
Null votes			591	1.00	+0.51	708	1.20	-1.63
Turnout			59,293	69.54	+21.25	59,169	69.39	+27.96
Abstentions			25,970	30.46	-21.25	26,104	30.61	-27.96
Registered voters			85,263			85,273		
Result			LR HOLD					

=== 2022 ===
Legislative Election 2022: Doubs's 5th constituency
Party	Candidate	Votes	%	±%
LR (UDC)	Annie Genevard	16,893	42.07	+3.58
HOR (Ensemble)	Philippe Alpy	7,825	19.49	-13.60
LFI (NUPÉS)	Martine Ludi	7,516	18.72	+4.53
RN	Mathilde Jury	5,869	14.61	+4.00
REC	Elena Lebecque	1,118	2.78	N/A
LO	Sonya Morrison	478	1.19	+0.54
LP (RPR)	Alexandra Kadijevic	459	1.14	N/A
Turnout		40,158	48.29	−3.31
2nd round result
LR (UDC)	Annie Genevard	22,681	72.06	+12.28
HOR (Ensemble)	Philippe Alpy	8,796	27.94	−12.28
Turnout		31,477	41.43	−6.58
LR hold				

=== 2017 ===
Candidate	Label	First round		Second round	
Candidate	Label	Votes	%	Votes	%
Annie Genevard	LR	15,968	38.49	21,812	59.78
Sylvie Le Hir	REM	13,728	33.09	14,674	40.22
Jérémy Navion	FN	4,401	10.61		
Martine Ludi	FI	3,632	8.75		
Anthony Poulin	ECO	1,632	3.93		
Jean-Marie Pietoukhoff	ECO	628	1.51		
Évelyne Ternant	PCF	580	1.40		
Yannick Ardiet	DIV	350	0.84		
Emmanuel Chabeuf	DIV	298	0.72		
Myriam Springaux	EXG	269	0.65		
Votes		41,486	100.00	36,486	100.00
Valid votes		41,486	98.08	36,486	92.72
Blank votes		557	1.32	1,953	4.96
Null votes		253	0.60	913	2.32
Turnout		42,296	51.60	39,352	48.01
Abstentions		39,674	48.40	42,612	51.99
Registered voters		81,970		81,964	
Source: Ministry of the Interior

=== 2012 ===
2012 legislative election in Doubs's 5th constituency
Candidate	Party	First round		Second round	
Candidate	Party	Votes	%	Votes	%
Annie Genevard	UMP	19,103	40.19%	26,651	62.54%
Liliane Lucchesi	PS	11,009	23.16%	15,965	37.46%
Nathalie Bertin	PR	6,327	13.31%		
Claude Vernier	FN	5,679	11.95%		
François Mandil	EELV	1,836	3.86%		
Claude Faivre	FG–NPA–LA	1,556	3.27%		
Christian Petit	MoDem	575	1.21%		
Renée Remy	MRC	352	0.74%		
Jean-Marie Pietoukhoff	??	329	0.69%		
Chantal Charles	DLR	275	0.58%		
Odile Humbert	LO	249	0.52%		
Gaëlle Wendlinger	AEI	238	0.50%		
Valid votes		47,528	98.47%	42,616	96.85%
Spoilt and null votes		739	1.53%	1,388	3.15%
Votes cast / turnout		48,267	62.41%	44,004	56.91%
Abstentions		29,075	37.59%	33,314	43.09%
Registered voters		77,342	100.00%	77,318	100.00%

=== 2007 ===
Legislative Election 2007: Doubs's 5th constituency
Party	Candidate	Votes	%	±%
UMP	Jean-Marie Binetruy	25,408	54.93	
DVG	Christian Bouday	8,743	18.90	
MoDem	Marie-Jacques Chalumeau	3,981	8.61	
FN	Claude Vernier	2,363	5.11	
LV	François Mandil	1,599	3.46	
EXG	Laurence Lyonnais	1,409	3.05	
Others	N/A	2,751	-	−
Turnout		47,136	63.19	
UMP hold				

=== 2002 ===
Legislative Election 2002: Doubs's 5th constituency
Party	Candidate	Votes	%	±%
UMP	Jean-Marie Binetruy	21,438	47.39	
LV	Robert Huget	7,069	15.63	
FN	Martine Faivre-Pierret	5,372	11.88	
UDF	Gérard Faivre	3,783	8.36	
PR	Claude Bazile	1,466	3.24	
PCF	Alain Vuillaume	1,407	3.11	
LO	Claude Cuenot	921	2.04	
Others	N/A	3,781	-	−
Turnout		46,834	66.40	
2nd round result
UMP	Jean-Marie Binetruy	27,022	69.75	
LV	Robert Huget	11,719	30.25	
Turnout		41,013	58.15	
UMP hold				

=== 1997 ===
Legislative Election 1997: Doubs's 5th constituency
Party	Candidate	Votes	%	±%
RPR	Roland Vuillaume	17,269	39.24	
PS	Christian Bouday	11,299	25.68	
FN	Jean-Luc Bart	6,256	14.22	
LDI	Anne-Aymore D'Alès	2,625	5.97	
PCF	Alain Vuillaume	1,818	4.13	
LV	Pascal Hintzy	1,448	3.29	
LO	Jean-Pierre Poissenot	1,075	2.44	
Others	N/A	2,214	-	−
Turnout		47,651	71.74	
2nd round result
RPR	Roland Vuillaume	26,325	57.28	
PS	Christian Bouday	19,634	42.72	
Turnout		49,343	74.31	
RPR hold				

== Sources ==
Official results of French elections from 2002: "Résultats électoraux officiels en France" (in French).
