= Jean-Paul Garraud =

French politician (born 1956)

Jean-Paul Garraud MEP
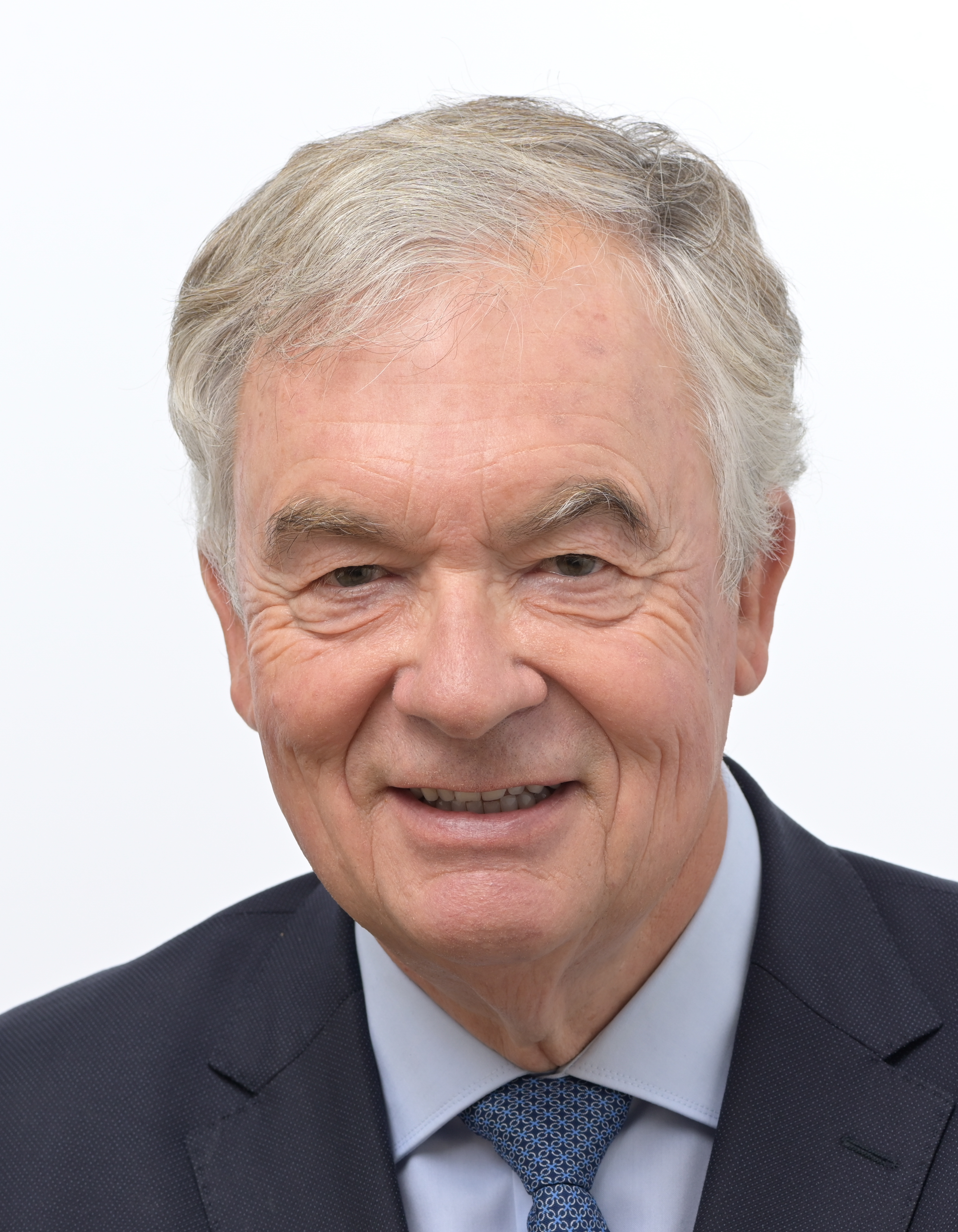

Member of the European Parliament
- Incumbent
- Assumed office 2 July 2019
- Constituency: France

Member of the Regional Council of Occitania
- Incumbent
- Assumed office 2 July 2021
- President: Carole Delga

Member of the National Assembly for Gironde's 10th constituency
- In office 19 June 2002 – 19 June 2012
- Preceded by: Gilbert Mitterrand
- Succeeded by: Florent Boudié

Personal details
- Born: 27 February 1956 (age 70) Toulouse, France
- Party: National Rally (since 2021); The Republicans (2015-19)
- Education: French National School for the Judiciary
- Profession: Magistrate

Jean-Paul Garraud (born 27 February 1956) is a French politician serving as a Member of the European Parliament (MEP) since 2019. A cofounder of The Popular Right, he is former member of the National Assembly, where he represented the 10th constituency of Gironde from 2002 to 2012.

A magistrate by occupation, he was a member of the Union for a Popular Movement (UMP) from 2002, later The Republicans (LR). Since 2019, he has been an Independent. In the 2019 European Parliament election, he was elected on the National Rally (RN) list along with other Independents, most notably Thierry Mariani. In 2021, Marine Le Pen announced she would appoint Garraud as Minister of Justice were she to win the 2022 presidential election. He was re-elected to the European Parliament in 2024.

Garraud will lead the RN list in the 2021 regional election in Occitania; he received support from two influential politicians in the region for the list's leadership: Perpignan Mayor Louis Aliot and Béziers Mayor Robert Ménard.
