= Le Trombinoscope =

Le Trombinoscope is a French language directory service publication for the French political world. It is published in two volumes. Trombinoscope was created in 1981 by Félix Colin, who was then a parliamentary journalist, and is published by Huveaux Politique a subsidiary company of Dods (Group) PLC.

Published each year, it contains the biographies of 7,500 personalities and has a print run of 12,500 copies. Trombinoscope also awards many annual prizes: political personality of the year, minister of the year, political revelation of the year, deputy of the year, senator of the year, local elected official of the year and European of the year.

Dods PLC also publishes "La Lettre du Trombinoscope", a monthly newsletter, with a print run of 3,500 copies. There is also a Trombinoscope for the European Union, published since 2000, with 3,400 biographies, and Health Trombinoscope, published since 2006, which contains 600 biographies.
