= Lot (department) =

Department of France in Occitanie

Lot Òlt (Occitan)
- Department of France
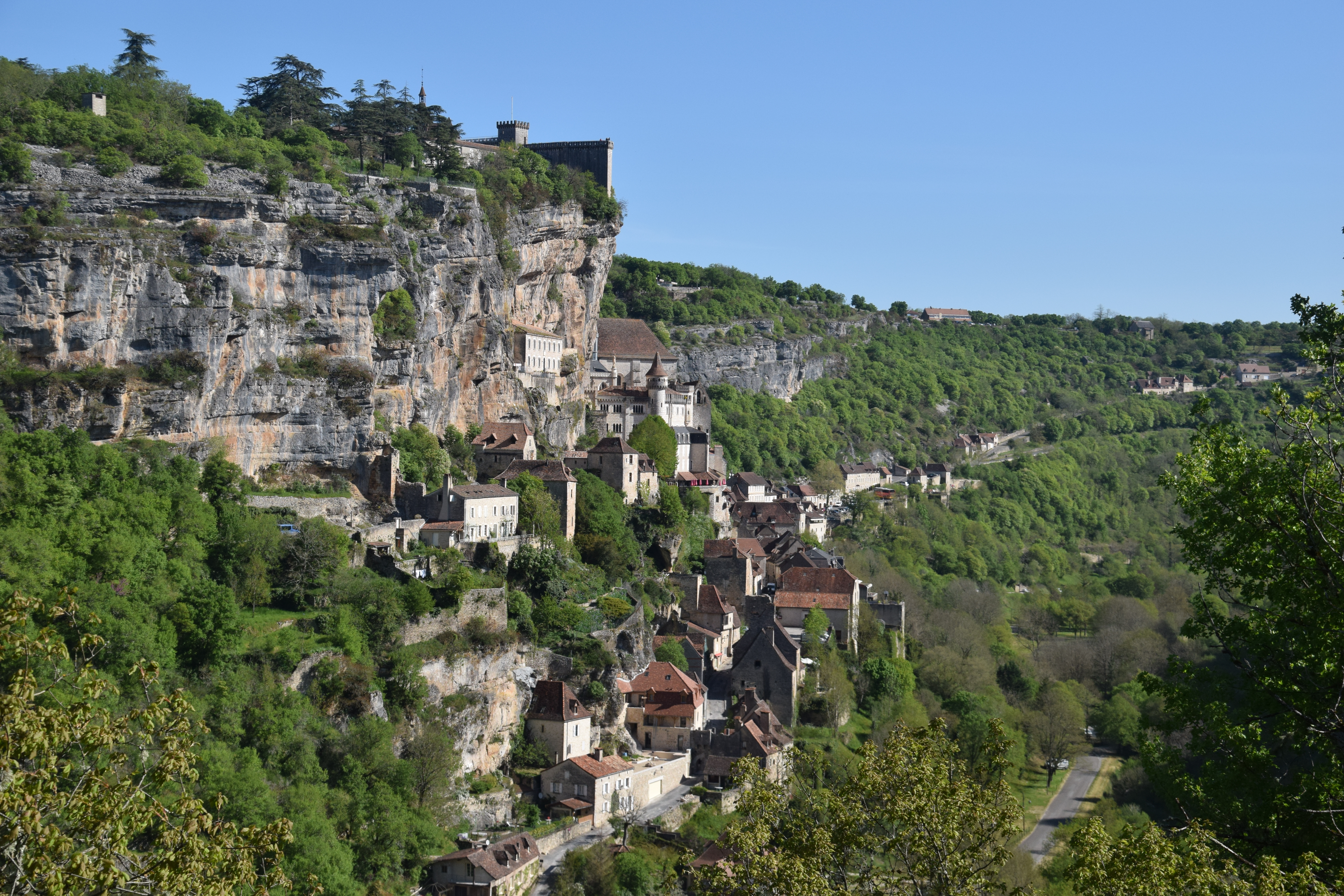
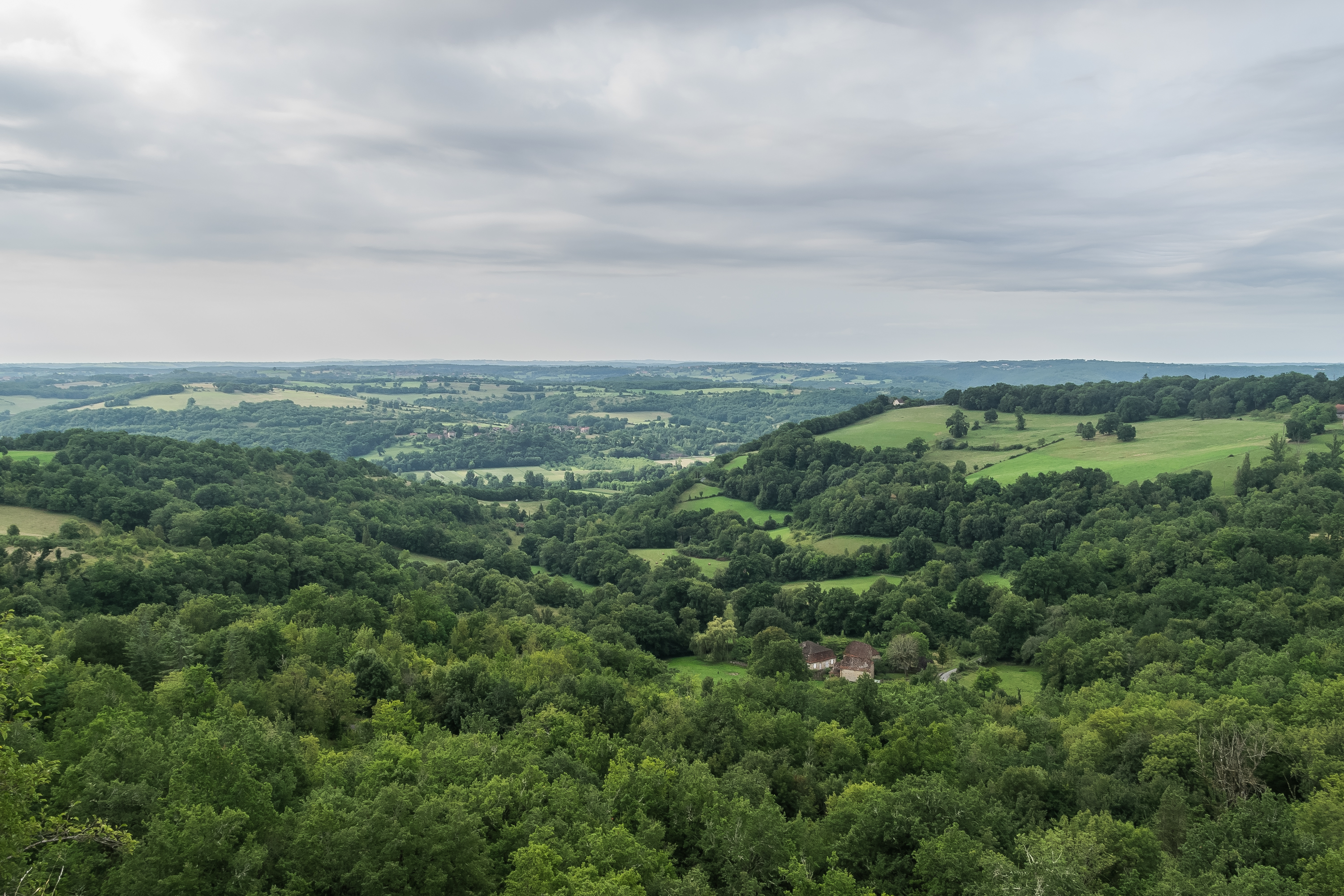
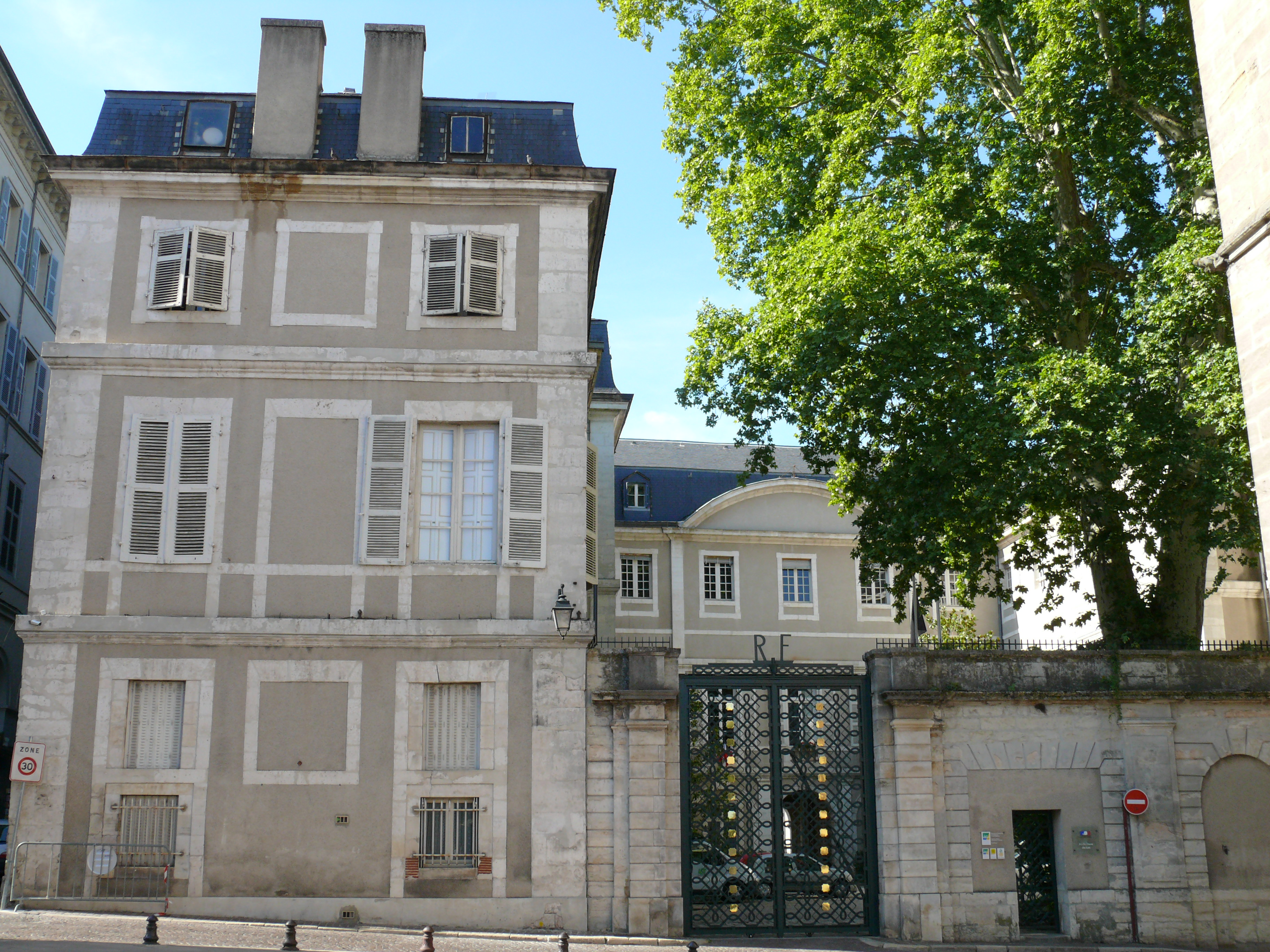
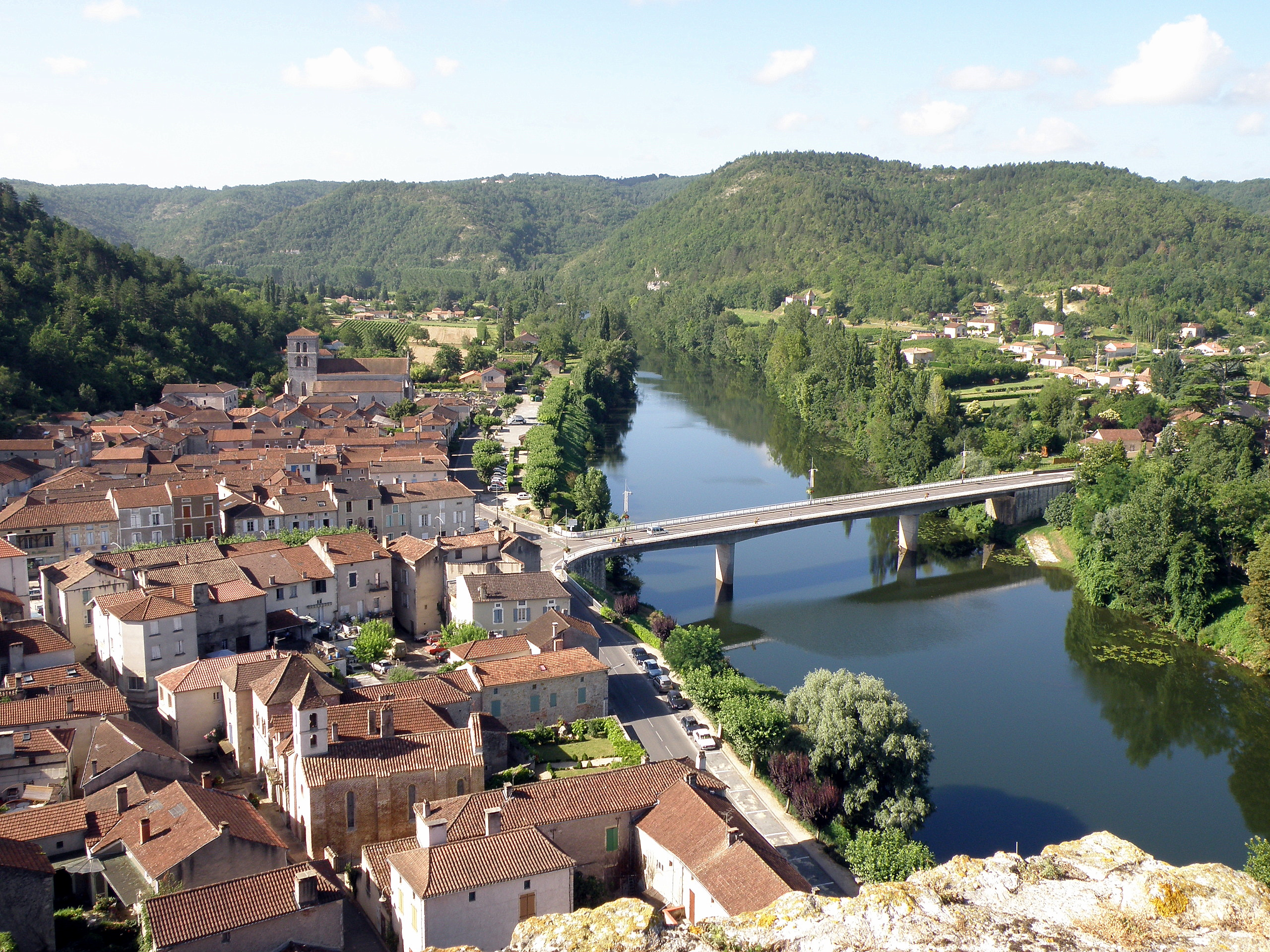
- From top down, left to right: Figeac, Rocamadour, Faycelles, Lot River, prefecture building in Cahors and Luzech

- Coat of arms

- Location of Lot in France
- Coordinates: 44°35′N 01°35′E
- Country: France
- Region: Occitanie
- Prefecture: Cahors
- Subprefectures: Figeac; Gourdon

Government
  - President of the Departmental Council: Serge Rigal

Area^{1}
  - Total: 5,217 km^{2} (2,014 sq mi)

Population (2023)
  - Total: 176,473
  - Rank: 93rd
  - Density: 33.83/km^{2} (87.61/sq mi)
- Time zone: UTC+1 (CET)
  - Summer (DST): UTC+2 (CEST)
- Department number: 46
- Arrondissements: 3
- Cantons: 17
- Communes: 312
- ^1 French Land Register data, which exclude estuaries, and lakes, ponds, and glaciers larger than 1 km^{2}

Lot (French pronunciation: [lɔt]; Occitan: Òlt [ɔl]) is a department in the Occitanie region of France. Named after the river Lot, it lies in the southwestern part of the country and had a population of 176,473 in 2023. Its prefecture is Cahors; its subprefectures are Figeac and Gourdon.

== History ==
Lot is one of the original 83 departments created during the French Revolution on 4 March 1790. It was created from part of the province of Quercy. In 1808 some of the original southeastern cantons were separated from it to form the department of Tarn-et-Garonne. It originally extended much farther to the south and included the city of Montauban.

== Geography ==
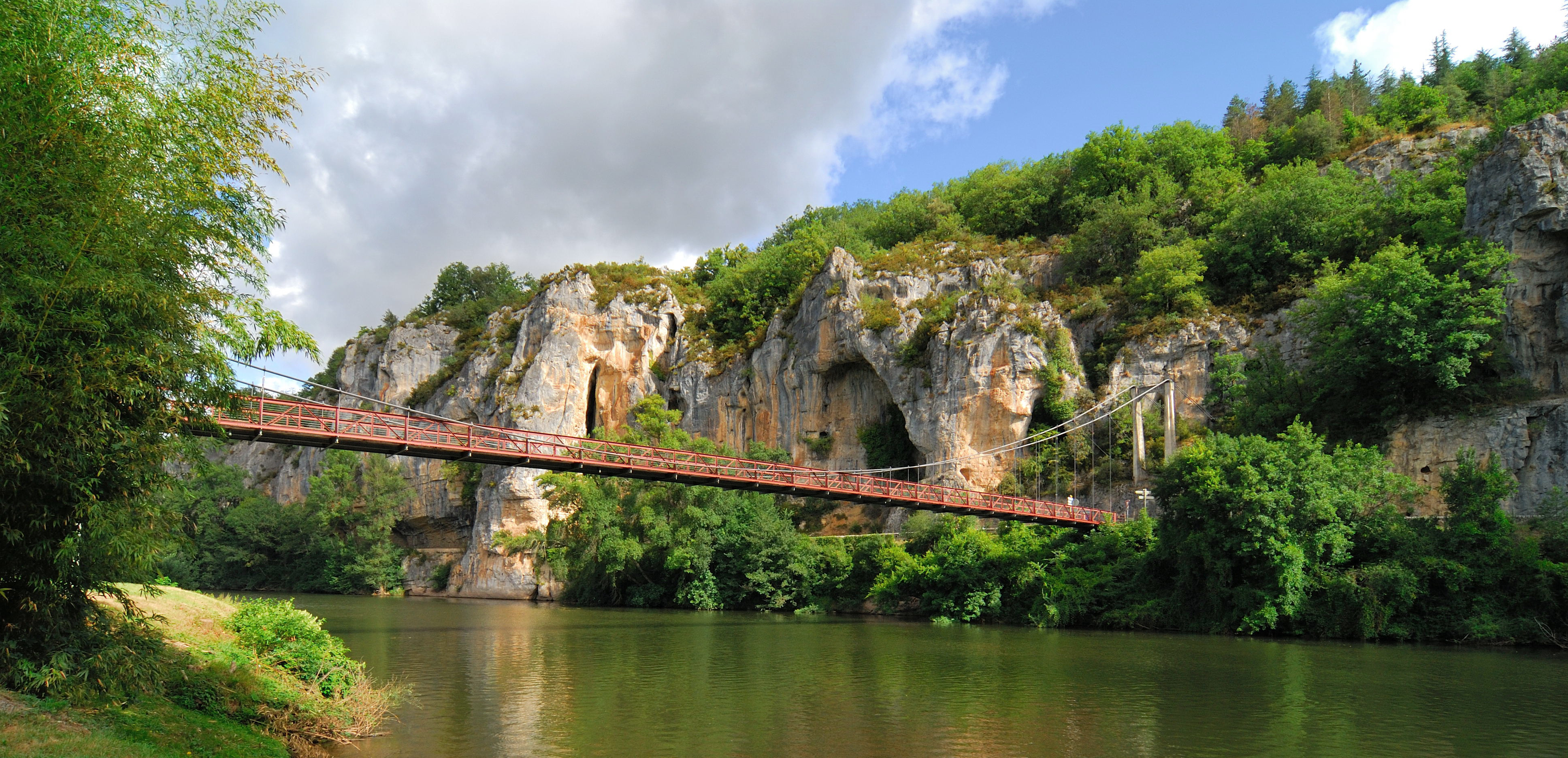
Lot River, after which the department is named

Lot is part of the region of Occitanie and is surrounded by the departments of Corrèze, Cantal, Aveyron, Tarn-et-Garonne, Lot-et-Garonne and Dordogne. It is named after the river Lot, which in its Occitan name is Olt.

Cahors is the prefecture of the department, lying in its southwestern part: a medieval cathedral town known internationally for its production of Cahors wine, it lies in a wide loop of the Lot River and is famous for its 14th-century bridge, the Pont Valentré. Figeac is a medieval town where Jean-François Champollion, the first translator of Egyptian hieroglyphics, was born, situated in the eastern part of Lot. Gourdon, a medieval hilltop town located in Lot's northwestern part, with a well preserved centre, comprises many prehistoric painted caves nearby, notably the Grottes de Cougnac.

=== Principal towns ===
The most populous commune is Cahors, the prefecture. As of 2023, there are seven communes with more than 3,000 inhabitants:

Commune	Population (2023)
Cahors	20,050
Figeac	9,793
Gourdon	4,206
Pradines	3,617
Gramat	3,512
Saint-Céré	3,429
Souillac	3,192

== Demographics ==
The inhabitants of Lot are called Lotois and Lotoises in French. Population development since 1801:

Historical population

Year	Pop.	±% p.a.
1801	261,207	—
1806	268,149	+0.53%
1821	275,296	+0.18%
1831	284,505	+0.33%
1841	287,739	+0.11%
1851	296,224	+0.29%
1861	295,542	−0.02%
1872	281,404	−0.44%
1881	280,269	−0.04%
1891	253,939	−0.98%
1901	226,720	−1.13%
1911	205,769	−0.96%
1921	176,889	−1.50%
1931	166,637	−0.60%

Year	Pop.	±% p.a.
1936	162,572	−0.49%
1946	154,897	−0.48%
1954	147,754	−0.59%
1962	149,929	+0.18%
1968	151,198	+0.14%
1975	150,778	−0.04%
1982	154,533	+0.35%
1990	155,816	+0.10%
1999	160,197	+0.31%
2007	171,173	+0.83%
2012	174,346	+0.37%
2017	173,828	−0.06%
2023	176,473	+0.25%

== Politics ==
=== Departmental Council of Lot ===
The Departmental Council of Lot has 34 seats. Since the 2015 departmental elections, 30 are controlled by the Socialist Party (PS) and its allies; four are controlled by the miscellaneous right. Since 2014, the President of the Departmental Council has been Serge Rigal, currently a member of La République En Marche! (REM).

=== Members of the National Assembly ===
Lot elected the following members of the National Assembly during the 2024 legislative election:

Constituency	Member	Party
Lot's 1st constituency	Aurélien Pradié	Miscellaneous right
Lot's 2nd constituency	Christophe Proença	PS

=== Senators ===
Lot is represented in the Senate by Angèle Préville (since 2017) and Jean-Claude Requier (since 2011).

== Tourism ==
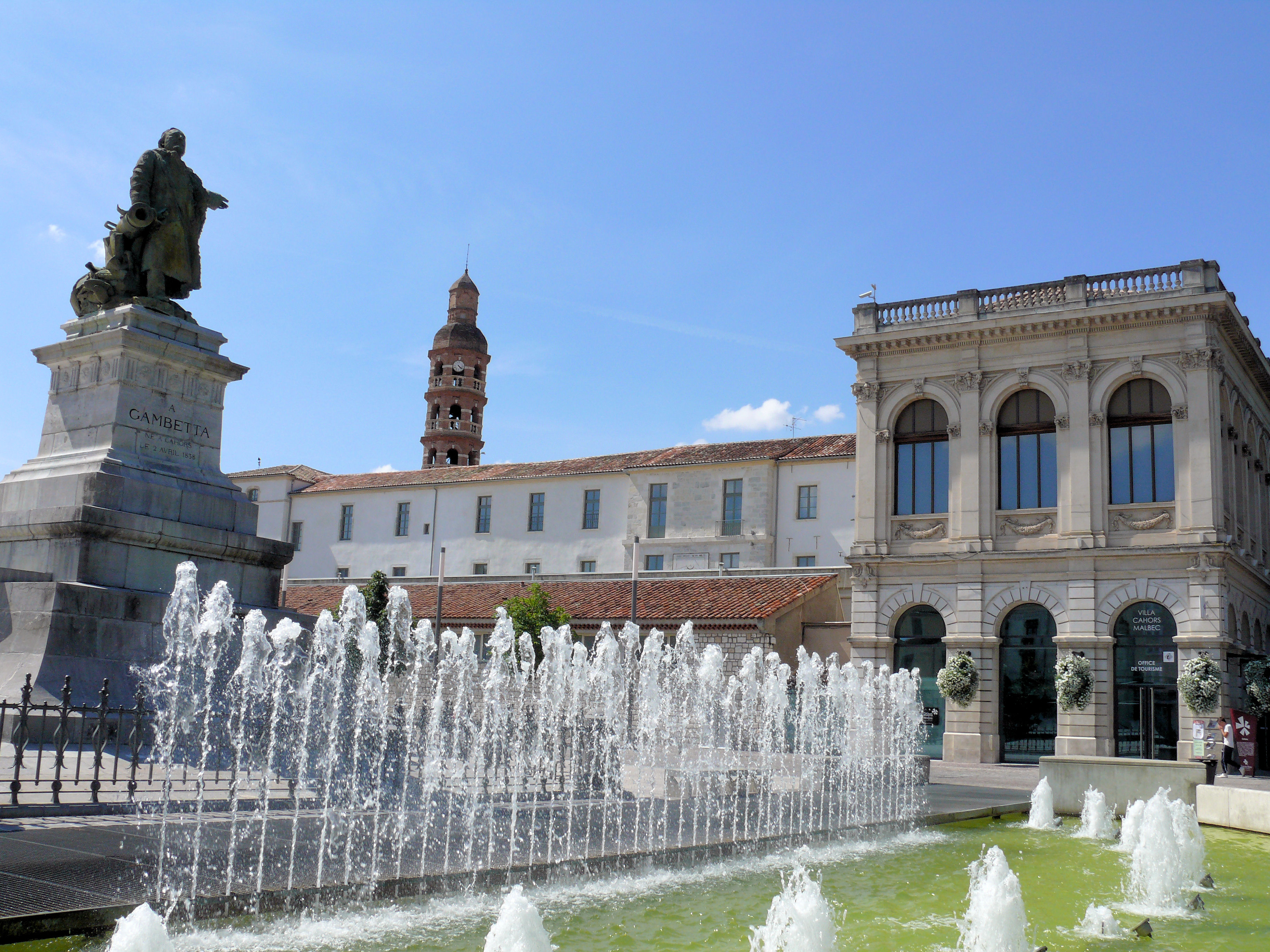
Cahors

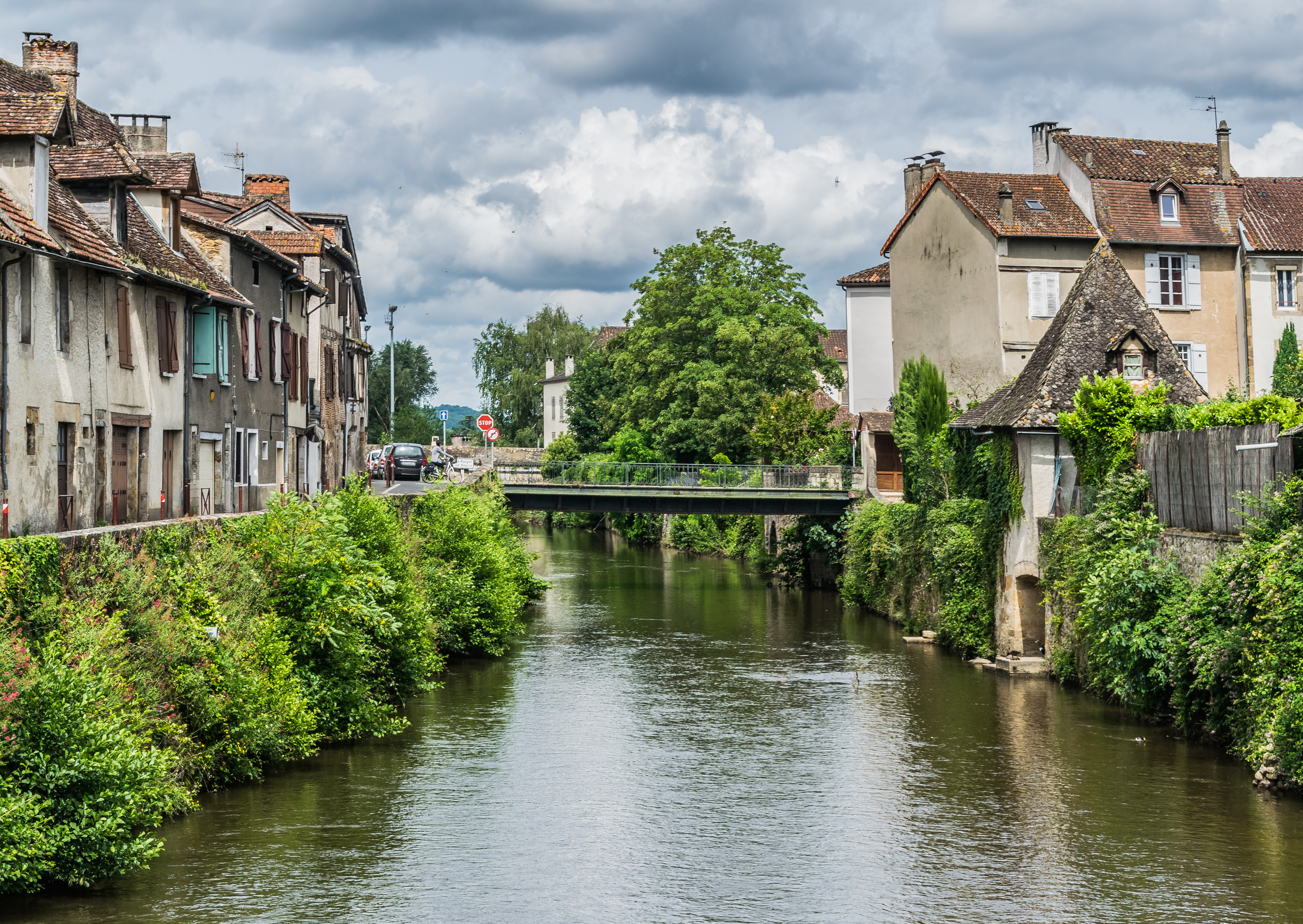
Saint-Céré

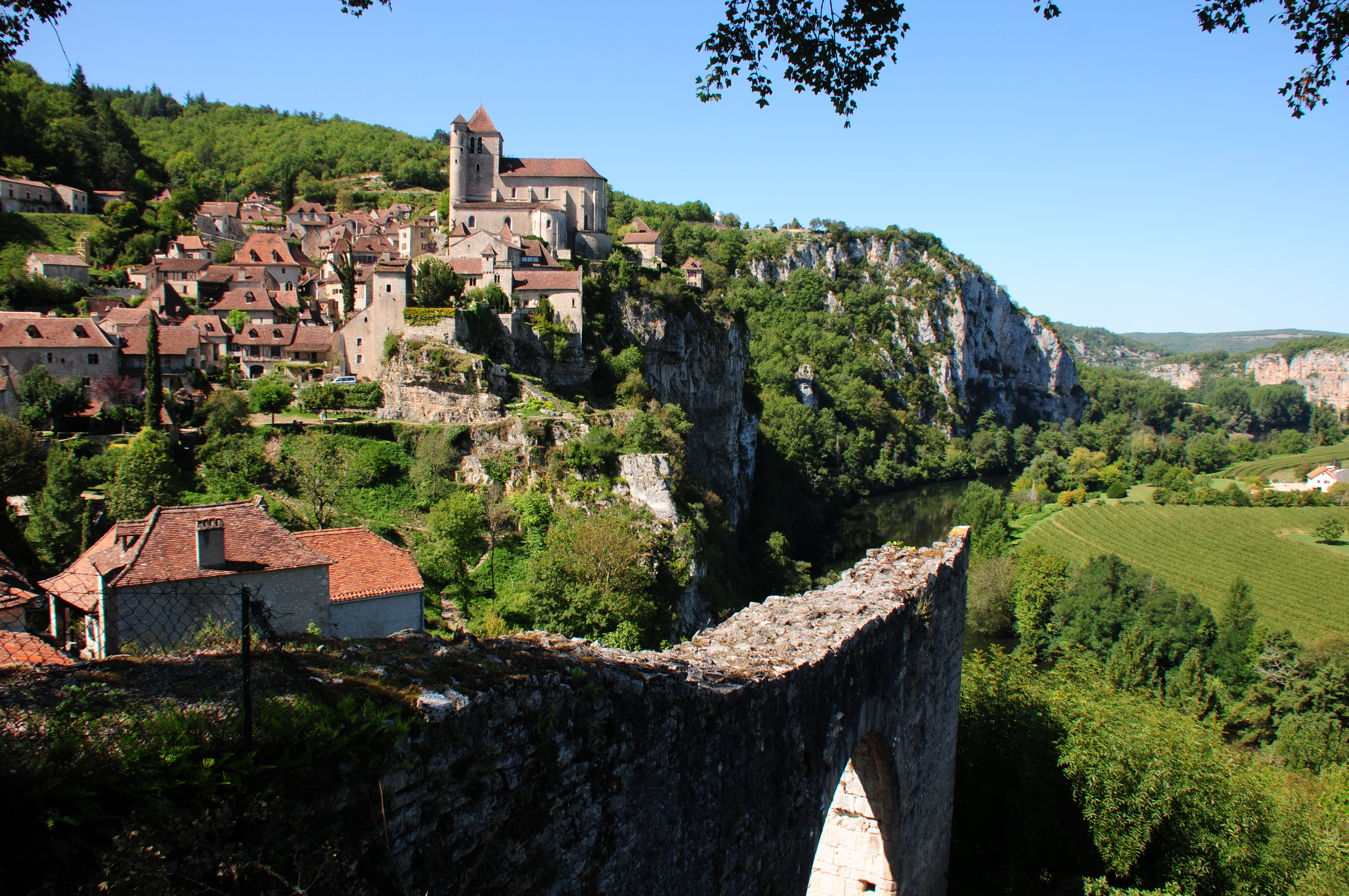
Saint-Cirq-Lapopie

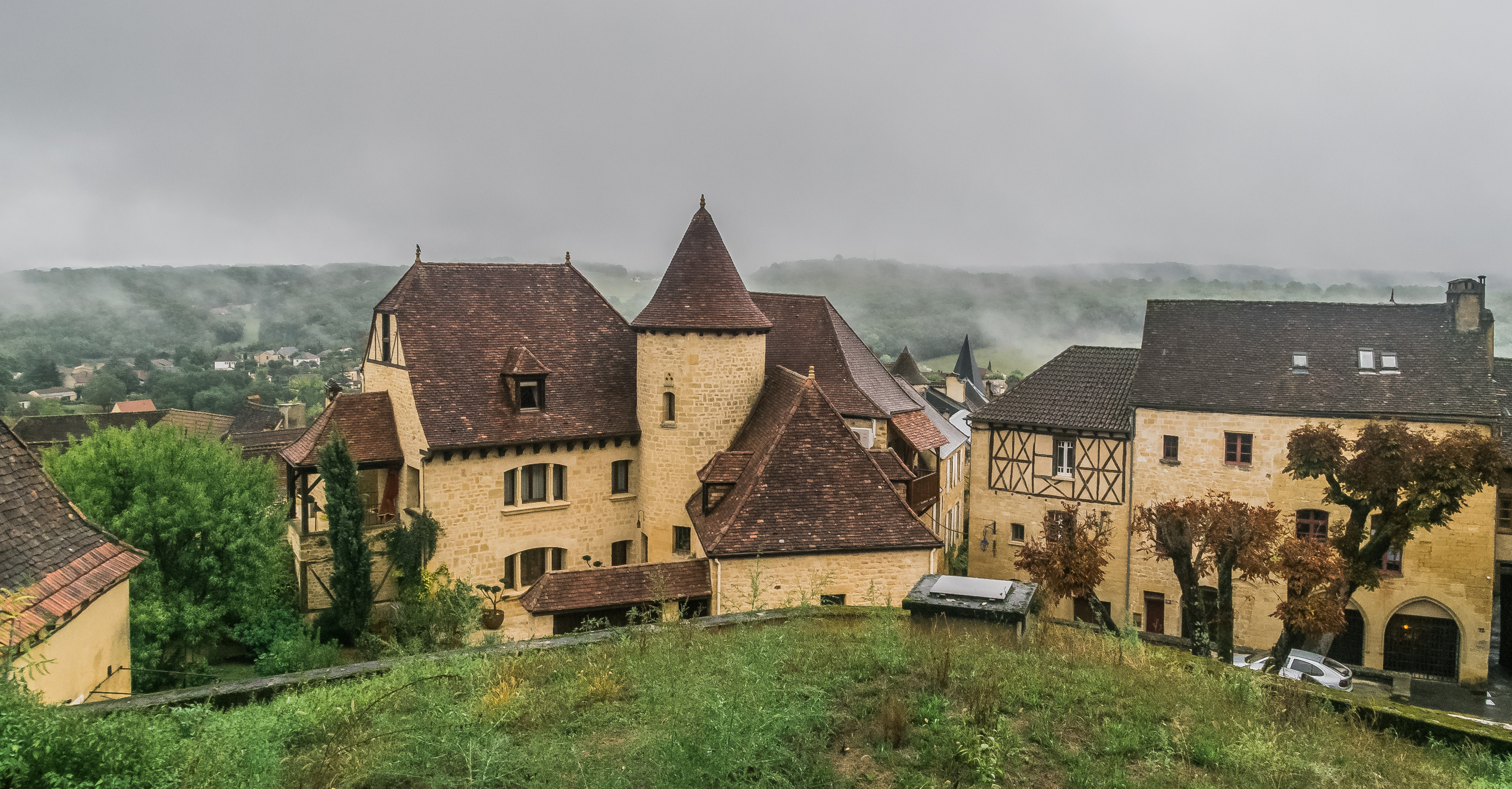
Gourdon

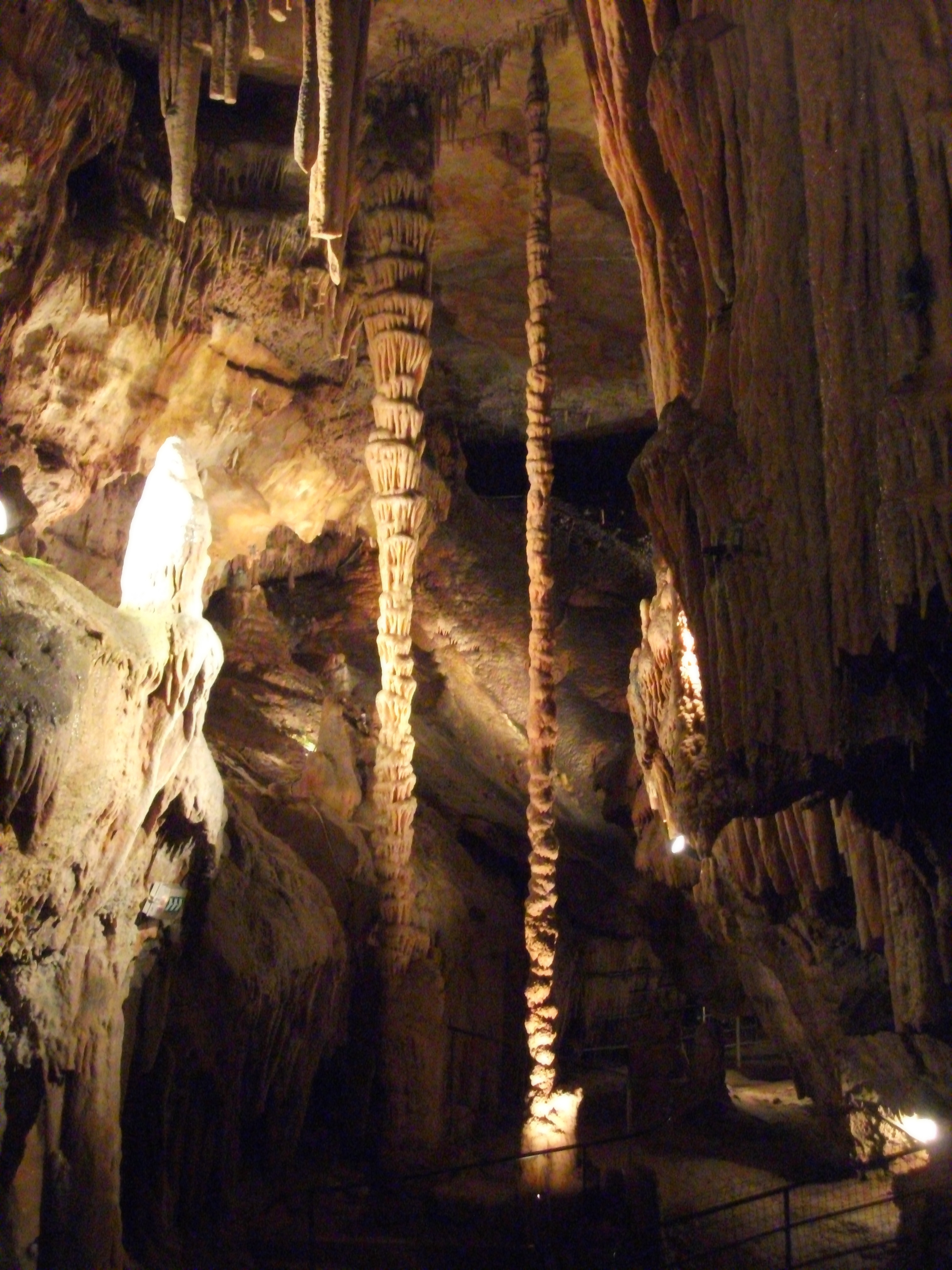
Grottes de Presque

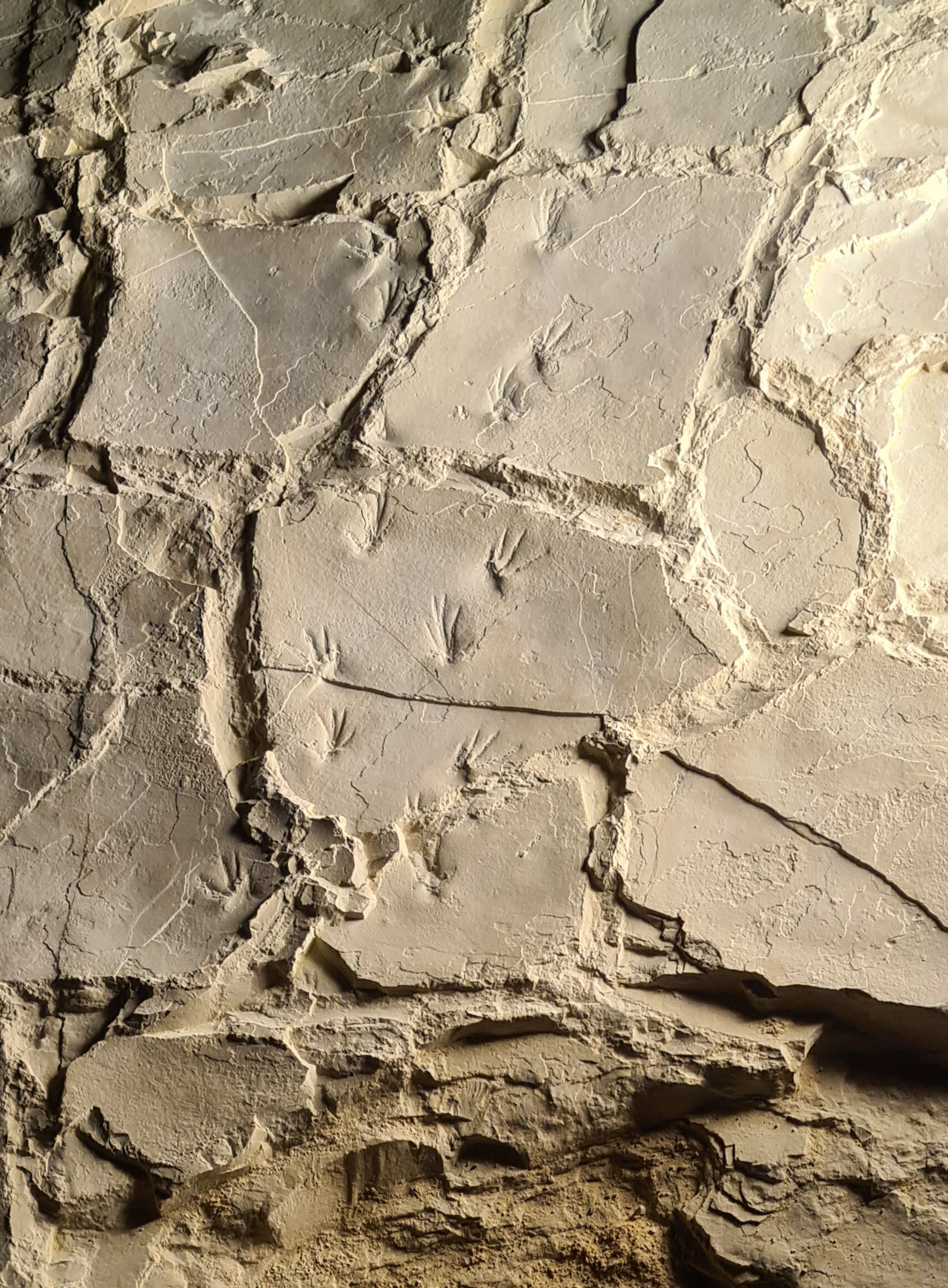
Fossil pterosaur footprints, Pterosaur Beach.

== See also ==
- Cantons of the Lot department
- Communes of the Lot department
