= Departmental Council of Lot =

Departmental legislature in France

Departmental Council of Lot Conseil départemental du Lot
- Logo of the Council

Leadership
- President: Serge Rigal, DVG since 2 April 2015

Structure
- Seats: 34
- Political groups: Government (34): PS (16); DVG (10); DVD (2); PR (2); LR (2); LÉ (1); PRG (1); www.lot.fr

The Departmental Council of Lot (French: Conseil départemental du Lot, Occitan: Conselh departamental de Òut) is the deliberative assembly of the Lot department in the region of Occitanie. It consists of 34 members (general councilors) from 17 cantons and its headquarters are in Cahors, capital of the department.

The President of the General Council is Serge Rigal.

== Vice-Presidents ==
The President of the Departmental Council is assisted by 10 vice-presidents chosen from among the departmental advisers. Each of them has a delegation of authority.

List of vice-presidents of the Lot Departmental Council (as of 2021)
Order	Name	Party	Canton	Delegation
1st	Nelly Ginestet	UG	Cahors-3	Social action, child protection and fight against exclusion
2nd	Christophe Proenca	PS	Cère et Ségala	Attractiveness, tourism and sport
3rd	Catherine Marlas	UCG	Marches du Sud-Quercy	Ecological and energy transition and housing
4th	André Mellinger	PS	Figeac-1	Infrastructure and technology
5th	Maryse Maury	UG	Luzech	Elderly and the disabled
6th	Guillaume Baldy	UG	Figeac-2	Finance and budget rapporteur
7th	Catherine Prunet	DVG	Lacapelle-Marival	Culture, education and youth
8th	Remi Branco	PS	Puy-l'Evêque	Agriculture and solidarity-based land use planning
9th	Caroline Mey-Fau	PS	Gramat	Historical heritage, preventive archaeology and departmental archives
10th	Frédéric Gineste	DVG	Gourdon	Transport

== See also ==
- Lot
- General councils of France
- Departmental Council of Lot (official website)
