= Lot's 1st constituency =

Constituency of the National Assembly of France

1st constituency of Lot
- inline Constituency of the National Assembly of France

- The constituencies of Lot

- Lot in France
- Deputy: Aurélien Pradié; LR
- Department: Lot
- Cantons: Cahors-Nord-Est, Cahors-Nord-Ouest, Cahors-Sud, Castelnau-Montratier, Catus, Cazals, Gourdon, Labastide-Murat, Lalbenque, Lauzès, Luzech, Montcuq, Payrac, Puy-l'Évêque, Saint-Germain-du-Bel-Air, Saint-Géry, Salviac
- Registered voters: 94,182

The 1st constituency of Lot is a French legislative constituency in the Lot département.

== Deputies ==
Election	Member	Party
1988	Bernard Charles	MRG
1993	Bernard Charles	MRG
1997	Bernard Charles	PRG
2002	Michel Roumegoux	UDF
2007	Dominique Orliac	PRG
2012	Dominique Orliac	PRG
2017	Aurélien Pradié	LR
2022	Aurélien Pradié	LR
2024	Aurélien Pradié	LR

== Election results ==
=== 2024 ===
Candidate	Party	Alliance	First round			Second round		
Candidate	Party	Alliance	Votes	%	+/–	Votes	%	+/–
Aurélien Pradié	LR	DVD	22,180	42.25	–3.21	28,049	53.78	–10.85
Elsa Bougeard	LFI	NPF	12,775	24.33	+2.06	12,129	23.26	–12.11
Slavka Mihaylova	RN		12,108	23.06	+14.03	11,976	22.96	N/A
Frédéric Decremps	REN	Ensemble	4,689	8.93	N/A			
François Tesson	R!		398	0.76	–1.84			
Ghislain Domenech	LO		353	0.67	+0.23			
Valid votes			52,503	97.81		52,153	97.90	
Blank votes			598	1.11		698	1.31	
Null votes			575	1.07		423	0.79	
Turnout			53,676	73.48		53,274	72.93	
Abstentions			19,371	26.52		19,777	27.07	
Registered voters			73,047			73,051		
						LR HOLD		

=== 2022 ===
Legislative Election 2022: Lot's 1st constituency
Party	Candidate	Votes	%	±%
LR (UDC)	Aurélien Pradié	19,352	45.46	+20.82
LFI (NUPÉS)	Elsa Bougeard	9,474	22.26	-1.07
PS	Rémi Branco*	7,118	16.72	N/A
RN	Cendrine Couturier	3,844	9.03	+0.02
REC	Monique Goussu	1,105	2.60	N/A
Others	N/A	1,675		
Turnout		42,568	59.43	+1.36
2nd round result
LR (UDC)	Aurélien Pradié	25,616	64.63	+13.31
LFI (NUPÉS)	Elsa Bougeard	14,016	35.37	N/A
Turnout		42,568	59.43	+7.42
LR hold				

* PS dissident

=== 2017 ===
Candidate	Label	First round		Second round	
Candidate	Label	Votes	%	Votes	%
Sébastien Maurel	REM	11,552	28.67	15,516	48.68
Aurélien Pradié	LR	9,929	24.64	16,358	51.32
Isabelle Eymes	FI	5,813	14.43		
Dominique Orliac	PRG	4,930	12.24		
Emmanuel Crenne	FN	3,629	9.01		
Mathieu Ebbesen-Goudin	ECO	2,563	6.36		
Fanny Beggiato	PCF	1,022	2.54		
Isabelle Duprat	DLF	447	1.11		
Ghislain Domenech	EXG	211	0.52		
William Rineau	DIV	198	0.49		
Votes		40,294	100.00	31,874	100.00
Valid votes		40,294	97.99	31,874	86.55
Blank votes		550	1.34	3,422	9.29
Null votes		276	0.67	1,530	4.15
Turnout		41,120	58.07	36,826	52.01
Abstentions		29,686	41.93	33,979	47.99
Registered voters		70,806		70,805	
Source: Ministry of the Interior

=== 2012 ===
Legislative Election 2012: Lot's 1st constituency
Party	Candidate	Votes	%	±%
PRG	Dominique Orliac	18,560	41.54	
UMP	Aurélien Pradié	11,321	25.34	
FG	Serge Laybros	4,328	9.69	
AC	Michel Roumegoux	2,908	6.51	
FN	Elizabeth Lapierre	2,867	6.42	
EELV	Francesco Testa	1,982	4.44	
Others	N/A	2,714		
Turnout		44,680	63.66	
2nd round result
PRG	Dominique Orliac	25,847	59.85	
UMP	Aurélien Pradié	17,342	40.15	
Turnout		43,189	61.53	
PRG hold				

== Sources ==
- "Résultats électoraux officiels en France" (in French). 2012.
- "Résultats électoraux officiels en France" (in French). 2017.
