= Derambakhsh =

Derambakhsh is a surname. Notable people with the surname include:

- Kambiz Derambakhsh (1942–2021), Iranian designer, illustrator and graphic artist
- Kioumars Derambakhsh (1945–2020), Iranian filmmaker, producer, writer and photographer
