= Jacques Kossowski =

French politician

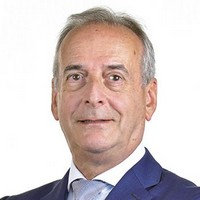

Mayor of Courbevoie
- Incumbent
- Assumed office 25 June 1995
- Preceded by: Charles Deprez

Member of the National Assembly for Hauts-de-Seine's 3rd constituency
- In office 12 June 1997 – 20 June 2017
- Preceded by: Jean-Yves Haby
- Succeeded by: Christine Hennion

Personal details
- Born: 11 October 1940 (age 85) Paris, France
- Party: The Republicans

Jacques Kossowski (born October 11, 1940 in Paris) is a former member of the National Assembly of France. He represented the 3rd constituency of the Hauts-de-Seine department, and is a member of the Union for a Popular Movement. He is also the Mayor of Courbevoie, Hauts-de-Seine since 1995.

== Biography ==
He was a company director before entering politics. In the 1983 municipal elections, he joined the Courbevoie municipal council on Union for French Democracy list. In 1993, he became deputy mayor in charge of urban planning. During the 1995 municipal elections, the two men swapped roles: Jacques Kossowski headed the outgoing majority's list and was elected mayor, while Charles Deprez took over responsibility for urban planning.

He was then elected representative of the 3rd district of Hauts-de-Seine in 1997 as a dissident right-wing candidate against the incumbent representative Jean-Yves Haby, who was backed by the UDF and the RPR.

At the local level, Jacques Kossowski and Charlez Duprez clashed over Courbevoie's urban planning policy. Tensions between the two elected officials reached a peak in January 2001 when Charlez Duprez and his son Michel were stripped of their deputy positions after voting against a municipal majority decision a month earlier. The former mayor then threw his support behind Franck-Eric Morel's dissident candidacy in the 2001 French municipal elections. Jacques Kossowski faced a runoff election against Morel but retained his seat as mayor after the second round of voting.

He ran for re-election and retained his seat as deputy until 2017, when, in accordance with the law on the non-accumulation of mandates, he chose to focus on his role as mayor and leave his seat to Jean Spiri, who was ultimately defeated by Macronist candidate Christine Hennion.

He supported Nicolas Sarkozy in the 2016 Republican presidential primary. At the beginning of that same year, he became president of the Paris Ouest la Défense public territorial institution.

Re-elected mayor in 2008 and 2014 in the first round, he faced his former deputy Aurélie Taquillain, who had joined Renaissance (French political party), in the 2020 municipal elections and was forced into a runoff in the first round. However, he was re-elected despite a shift in votes that seemed unfavorable to him due to the absence of a left-wing list in the second round.
