= Castroville =

Castroville may refer to:

- Castroville, California, United States
- Castroville, Texas, United States
