= Hauts-de-Seine's 3rd constituency =

Constituency of the National Assembly of France

3rd constituency of Hauts-de-Seine
- inline Constituency of the National Assembly of France

- Deputy: Philippe Juvin; LR
- Department: Hauts-de-Seine
- Cantons: Bois-Colombes, Courbevoie Nord, Courbevoie Sud, La Garenne-Colombes
- Registered voters: 76,553

The 3rd constituency of the Hauts-de-Seine is a French legislative constituency in the Hauts-de-Seine département. It is represented in the XVIth legislature by Philippe Juvin of LR.

== Description ==
Hauts-de-Seine's 3rd constituency lies in the north of the department around Courbevoie situated 8.2 km to the west of central Paris. The seat is urban in character and is densely packed on the western side of the Seine on the opposite bank to Neuilly-sur-Seine. The constituency also includes part of La Défense the business district which serves the capital.

The seat has elected conservative deputies without interruption since 1988, however between 1973 and 1986 and seat elected a deputy from the French Communist Party. In recent years the seat has become very safe for the Gaullist right with the UMP candidate winning in the first round in 2002 and 2007.

== Historic Representative ==
Election	Member	Party
1967	Émile Tricon	UDR
1968	Émile Tricon	UDR
1973	Dominique Frelaut	PCF
1978	Dominique Frelaut	PCF
1981	Dominique Frelaut	PCF
1986	Proportional representation – no election by constituency	
1988	Jean-Yves Haby	UDF
1993	Jean-Yves Haby	UDF
1997	Jacques Kossowski	RPR
2002	Jacques Kossowski	UMP
2007	Jacques Kossowski	UMP
2012	Jacques Kossowski	UMP
2017	Christine Hennion	LREM
2022	Philippe Juvin	LR

== Election results ==
=== 2024 ===
Candidate	Party	Alliance	First round			Second round		
Candidate	Party	Alliance	Votes	%	+/–	Votes	%	+/–
Philippe Juvin	LR		31,109	52.09	+20.95			
Isabelle Dahan	PS	NFP	18,774	31.44	+8.34			
Carole Roussel	RN		8,478	14.20	+8.96			
Marc Gerard	REC		992	1.66	-3.41			
Aline Fradin	LO		992	1.66	+1.19			
Valid votes			59,717	98.35	+0.14			
Blank votes			897	1.48	-0.17			
Null votes			107	0.18	+0.03			
Turnout			60,721	73.07	+17.89			
Abstentions			22,374	26.93	-17.89			
Registered voters			83,095					
Source: Ministry of the Interior, Le Monde
Result						LR HOLD		

=== 2022 ===
Legislative Election 2022: Hauts-de-Seine's 3rd constituency
Party	Candidate	Votes	%	±%
LREM (Ensemble)	Aurélie Taquillain	14,515	32.40	-14.19
LR (UDC)	Philippe Juvin	13,949	31.14	+5.49
LFI (NUPÉS)	Sara Tij	10,348	23.10	+7.99
RN	Agnès Laffite	2,348	5.24	+1.28
REC	Anabelle Guedj	2,269	5.07	N/A
Others	N/A	1,365		
Turnout		45,613	55.18	+0.77
2nd round result
LR (UDC)	Philippe Juvin	17,083	38.00	-3.34
LREM (Ensemble)	Aurélie Taquillain	16,757	37.27	−21.39
LFI (NUPÉS)	Sara Tij	11,117	24.73	N/A
Turnout		44,957	55.39	+11.31
LR gain from LREM				

=== 2017 ===
Legislative Election 2017: Hauts-de-Seine's 3rd constituency
Party	Candidate	Votes	%	±%
LREM	Christine Hennion	20,552	46.59	N/A
LR	Jean Spiri	11,316	25.65	−21.13
LFI	Virginie Kenler	3,009	6.82	N/A
PS	Isabelle Dahan	2,162	4.90	−27.61
FN	Floriane Deniau	1,748	3.96	−2.32
EELV	Joëlle Paris	1,494	3.39	−0.12
DVD	Grégoire Francois-Dainville	1,194	2.71	N/A
Others	N/A	2,634		
Turnout		44,109	54.41	−4.49
2nd round result
LREM	Christine Hennion	20,962	58.66	N/A
LR	Jean Spiri	14,772	41.34	−15.88
Turnout		35,734	44.08	−11.88
LREM gain from LR		Swing		

=== 2012 ===
Legislative Election 2012: Hauts,-de-Seine's 3rd constituency
Party	Candidate	Votes	%	±%
UMP	Jacques Kossowski	21,094	46.78	−10.01
PS	Jean-André Lasserre	14,656	32.51	+14.50
FN	Floriane Deniau	2,832	6.28	+3.42
AC	Florence Villedey	1,992	4.42	N/A
EELV	Anne Le Guenniou	1,584	3.51	+0.13
FG	Adélaïde Naturel	1,357	3.01	+1.55
Others	N/A	1,573		
Turnout		45,088	58.90	−2.23
2nd round result
UMP	Jacques Kossowski	24,510	57.22	N/A
PS	Jean-André Lasserre	18,328	42.78	N/A
Turnout		42,836	55.96	N/A
UMP hold				

=== 2007 ===
Legislative Election 2007: Hauts-de-Seine 3rd
Party	Candidate	Votes	%	±%
UMP	Jacques Kossowski	27,920	56.79	
PS	Jean-André Lasserre	8,853	18.01	
MoDem	Jean-Louis Ragot	5,359	10.90	
LV	Michel Barnoncel	1,414	2.88	
FN	Rémi Carillon	1,408	2.86	
LCR	Francine Royon	839	1.71	
Liberal Alternative	Arash Derambarsh	735	1.49	
PCF	Annick Herbin	716	1.46	
GE	Patricia Dore	566	1.15	
MPF	Louis Chagnon	512	1.04	
Independent	Hélène Pelissier	247	0.5	
LO	Françoise Marcel	205	0.42	
Independent	Sarah Berkouki	189	0.38	
MNR	Marie-Jeanne Souillart	149	0.3	
Independent	Catherine Triboulet	53	0.11	
Turnout		50,095	61.13	
UMP hold		Swing		

=== 2002 ===
Legislative Election 2002: Hauts-de-Seine's 3rd constituency
Party	Candidate	Votes	%	±%
UMP	Jacques Kossowski	25,758	55.25	
PS	Denise Davoust	10,679	22.91	
FN	Marie-Cecile Rabier	3,524	7.56	
LV	Claire Petit	1,260	2.70	
Others	N/A	5,397		
Turnout		47,155	67.73	
UMP hold				

=== 1997 ===
Legislative Election 1997: Hauts-de-Seine's 3rd constituency
Party	Candidate	Votes	%	±%
RPR	Jacques Kossowski*	10,001	24.83	
UDF	Jean-Yves Haby	8,686	21.56	
PS	Renaud Laheurte	8,523	21.16	
FN	Christian Perez	5,320	13.21	
PCF	Béatrice Galicier	1,863	4.62	
LV	Corrine Leroy-Burel	1,737	4.31	
LO	Anne-Marie Schwartz	1,077	2.67	
DVD	Laurent Poultier-Dumesnil	1,064	2.64	
GE	Amirouche Laidi	855	2.12	
Others	N/A	1,157		
Turnout		41,523	64.39	
2nd round result
RPR	Jacques Kossowski*	18,094	42.30	
PS	Renaud Laheurte	15,582	36.43	
UDF	Jean-Yves Haby	9,096	21.27	
Turnout		44,367	68.80	
RPR gain from UDF				

* RPR dissident

== Sources ==
- Official results of French elections from 1998: "Résultats électoraux officiels en France" (in French). Archived from the original on 20 December 2011.
