= 2021 The Republicans congress =

Internal primary election in France

- 1–2 December 2021 (1st round); 3–4 December 2021 (2nd round)
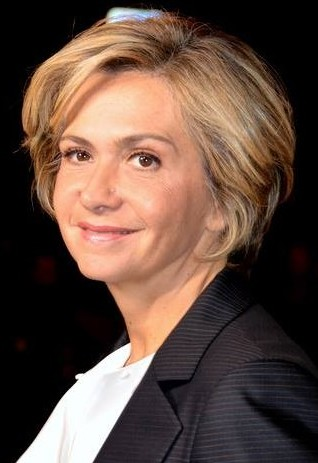

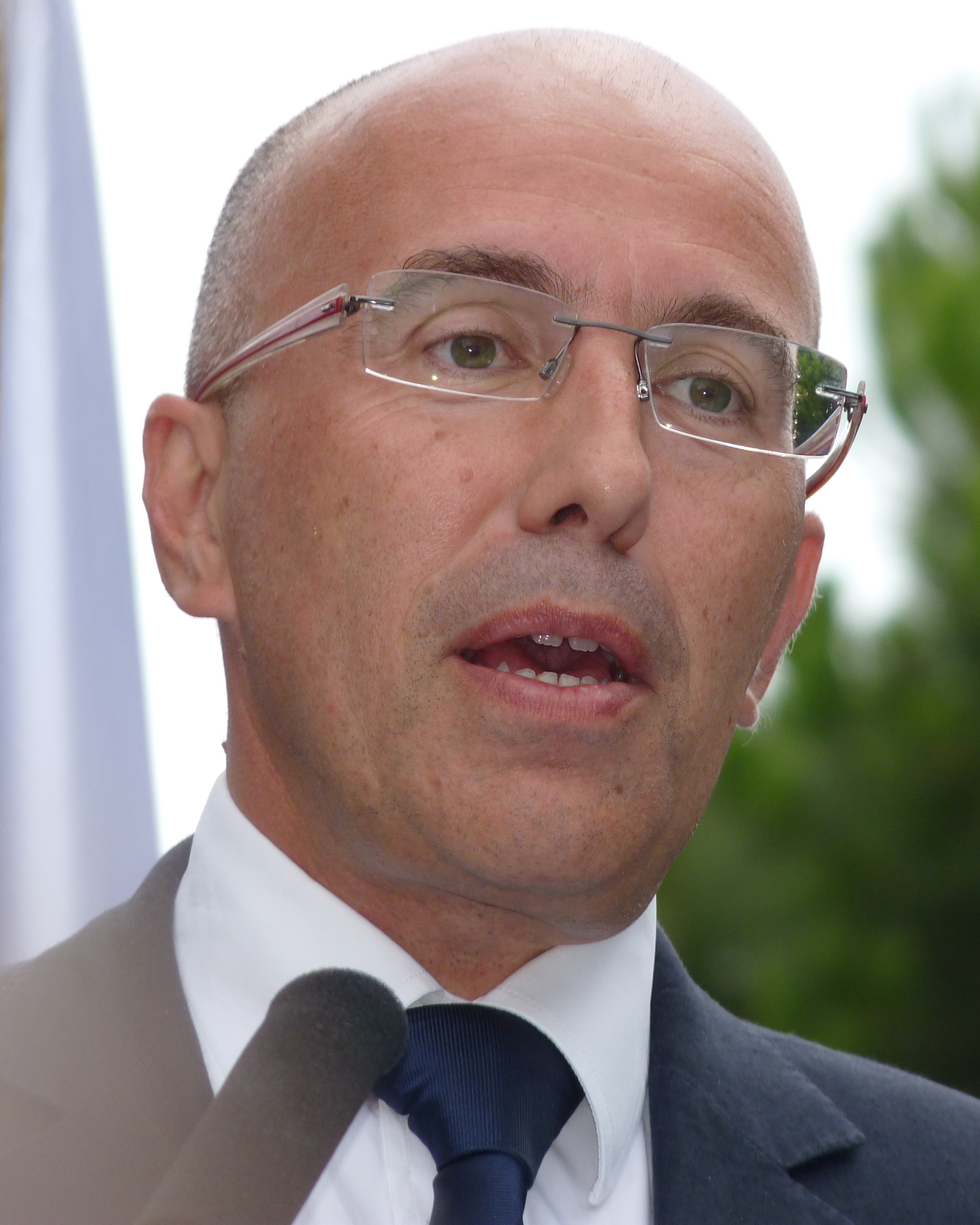

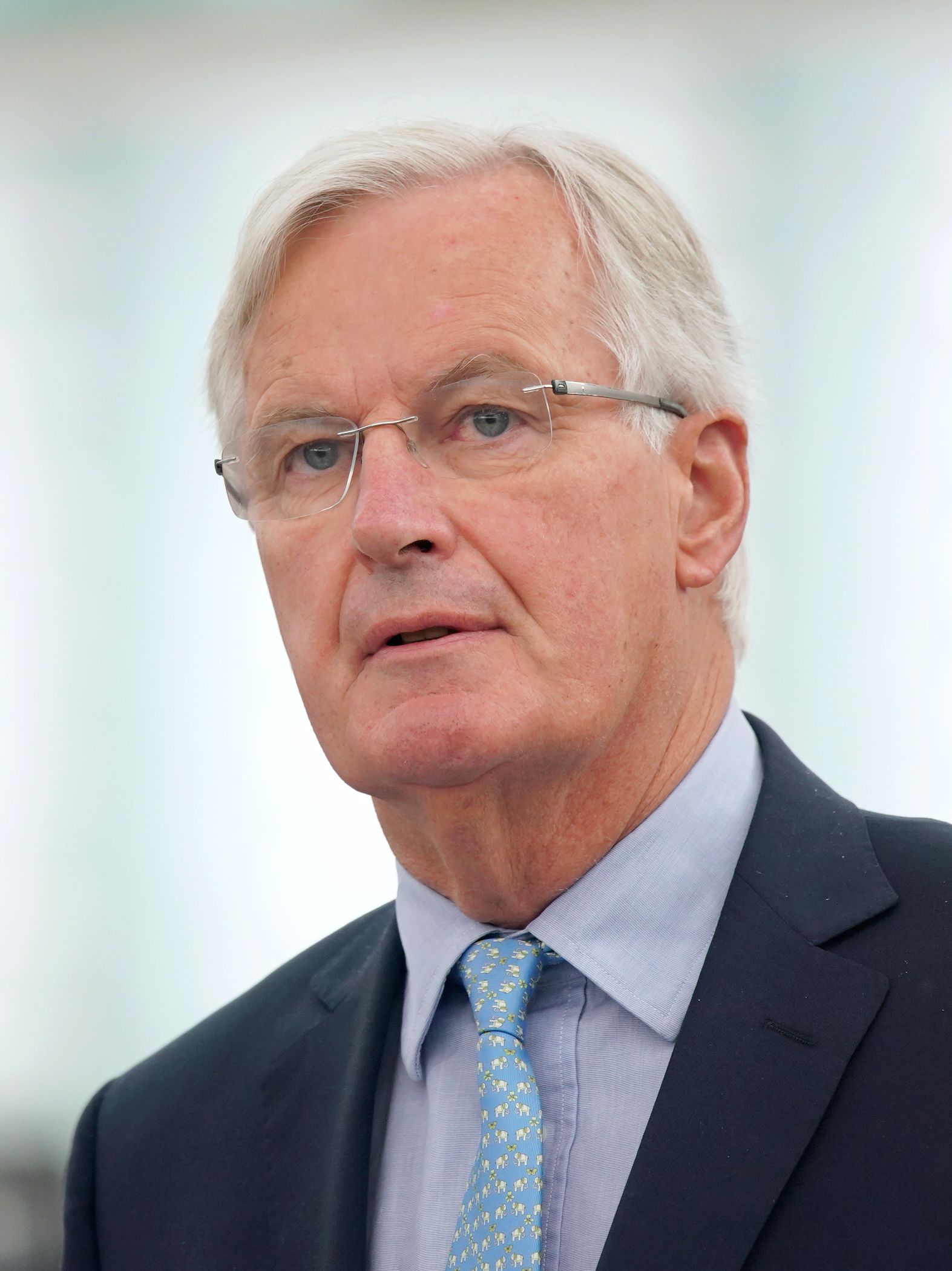

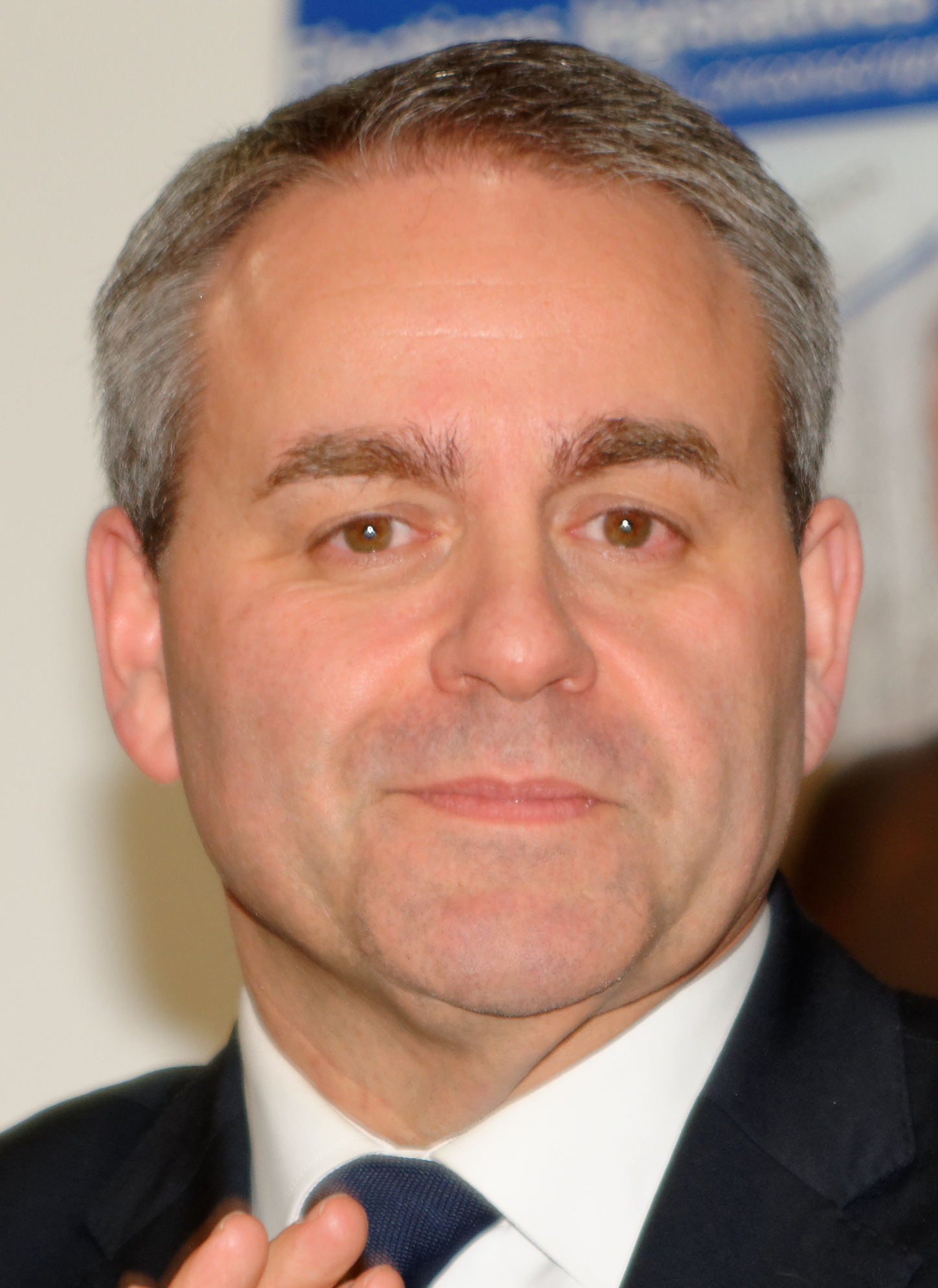
Candidate	Valérie Pécresse	Éric Ciotti
Party	LR	LR
Popular vote (1st)	28,179	28,844
Share (1st)	25.00%	25.58%
Popular vote (2nd)	69,326	44,412
Share (2nd)	60.95%	39.05%
Candidate	Michel Barnier	Xavier Bertrand
Party	LR	LR
Popular vote (1st)	26,970	25,213
Share (1st)	23.92%	22.36%
Popular vote (2nd)	Eliminated	Eliminated
Previous LR nominee
François Fillon
LR nominee
Valérie Pécresse

The 2021 The Republicans (LR) congress, also known as the Congress for France (French: Congrès pour la France), was an organised internal primary held from 1 to 4 December. It was organised by the party in order to nominate the candidate that would represent it in the 2022 presidential election. Valérie Pécresse was chosen as the party's presidential nominee in a two-round voting process.

== Context ==
After François Fillon failed to reach the second round in the 2017 presidential election, Les Republicains were in opposition to centrist President Emmanuel Macron, who recruited several LR figures and adopted similar policies in some regards, especially around social policy. After a major failure in the 2019 European elections, Les Républicains did well in the 2020 municipal elections as well as in the 2021 regional and departmental elections.

The party was divided on the method of selecting its candidate for the 2022 presidential election. In 2016, the party had used an open primary, which brought a record 4.4 million voters in, but the surprise winner François Fillon did not manage to qualify for the run-off, and left the party weakened between Macron-compatible and right-wing factions. The polls for the 2022 election did not indicate that any candidate was emerging as a natural favorite, and the party may lose some votes on the right flank of the party to independent candidate Éric Zemmour.

On September 25, 2021, a consultation reserved for 79,000 LR members decided on the candidate selection process. 58% of voters choose a “closed” (internal) primary against 40.4% for an “open” primary and 1.6% of voters were blank. The statutes were amended accordingly, establishing a commission to filter the candidacies as well. There was also a possibility of revoking the support for the nominated candidate in order not to repeat the fiasco caused by the Fillon affair.

== Voting method ==
=== Dates and voters ===
The first round took place online from 8am on 1 December to 2pm on 2 December 2021. A second round was scheduled for 3 and 4 December 2021; if no candidate obtained more than 50% of the votes cast (which was the case), then the second round would be a run-off between the two candidates with the most votes.

Only members of Les Republicains could vote. At the deadline for signing up, the party had around 150,000 members, of whom 139,918 registered to vote.

=== Applications ===
Each candidate must be sponsored by at least 250 LR elected representatives, spread over at least 30 departments (without more than a tenth of the signatories of the presentation being able to come from the same department).

=== Organisation and control ===
The organising committee of the primary was responsible for defining the practical details of the process and ensuring that it ran smoothly. It was composed of:

- Christian Jacob, president of LR and the president of the organising committee
- Annie Genevard, deputy vice-president of LR
- Aurélien Pradié, Secretary General of LR
- Daniel Fasquelle, national treasurer of LR
- Damien Abad, president of the LR group at the National Assembly
- Bruno Retailleau, president of the LR group in the Senate
- Bernard Deflesselles, representative of Xavier Bertrand
- Patrick Stefanini, representative of Valérie Pécresse
- Marie-Claire Carrère-Gée, representative of Michel Barnier
- François Varlet, representative of Philippe Juvin
- Alexandra Borchio-Fontimp, representative of Éric Ciotti

The control body was responsible for validating the composition of the electorate, the admissibility of candidatures and the sincerity of the results. It was composed of:

- Philippe Bas, senator
- Olivier Dutheillet de Lamothe, Honorary State Councillor
- Rémi-Pierre Drai, lawyer

== Candidates ==
The supervisory body admitted applications from six participants on 13 October 2021: Michel Barnier, Xavier Bertrand, Éric Ciotti, Philippe Juvin, Denis Payre and Valérie Pécresse. However, Denis Payre did not receive the necessary 250 sponsorships.

=== Candidates who met the support requirement ===
Candidate (name and age)	Political function(s) exercised during the campaign	Details
Michel Barnier (70 years old)	None	Barnier has been a minister several times, a member of the national assembly and a European commissioner. He is well known for acting as chief negotiator of the European Union responsible for the Brexit negotiations with the UK between 2016 and 2021. He announced his candidacy on 26 August 2021. He was expected to be quite a moderate candidate, but ran an unexpectedly radical campaign, with strong rhetoric on immigration and support of bringing back the death penalty.
Xavier Bertrand (56 years old)	President of the Hauts-de-France regional council (since 2016)	The minister of Labour and Health under the presidency of Nicolas Sarkozy, he was elected president of the Hauts-de-France regional council in 2016. He left Les Republicains in 2017 and announced his candidacy on 24 March 2021 without going through a possible primary from the right. He finally agreed to appear at the Congress of Republicans on 11 October 2021 and aligned himself with LR. Bertrand was historically on the moderate wing of the party, but recently he has drifted to the right, opposing same sex marriage for example.
Éric Ciotti (56 years old)	Member of the National Assembly for Alpes-Maritimes (since 2007)	Member of the National Assembly since 2007 and member of the general then departmental council of the Alpes-Maritimes (of which he held the presidency until 2017) since 2008, Ciotti announced his candidacy on 26 August 2021. Ciotti was an outsider in this election, coming from the hard right wing of the party. His policies are moderately close to that of Le Pen, wanting to extend the terms of the presidency and abolish regions in France.
Philippe Juvin (57 years old)	Mayor of La Garenne-Colombes (since 2001)	Mayor of La Garenne-Colombes since 2001, MEP between 2009 and 2019, he also served as professor of medicine (anesthesia, resuscitation, then emergency medicine) and head of the emergency department of the Georges-Pompidou European hospital. He announced his candidacy on July 26, 2021.
Valérie Pécresse (54 years old)	President of the Ile-de-France regional council (since 2015)	Several times minister and member of the National Assembly, regional councillor of Île-de-France since 2004 then president of the regional council of the same region since 2015, Pécresse announced her candidacy on 22 July 2021. She then rejoined LR, two years after leaving the party. She is staunchly right wing on matters of security, but ran her campaign on the more moderate side.

=== Eliminated candidates ===
Candidate (name and age)	Political function (s) exercised during the campaign	Details
Denis Payre (58 years old)	None	Entrepreneur by profession, founder of the Nous Citoyens party in 2013, he announced his candidacy on August 29, 2021, after joining LR. He did not obtain the 250 sponsorships of elected officials that was needed for candidacy. However, he denounced the "undemocratic" behaviour of the LR leaders, pointing to the fact that his candidacy was only validated in mid-October, leaving “only two weeks” to collect his signatures. He sent an appeal to the party leaders.

== Polls ==
The percentages in bold show which two candidates would advance to the second round.

Sounder	Dated	Panel		Barnier	Bertrand	Ciotti	Juvin	Payre	Pécresse
Ifop	Oct 28-29	1,507	All French People	21	**34**	9	10	-	**26**
Ifop	Oct 28-29	-	Right-wing sympathizers	22	**35**	9	10	-	**24**
Ipsos-Sopra Steria	Sept 2-3	925	All French People	17	**36**	8	6	4	**29**
Ipsos-Sopra Steria	Sept 2-3	-	LR Sympathizers - UDI	22	**39**	5	2	3	**29**

== Results ==
The results of the first round of voting were announced on 2 December 2021. A run-off was held between Ciotti and Pecresse on 3 December 2021, with the result being released the day after. The first round's outcome has been called surprising, with Ciotti outperforming what was expected and Bertrand, the expected front runner, fell into fourth. Bertrand declared his endorsement of Pécresse in the second round soon after the results came in. In the second round, Pécresse came out on top with over 60% of the vote.

Candidate	Party	First round		Second round	
Candidate	Party	Votes	%	Votes	%
**Valérie Pécresse**	**LR - SL**	28,179	25.00	**69,326**	**60.95**
Éric Ciotti	LR	**28,844**	**25.59**	44,412	39.05
Michel Barnier	LR	26,970	23.93		
Xavier Bertrand	LR	25,213	22.36		
Philippe Juvin	LR	3,532	3.13		
Registered		139,742	100.00	139,742	100.00
Voters		113,038	80.89		
Valid votes		112,738	99.73	113,738	
Blank/invalid ballots		300	0.27		
