= Castroville, Texas =

- City
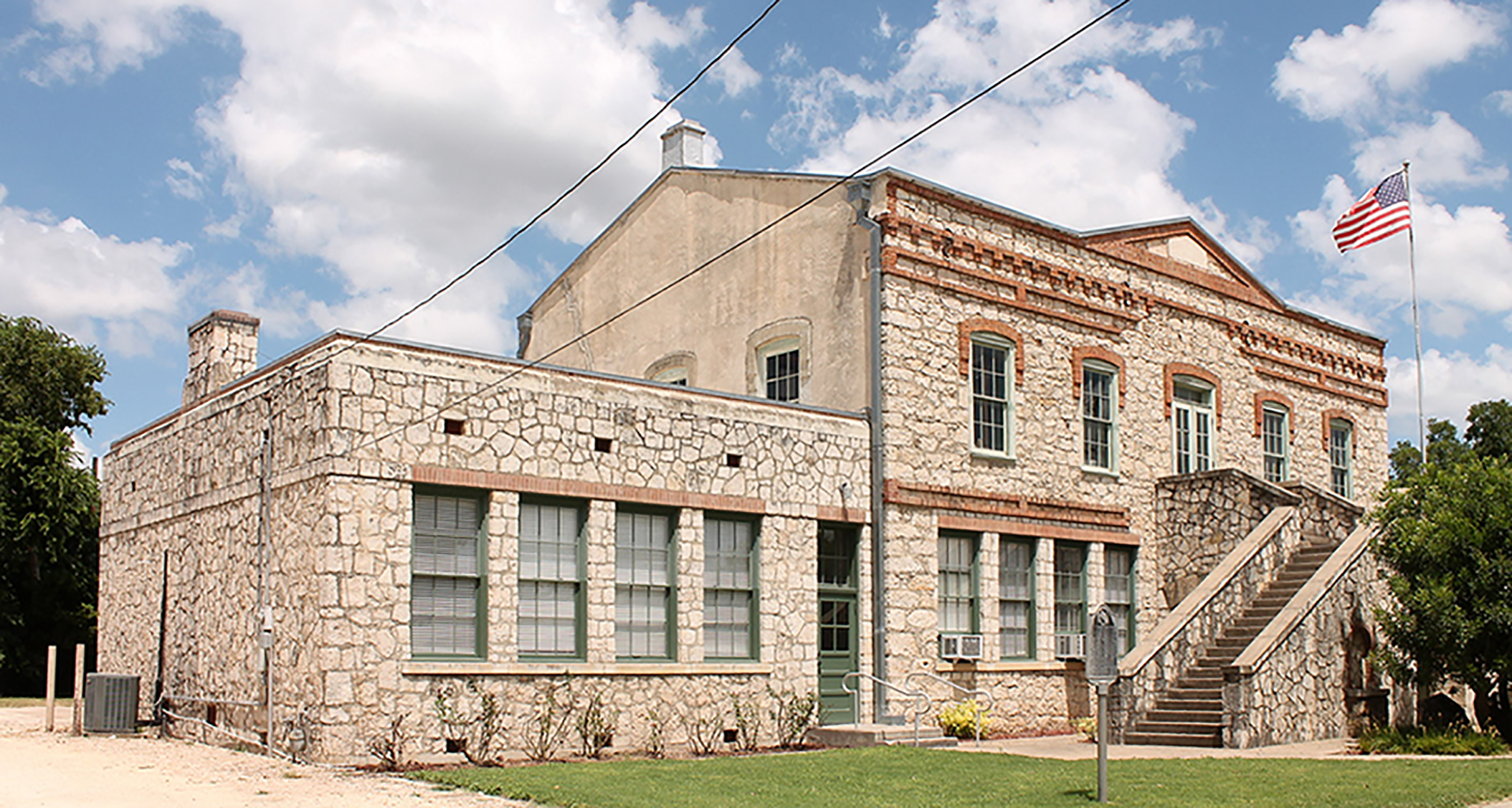
- Castroville City Hall

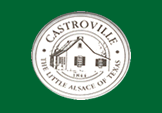
- Seal
- Nickname: The Little Alsace of Texas
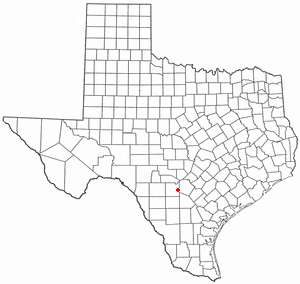
- Location of Castroville, Texas

- Coordinates: 29°20′50″N 98°52′12″W
- Country: United States
- State: Texas
- County: Medina
- Incorporated: January 16, 1850

Government
  - Type: Council-Manager
  - City Council: Mayor J Darrin Schroeder
  - City Manager: R Scott Dixon

Area
  - Total: 2.92 sq mi (7.55 km^{2})
  - Land: 2.88 sq mi (7.46 km^{2})
  - Water: 0.035 sq mi (0.09 km^{2})
- Elevation: 771 ft (235 m)

Population (2020)
  - Total: 2,954
  - Density: 1,030/sq mi (396/km^{2})
- Time zone: UTC-6 (Central (CST))
  - Summer (DST): UTC-5 (CDT)
- ZIP codes: 78009, 78023
- Area code: 830
- FIPS code: 48-13312
- GNIS feature ID: 2409411
- Website: castrovilletx.gov

Castroville is a city in Medina County, Texas, United States. Its population was 2,954 at the 2020 census, up from 2,680 at the 2010 census. It is part of the San Antonio–New Braunfels, Texas metropolitan statistical area. Castroville was founded by immigrants from Alsace, France, during a high-emigration period of the mid-1800s. Most Alsatians came to Castroville due to economic hardships in the French border region with Germany, and many of them spoke Alsatian dialect (a dialect of Germanic origin that borrows heavily from French). The Alsatian culture and language are still kept alive by the residents of Castroville. Prior to 1893, Castroville was the first county seat of Medina County.

== History ==
Castroville was established in 1844 by Henri Castro, an empresario of the Republic of Texas, who brought several dozen German, and French families such as the Boheme, Haby, Burges, Hoog, and Mcmullen families, to the area from Alsace, Switzerland, and adjoining Baden to populate his land grant along the Medina River, 20 miles (32 km) west of San Antonio. The first colonists disembarked at Galveston on January 9, 1843. They were taken by ship to Lavaca Bay and traveled overland to San Antonio, where they took shelter in abandoned buildings until the Texas Rangers were prepared to escort them to their land and protect them from hostile Indians. On September 2, 1844, the first colonists arrived at Castro's land grant on the Medina River.

From 1849, Castroville, on the Medina River, was a water stop on the San Antonio-El Paso Road and a stagecoach station on the San Antonio-El Paso Mail Line and San Antonio-San Diego Mail Line.

After a few hard years, the town and surrounding farms flourished, but for generations, the residents remained insular. In Castroville's first century, a visitor would be more likely to hear Alsatian than English spoken in the town's homes, stores, and taverns. Modern Alsatian travelers noted that the dialect spoken in Castroville was more like that which was spoken in the 1840s. The descendants of the original settlers worked diligently to preserve their language, whose usage in Europe has been diminished by the political actions of France and Germany, especially since World War II.

The Steinbach Haus(originally built between 1618 and 1648 in Wahlbach, Alsace) was dismantled and reconstructed in Castroville in 1998. It was opened to the public in 2002.

== Sister cities ==
Castroville has two twin towns:

- Ensisheim, (Alsace) France - 2009
- Eguisheim, (Alsace) France - 1975

== Geography ==
Castroville is located 26 miles west of downtown San Antonio.

According to the United States Census Bureau, the city has a total area of 2.5 square miles (6.5 km^{2}), of which 0.39% is covered with water.

=== Transportation ===
U.S. Route 90 runs east-west through the center of Castroville, leading west 16 miles (26 km) to Hondo and east roughly 25 miles (40 km) to downtown San Antonio. The closest airport with commercial airline service is San Antonio International Airport, on the north side of San Antonio 30 miles (48 km) to the east.

== Demographics ==
Historical population
Census	Pop.	Note	%±
1850	366		—
1860	458		25.1%
1870	515		12.4%
1880	731		41.9%
1890	679		−7.1%
1950	985		—
1960	1,508		53.1%
1970	1,893		25.5%
1980	1,821		−3.8%
1990	2,159		18.6%
2000	2,664		23.4%
2010	2,680		0.6%
2020	2,954		10.2%
U.S. Decennial Census

=== Racial and ethnic composition ===
Castroville city, Texas – Racial composition Note: the US Census treats Hispanic/Latino as an ethnic category. This table excludes Latinos from the racial categories and assigns them to a separate category. Hispanics/Latinos may be of any race.
Race (NH = Non-Hispanic)	% 2020	% 2010	% 2000	Pop 2020	Pop 2010	Pop 2000
White alone (NH)	54.8%	59.9%	61.9%	1,620	1,605	1,650
Black alone (NH)	0.7%	0.5%	0.1%	21	14	3
American Indian alone (NH)	0.3%	0.3%	0.2%	8	8	6
Asian alone (NH)	0.6%	0.7%	0.8%	19	18	21
Pacific Islander alone (NH)	0%	0%	0.1%	1	0	2
Other race alone (NH)	0.3%	0.1%	0%	10	2	0
Multiracial (NH)	1.6%	0.6%	0.9%	47	16	23
Hispanic/Latino (any race)	41.6%	37.9%	36%	1,228	1,017	959

=== 2020 census ===
As of the 2020 census, Castroville had a population of 2,954, with 1,111 households and 860 families residing in the city. The median age was 43.0 years; 22.8% of the residents were under 18 and 21.5% were 65 or older. The female/male rattio was 1:0.945 overall and 1:0.900 for those 18 and over.

None of the residents lived in urban areas, while 100.0% lived in rural areas.

Of the 1,111 households in Castroville, 33.1% had children under 18 living in them, 52.8% were married-couple households, 15.5% were households with a male householder and no spouse or partner present, and 27.2% were households with a female householder and no spouse or partner present. About 22.5% of all households were made up of individuals, and 10.6% had someone living alone who was 65 or older.

The city had 1,227 housing units, of which 9.5% were vacant. Among occupied housing units, 71.2% were owner-occupied and 28.8% were renter-occupied. The homeowner vacancy rate was 1.0% and the rental vacancy rate was 11.3%.

The most commonly reported ancestries were Mexican (36%), German (21%), English (11.5%), Irish (9.1%), Alsatian (5%), and French (3.4%).

Racial composition as of the 2020 census
Race	Percentage
White	69.6%
Black or African American	0.8%
American Indian and Alaska Native	0.8%
Asian	0.7%
Native Hawaiian and other Pacific Islander	<0.1%
Some other race	8.9%
Two or more races	19.1%
Hispanic or Latino (of any race)	41.6%

=== 2010 census ===
As of the 2010 census, 3,053 people resided in the city. The population density was 1,045.4 inhabitants per square mile (403.6/km^{2}). The 1,025 housing units had an average density of 402.2 per square mile (155.3/km^{2}).

Of the 941 households, 37.4% had children under 18 living with them, 61.5% were married couples living together, 10.4% had a female householder with no husband present, and 23.5% were not families. About 20.5% of all households were made up of individuals, and 8.7% had someone living alone who was 65 or older. The average household size was 2.74, and the average family size was 3.17.

In the city, the population was distributed as 28.0% under 18, 6.9% from 18 to 24, 27.7% from 25 to 44, 21.7% from 45 to 64, and 15.6% who were 65 or older. The median age was 37 years. For every 100 females, there were 97.2 males. For every 100 females age 18 and over, there were 88.3 males.

The median income in the city for a household was $42,308 and for a family was $51,007. Males had a median income of $35,625 versus $27,228 for females. The per capita income for the city was $20,615. About 5.4% of families and 9.1% of the population were below the poverty line, including 11.9% of those under 18 and 5.9% of those 65 or over.

== Education ==
The City of Castroville is served by the Medina Valley Independent School District (prekindergarten-grade 12), Saint Louis Catholic School (prekindergarten-grade 5), and Moye Catholic School (grades 6-12).

== Gallery ==
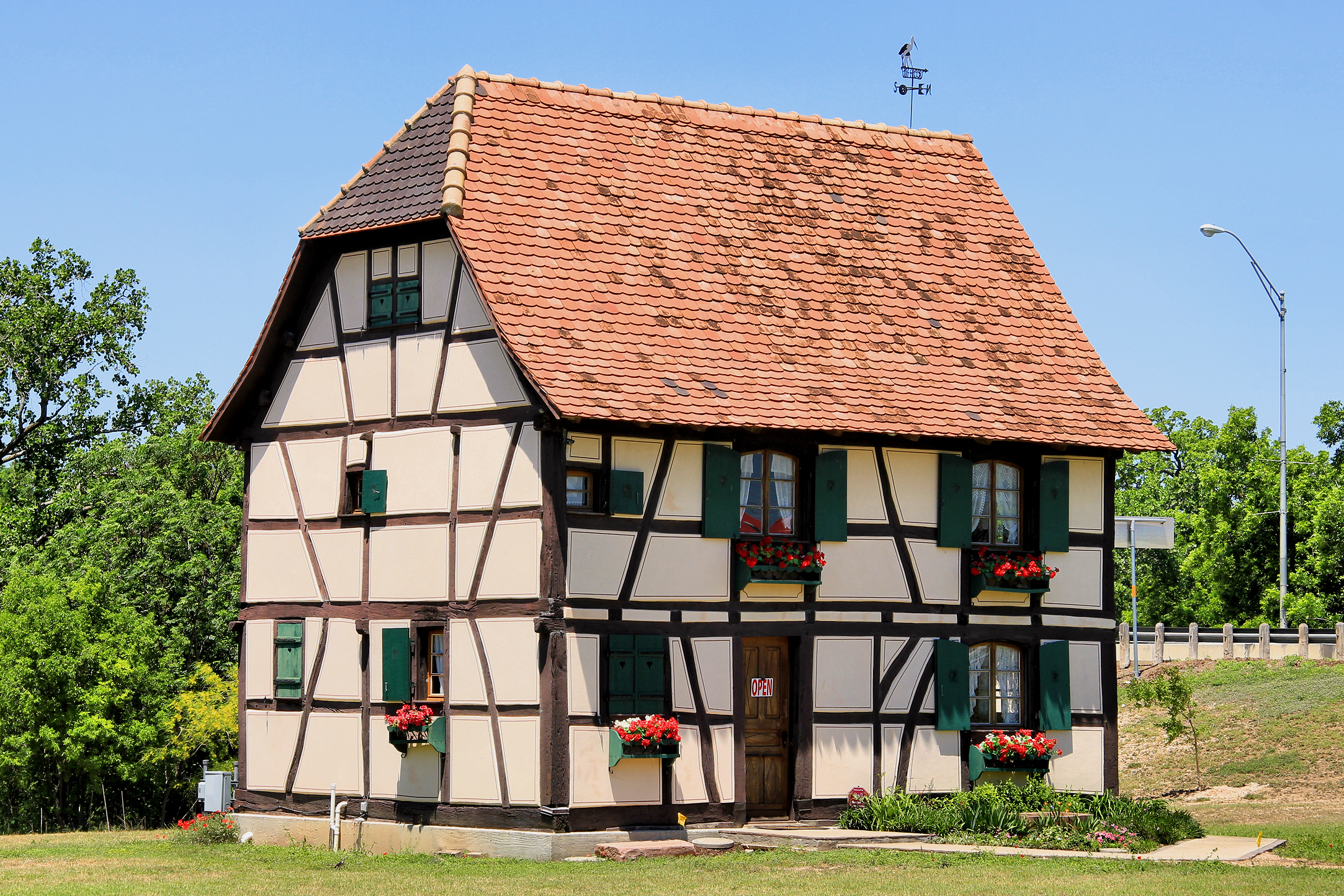
The Steinbach Alsatian House

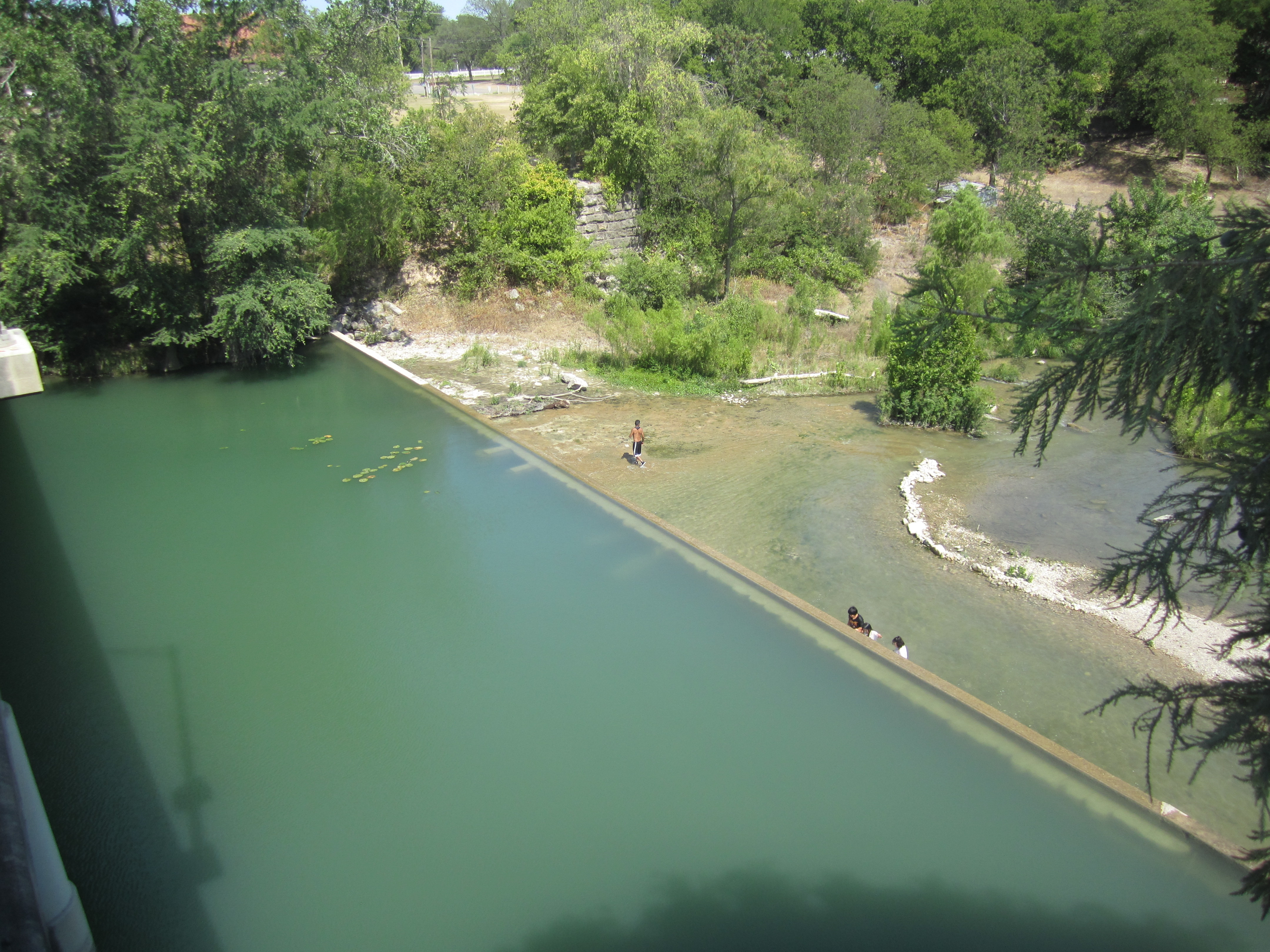
Waders cool off in the Medina River in Castroville.

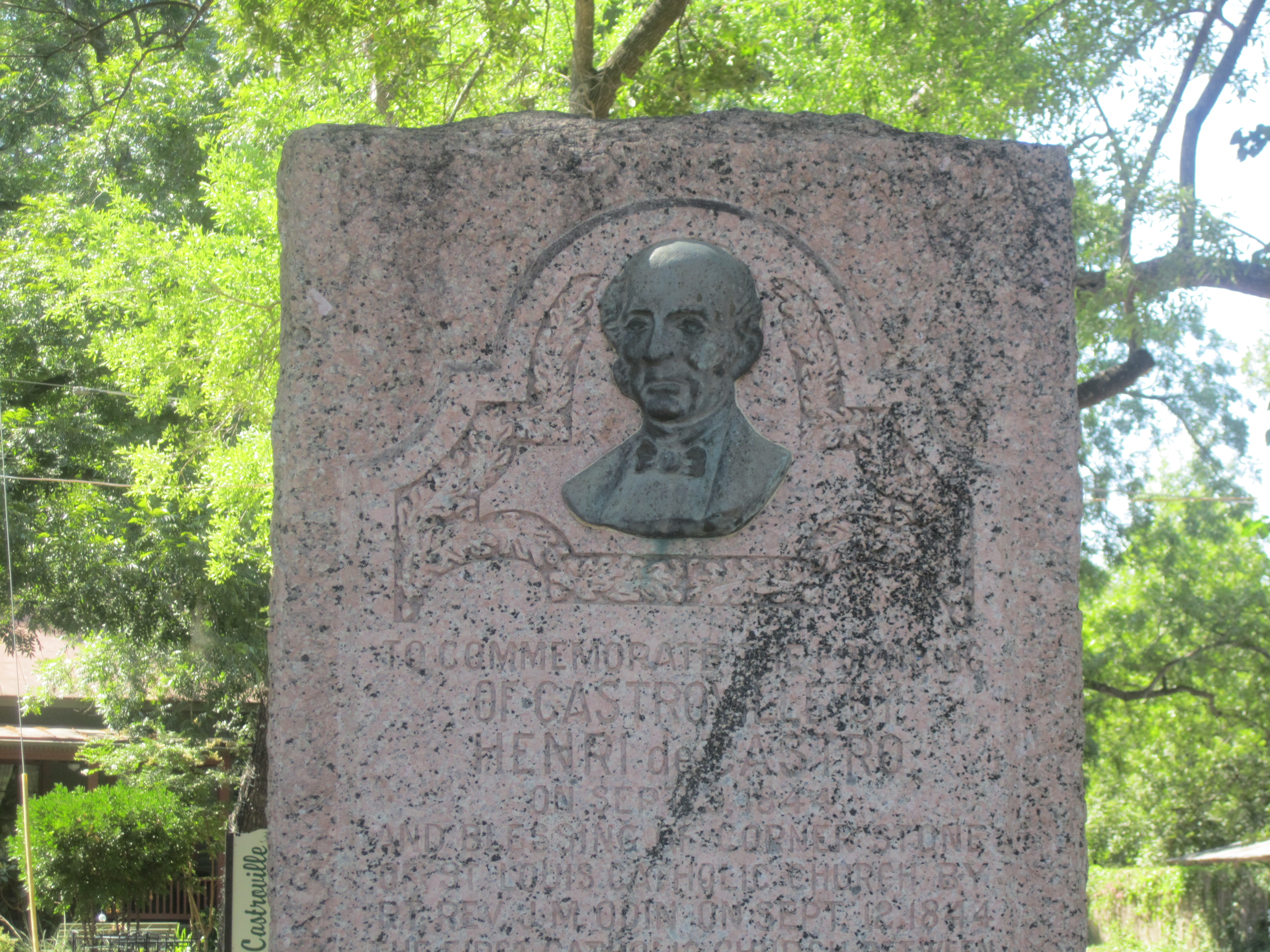
Monument to Henri Castro

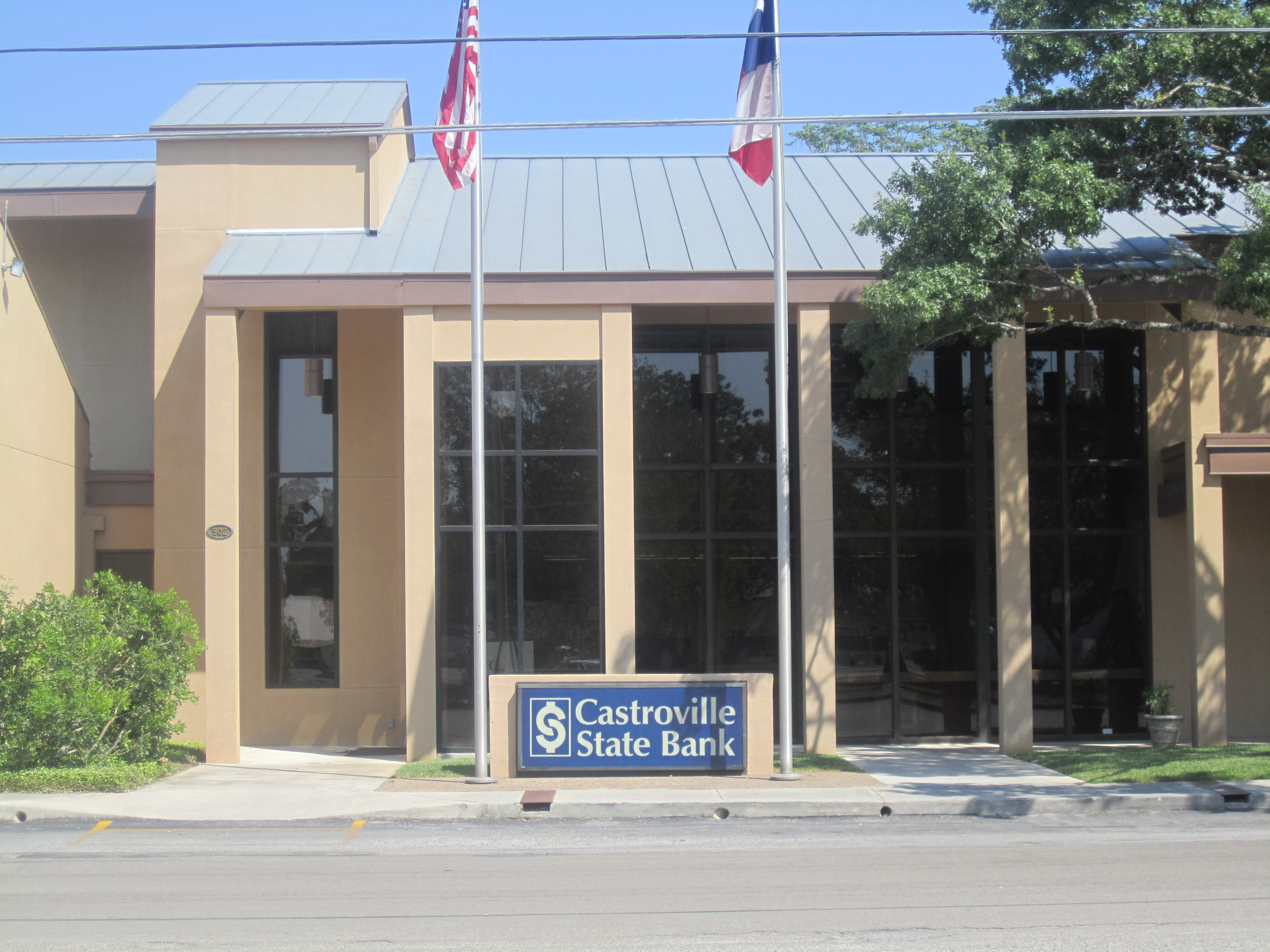
Castroville State Bank

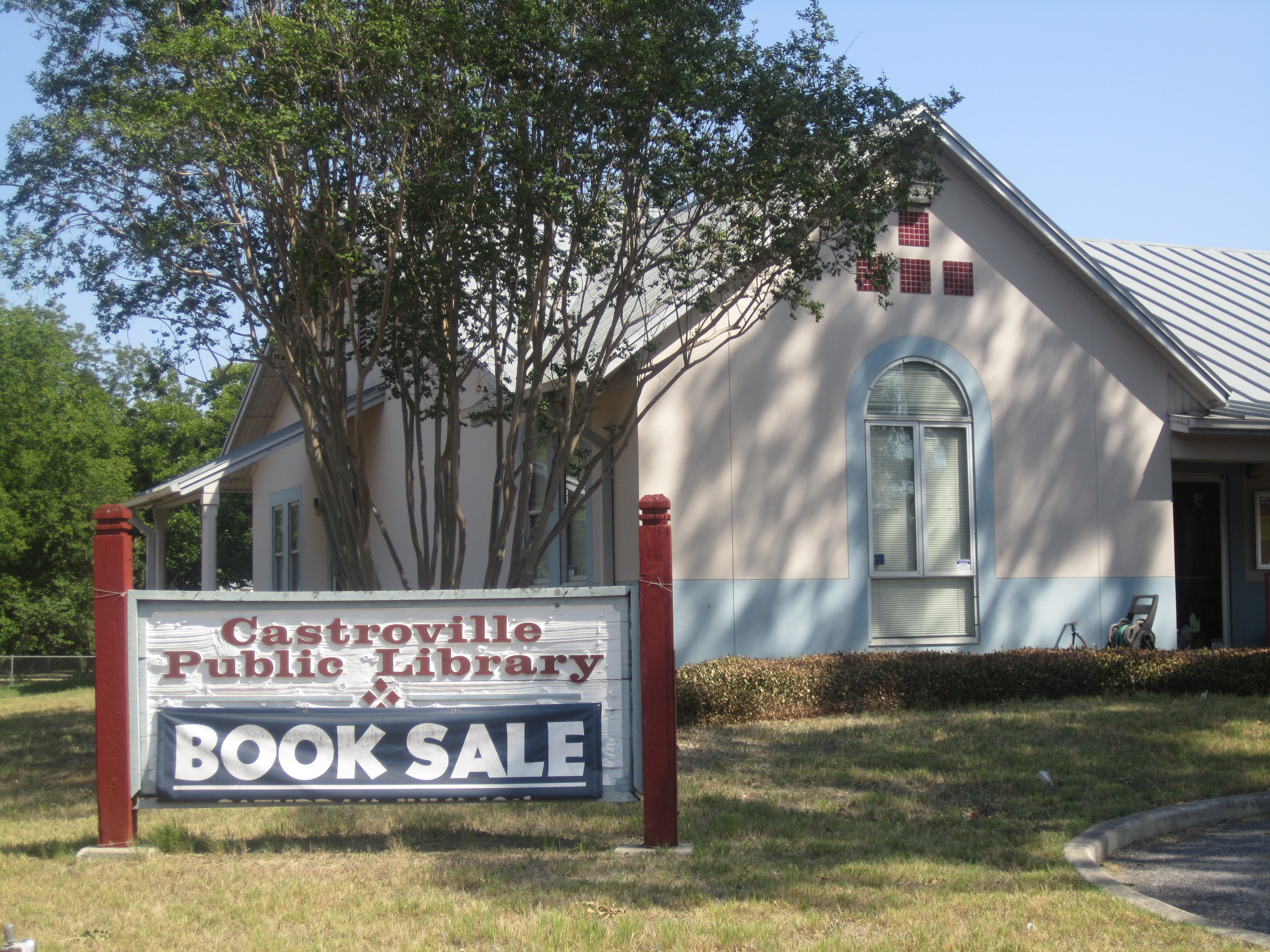
Castroville Public Library

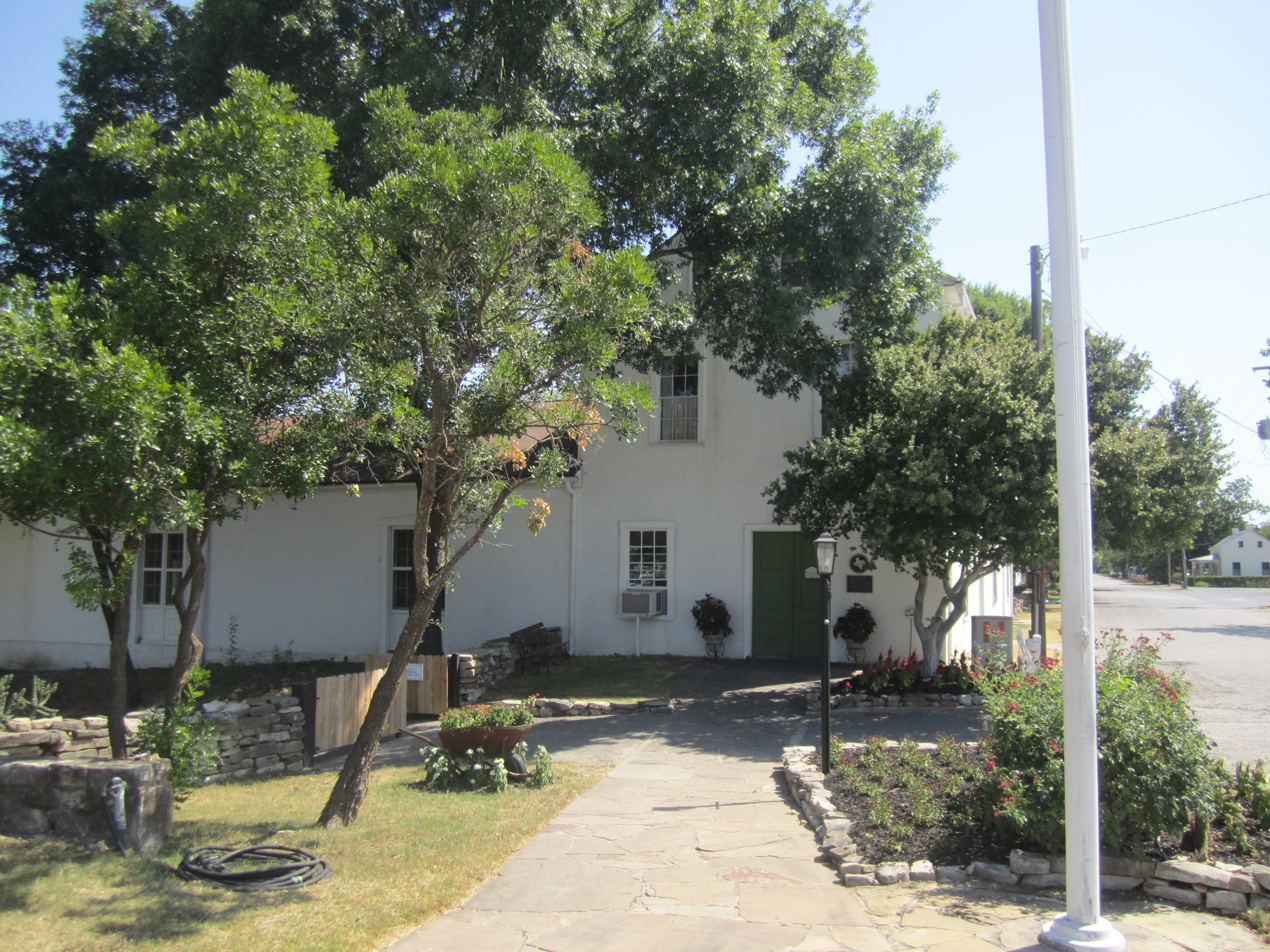
Trees shade the entrance to the Landmark Inn, a historic site in Castroville.

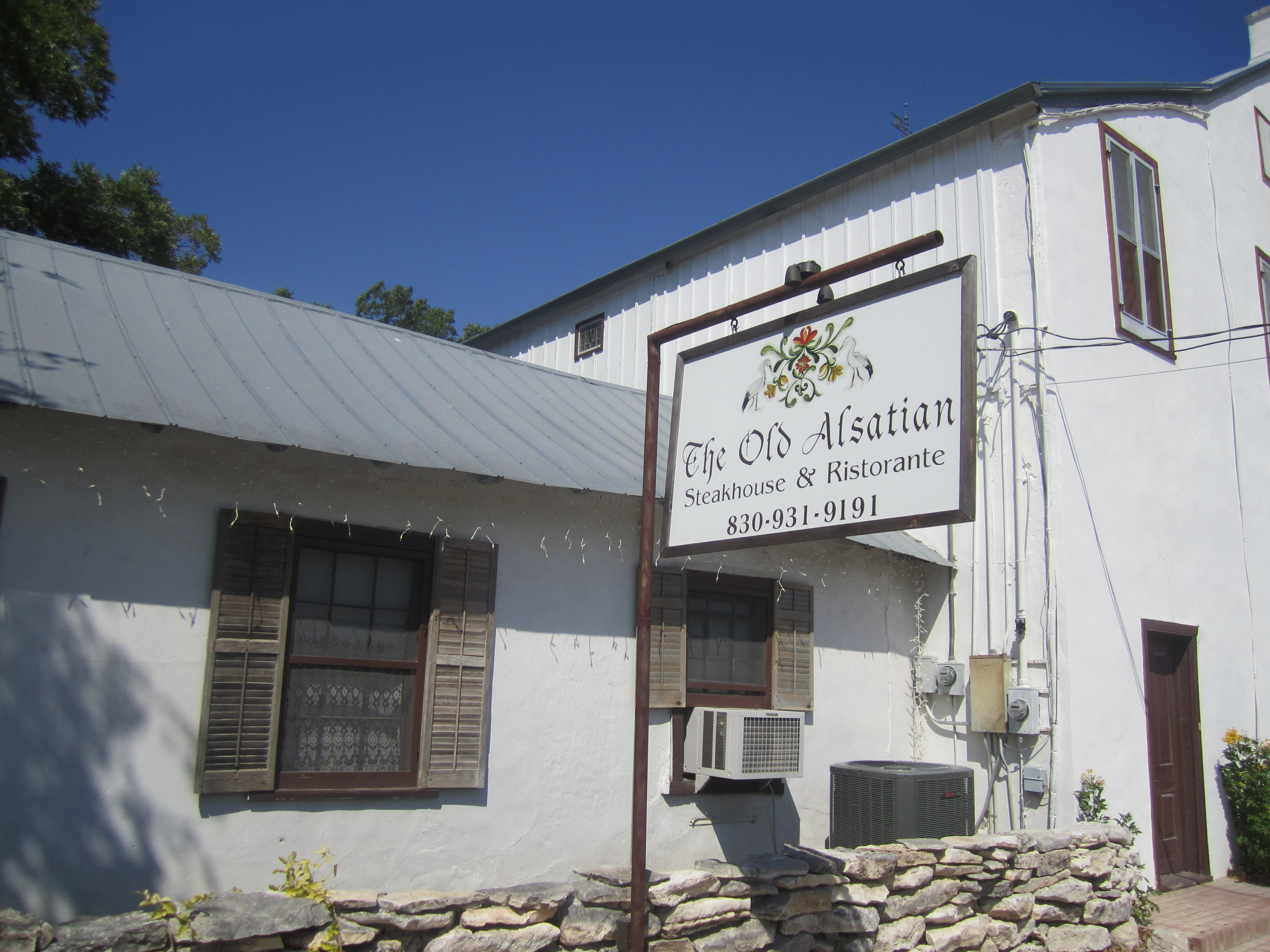
The Old Alsatian Steakhouse and Ristorante in the historic district of Castroville. The steakhouse closed in 2020.

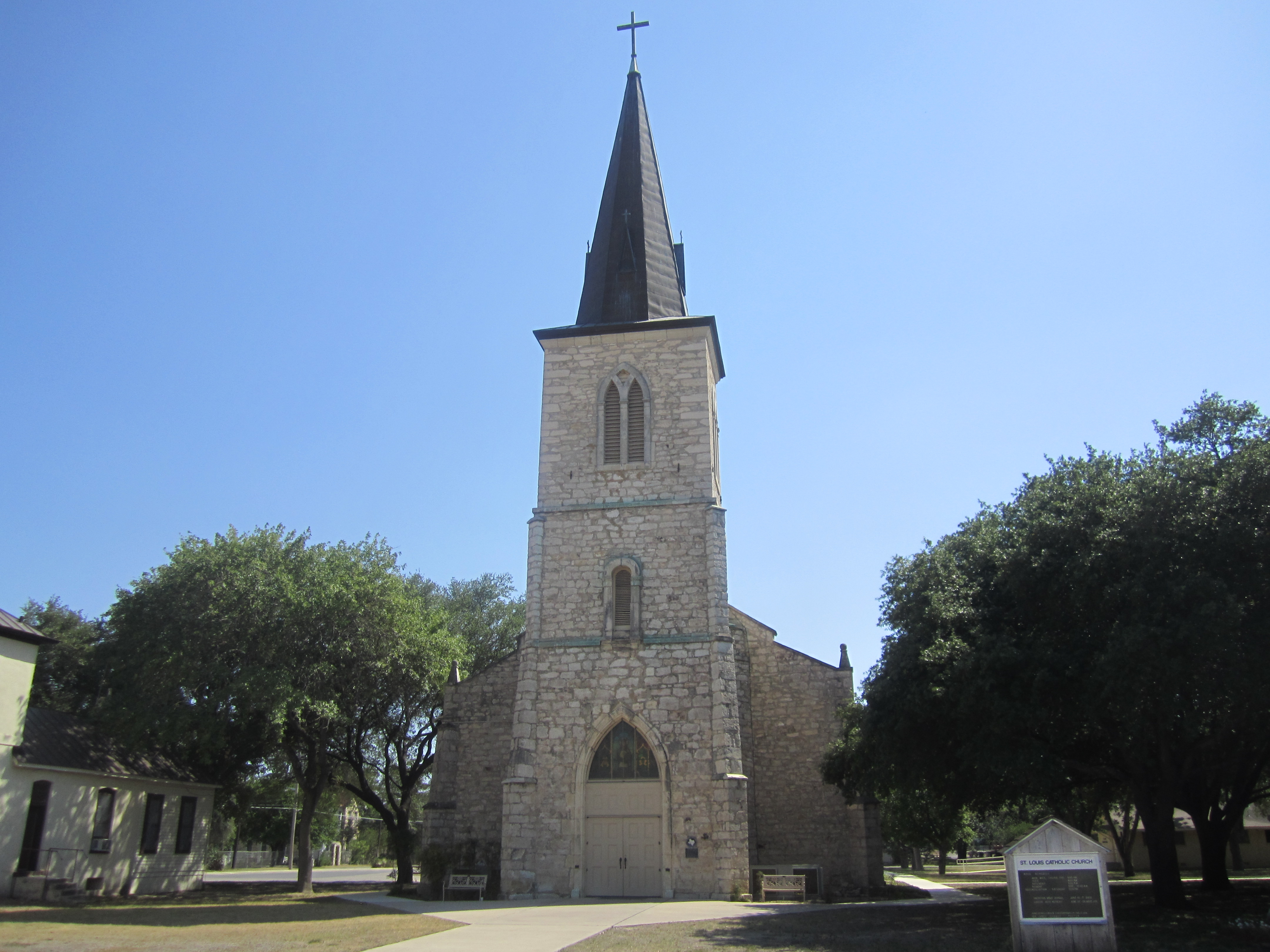
The historic St. Louis Catholic Church is located in downtown Castroville; pastor James Conway (2011).

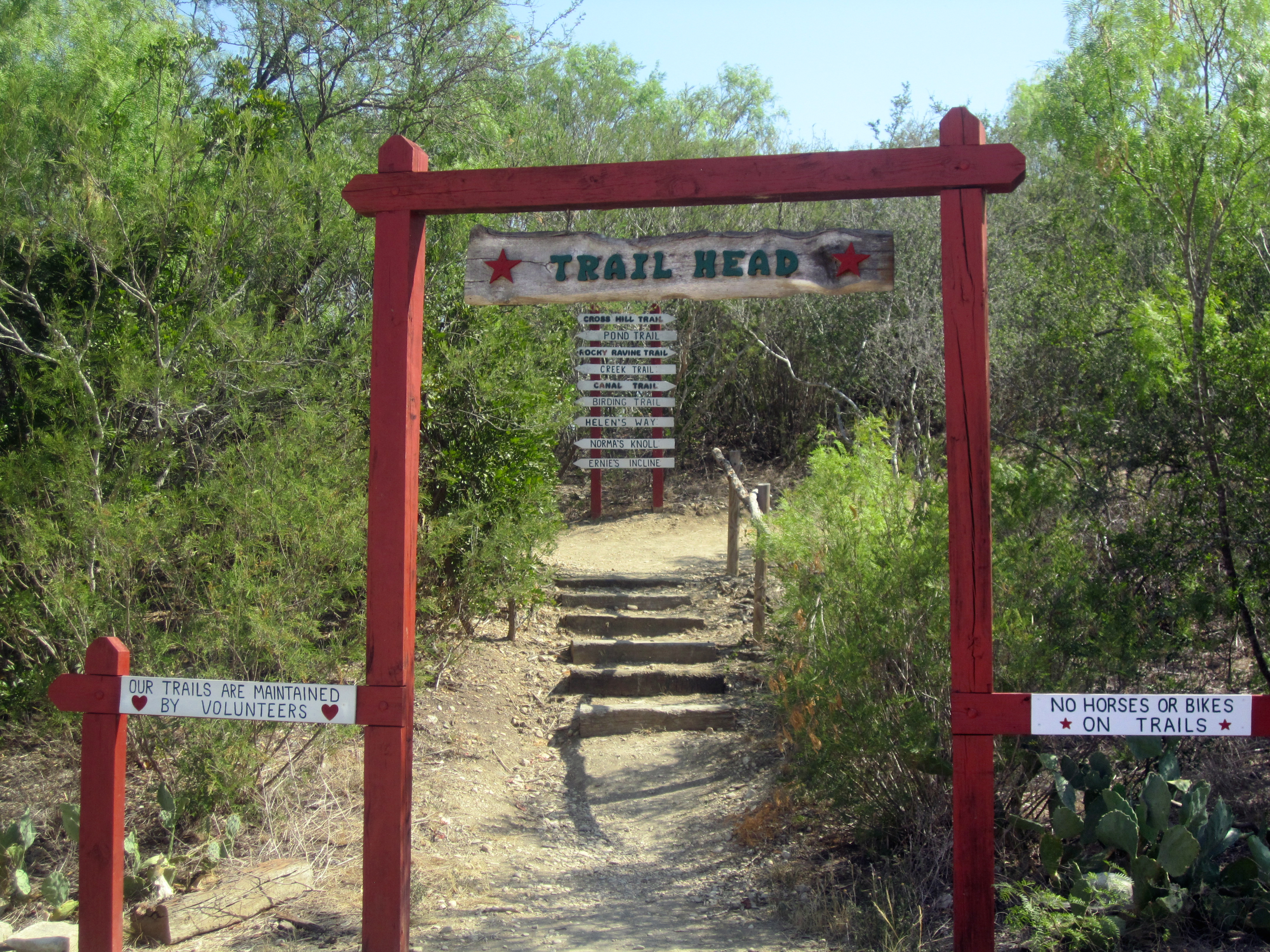
Trailhead at Castroville Regional Park

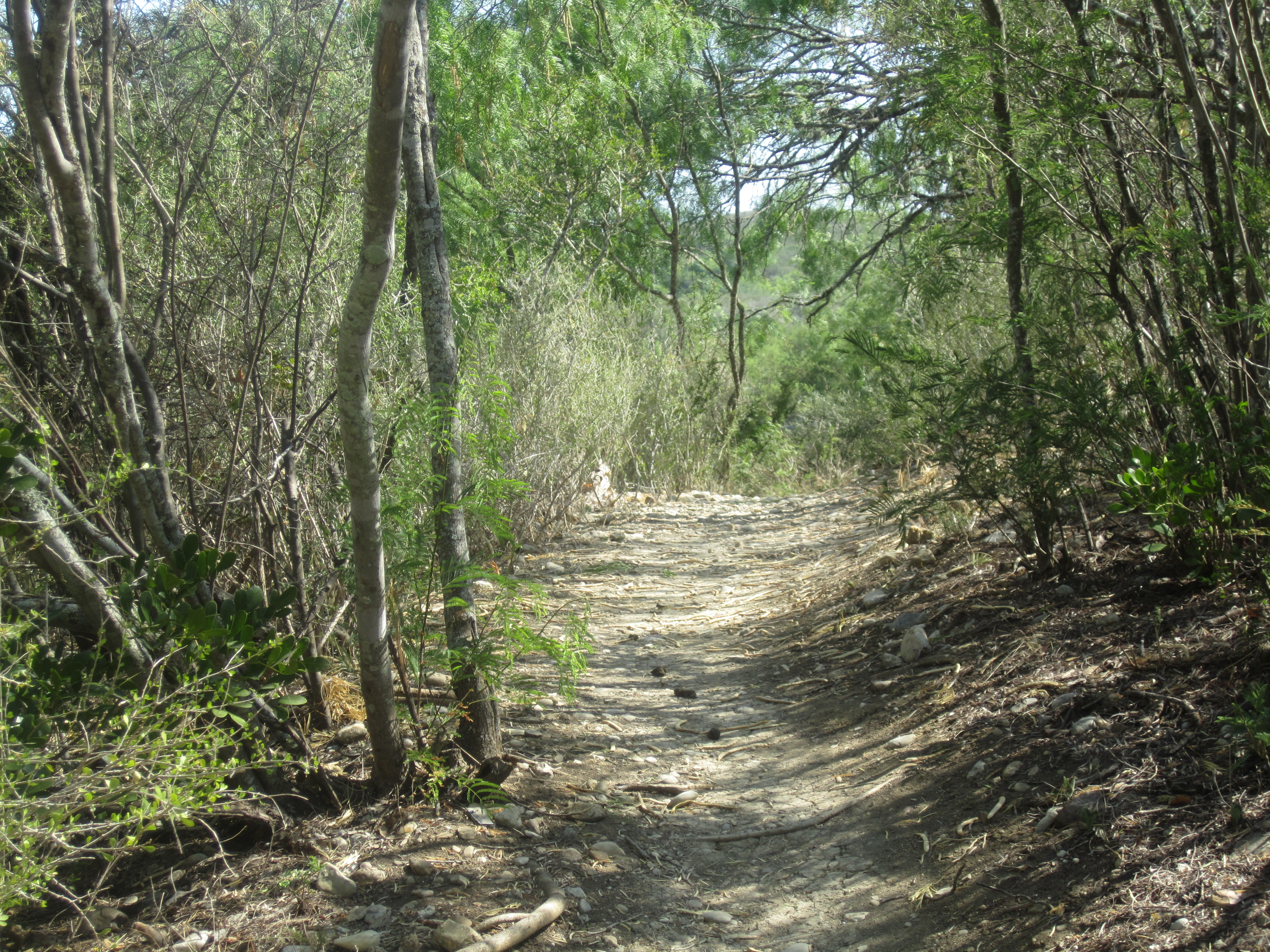
On the hiking trail in Castroville

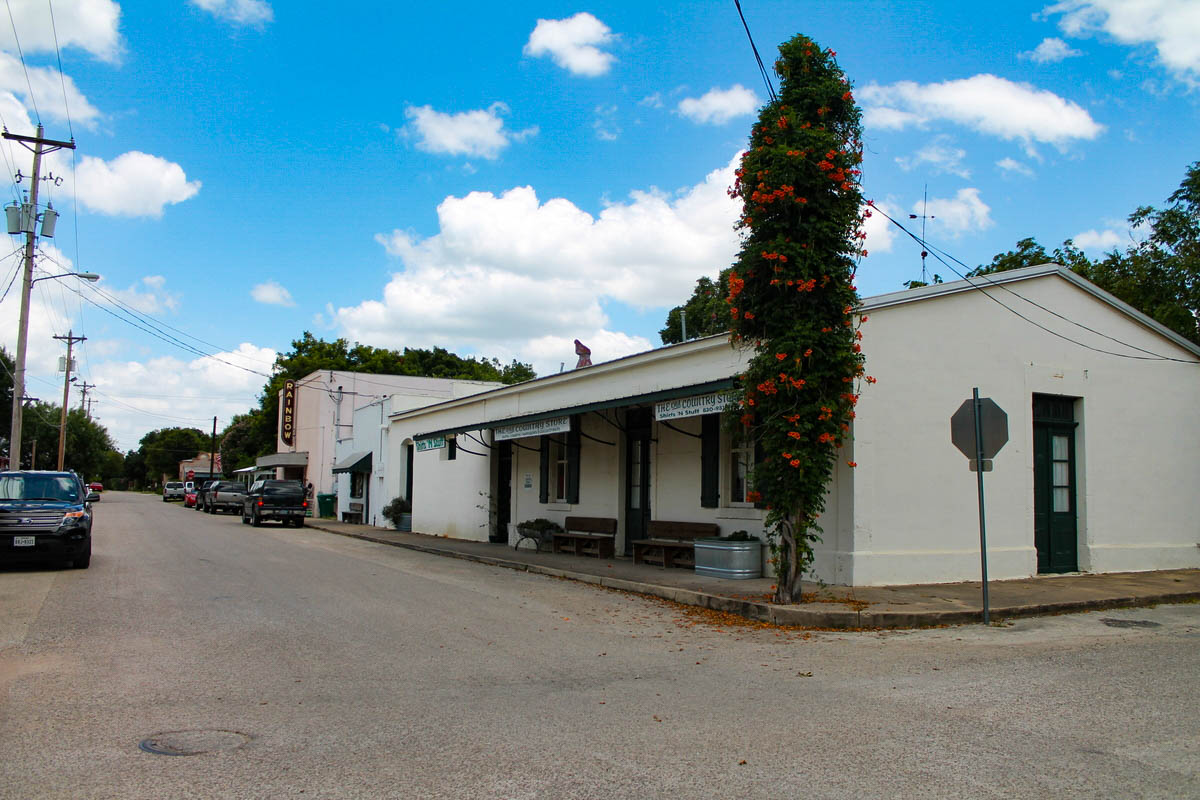
Downtown Castroville, Texas
