= Philippe Juvin =

French medical doctor and politician (born 1964)

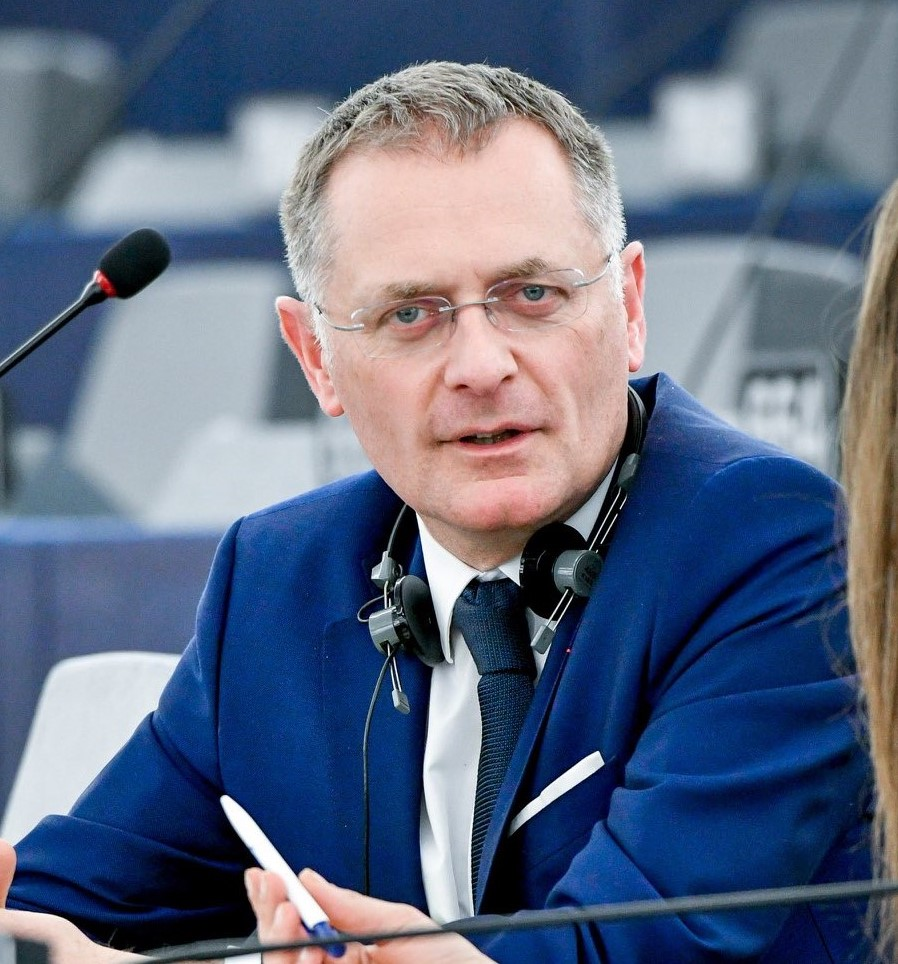
- Juvin in 2019

Member of the National Assembly for Hauts-de-Seine's 3rd constituency
- Incumbent
- Assumed office 22 June 2022
- Preceded by: Christine Hennion

Mayor of La Garenne-Colombes
- In office 11 March 2001 – 8 July 2022
- Preceded by: Max Catrin
- Succeeded by: Monique Raimbault

Member of the European Parliament
- In office 14 July 2009 – 1 July 2019
- Constituency: Île-de-France

Member of the Regional Council of Île-de-France
- In office 2 July 2021 – 6 July 2022

Personal details
- Born: 1 February 1964 (age 62) Orléans, France
- Party: Rally for the Republic (until 2002); Union for a Popular Movement (2002–2015); The Republicans (2015–present)
- Education: Paris Diderot University
- Profession: Physician

Philippe Juvin (French: [filip ʒyvɛ̃]; born 1 February 1964) is a French medical doctor and politician of The Republicans (LR) who served as a Member of the European Parliament (MEP) from 2009 until 2019 for the Île-de-France constituency.

The head of the Emergency Department of the European Research Hospital Georges Pompidou, Juvin held the mayorship of La Garenne-Colombes, a Parisian suburb, from 2001 to 2022 and was briefly a member of the Regional Council of Île-de-France in 2021–2022. In 2022, he was elected to the National Assembly in the 3rd constituency of Hauts-de-Seine.

In December 2021, Juvin ran for his party's nomination for President of France in the 2022 presidential election, placing fifth. On 3 April 2022, he revealed that he had temporary left France for Ukraine, to help medical staff and teach war medicine amid the Russian invasion of Ukraine.

== Medical career ==
Juvin is a Medical Doctor (MD), Professor of University since 2003, specialising in Anaesthetic and Intensive Care. He was a resident in the Île-de-France area (1989), Clinic Head of the Universities at the Bichat–Claude Bernard Hospital (1993–1995), then a hospital practitioner at the Bichat Hospital (1995–2003). Moreover, he is a physician doctor (cardiac and respiratory cellular physiology) and a graduate in Forensic Medicine and Legal Compensation of Bodily Injury. He is a Director of Emergency Medicine Teaching at Paris Diderot University (Emergency Medicine Certificate). He introduced Forensic Medicine teaching (1997–2003) within Bichat University.

Juvin is currently Head of the Emergency Department of the European Research Hospital Georges Pompidou in Paris, where he was appointed after a selection procedure that started in March 2010. Previously Head of the Emergency Department of the Beaujon Hospital, his department was rewarded for the excellent quality of its organisation (notably, a drastic decrease in patients' waiting time); it has been held up as an example by the French National Authority for Health, the press (Time, Le Parisien), as well as a reference model in terms of organisation of emergency departments in Peter Gumbel's book French Vertigo. The Beaujon Emergency Department is ranked among the four best emergency departments of Île-de-France according to L'Express in 2011.

Juvin is a reserve officer within the Paris Fire Brigade where he is regularly on duty as a doctor. He furthermore took part in OPEX; in 2008 he was on a mission for a few months in Afghanistan as anaesthetist within the French forces of the International Security Assistance Force (ISAF) and North Atlantic Treaty Organization (NATO) fighting the Taliban. He went several times to the Middle East as part of his function as a Member of the European Parliament.

On 3 April 2022, Juvin made known to have temporarily left France for Ukraine. He positively answered to the solicitation of "Ukrainian colleagues", whose "courage" he saluted, to help the medical staff and teach war medicine to soldiers, doctors and civilians.

== Political career ==
=== Early beginnings ===
Juvin was president of the Union of Youths for Progress, a left-wing Gaullist youth movement, between 1989 and 1995. As a member of the Rally for the Republic, he joined the Union for a Popular Movement (UMP) in 2002. He has since held executive position within the UMP's Hauts-de-Seine section.

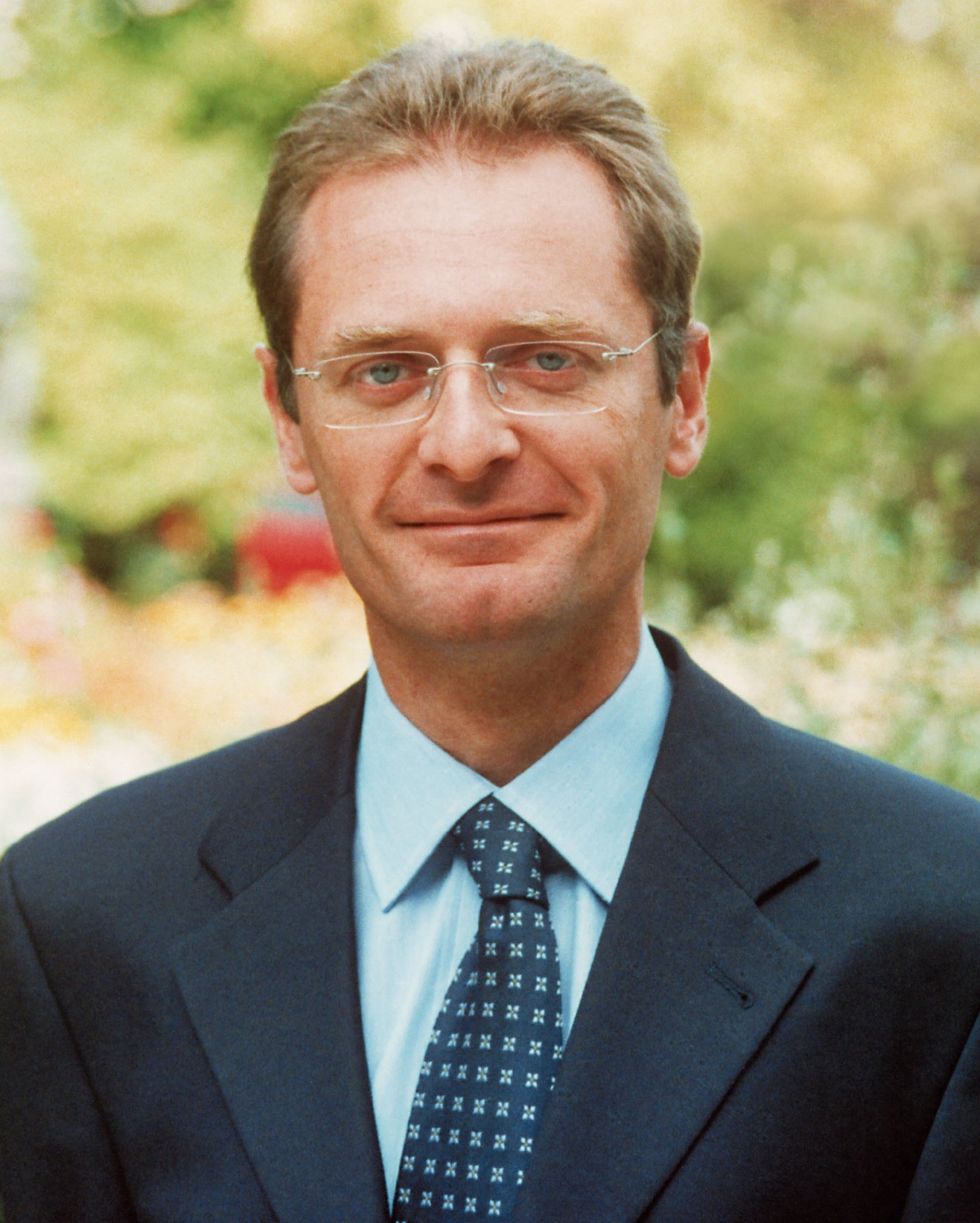
Juvin in 2001

Town Counsellor of La Garenne-Colombes at 19 years old, Juvin was elected Mayor of this town in 2001. He has always been elected in his municipality (Mayor, Town Counsellor) in the first round, with 54% of votes in 2001, 58% in 2004 (administrative district elections) and 67% in 2008.

Vice-President of the Hauts-de-Seine Departmental Council from 2004 to 2009 (under the Presidency of Nicolas Sarkozy), Juvin experimented the implementation of the RSA and of an Alzheimer departmental plan. He also implemented the return-to-work action plan of RSA beneficiaries, and tackled the issue of the schooling of disabled children. All those measures have been later on taken up at national level.

Juvin is currently UMP Political Advisor after having been National Secretary in charge of Professional Federations and National Secretary in charge of Health, Solidarity and Disability.

He was the Mayor of La Garenne-Colombes, where he was first municipal councillor between 1983 and 2001 before being elected mayor that same year and easily re-elected in 2008. Since his election, he launched 4 twinning programmes for the city of La Garenne-Colombes with Valpaços (Portugal) in 2004, Yoqneam (Israel) in 2006, Clarksville (United States) in 2008 and Daroun-Harissa (Lebanon) in 2011.

=== Member of the European Parliament, 2009–2019 ===
In the 2009 European elections, Juvin was the fifth candidate on the Union for a Popular Movement list in the Île-de-France region, and was elected to the European Parliament.

Juvin was a Member of the European Parliament from 2009 until 2019. He served on the Committee on the Internal Market and Consumer Protection and of the Committee on the Environment, Public Health and Food Safety. He was furthermore Vice-President of the inter-parliamentary delegation for the relations between the EU and Afghanistan, and a member of the inter-parliamentary delegation for the relations between the EU and Iran.

Juvin served as rapporteur for the European Parliament on a directive on the award of services and works concession contracts and works for the EPP on the regulation on clinical trials. He was furthermore rapporteur for the European Parliament on the Impact of Advertising on Consumer Behaviour, and on electromagnetic fields, and worked as rapporteur for the EPP on a variety of files: the reinforcement of the rights of vulnerable consumers, the reduction of health inequalities within the EU, the establishment of a collective redress system at EU level, data protection, the reinforcement of the food supply chain in Europe and pharmacovigilance. Moreover, he was tasked by the French EPP Delegation to deal with the project of creation of a European Civil Protection Force.

In addition to his committee assignments, Juvin was Vice-President of an EPP internal think tank on the future of Internet ("Internet: Today and Tomorrow" Working Group).

After Michel Barnier's nomination as European Commissioner for Internal Market, Juvin ran to chair the UMP group of the PPE presidency. He was defeated with a wide majority on 9 February 2010, his colleagues electing Jean-Pierre Audy instead.

From June 2009 to January 2010, the date of his resignation of the General Council of the Hauts-de-Seine, Juvin kept his councillor's mandate looking till the definitive validation of the European elections of June 2009.

In response to France's anti-terrorism legislation allowing mass surveillance of suspected terrorists following the January 2015 Île-de-France attacks, Juvin and Thierry Solère sent a joint letter to President of the European Commission Jean-Claude Juncker warning that, without proper safeguards, the new intelligence measures would violate the Charter of Fundamental Rights of the European Union.

In 2016, Juvin supported Alain Lamassoure's candidacy for President of the European Parliament; the position eventually went to Antonio Tajani.

For the Republicans' 2016 primaries, Juvin endorsed Nicolas Sarkozy as the party's candidate for the 2017 presidential election. In the party's 2017 leadership election, he supported Laurent Wauquiez as new chairman. In 2018, Wauquiez included Juvin in his shadow cabinet; in this capacity, he served as opposition counterpart to Minister of the Armed Forces Florence Parly.

=== Candidacy for 2022 presidential election ===
In 2021, Juvin announced his intention to run as The Republicans' candidate in the 2022 presidential election.

During his campaign, Juvin defended the reduction of social security contributions, advocated the postponement of the retirement age to 65 and the extension of the legal working week. On the other hand, he stated not to be in favour of job cuts in the civil service. In the field of government, he proposed the introduction of migration quotas, the temporary withdrawal of France from the European Convention on Human Rights, the exclusion of migrants from all social assistance for five years, the introduction of minimum sentences, as well as wanted foreigners who commit serious offences to serve their sentences in their country of origin. Unlike his opponents within the party, he did not make immigration and security issues central to his platform, seeking to introduce the theme of public services into the political debate on the right. He was seen as the least economically liberal of the LR competitors for the party nomination.

At the party's 2021 congress, Juvin however failed to win sufficient support and subsequently endorsed Valérie Pécresse in the second round.

Ahead of the Republicans' 2022 convention, Juvin endorsed Bruno Retailleau for the party chairmanship; however, Éric Ciotti won the second-round vote. In 2023, Ciotti appointed Juvin as member of his shadow cabinet and put him in charge of health policy.

== Publications ==
- Notre Histoire, les cent dates qui ont fait la nation européenne, Paris, Éditions Jean-Claude Lattès, 2014, 250 p. (ISBN 978-2-7096-3448-9)
- Je ne tromperai jamais leur confiance, Gallimard, 2021, 304 p. (ISBN 978-2-07-293220-5)

== Recognition ==
- Knight of the National Order of Merit
- Knight of the Legion of Honour
- Knight of the Order of Academic Laurels
- French Commemorative Decoration Afghanistan and the International Security Assistance Force (ISAF) Decoration (NATO)
