= Haby =

Haby may refer to:

== People ==
- Charles Haby (1922–2006), French politician
- François Haby (1861–1938), German hairdresser
- Haby Niaré (born 1993), French taekwondo practitioner
- Jean-Yves Haby (born 1955), French politician
- René Haby (1919–2003), French politician

== Places ==
- Haby, Schleswig-Holstein, Germany
