= Christine Hennion =

French politician

Member of the Municipal council of Courbevoie
- Incumbent
- Assumed office 28 June 2020
- Mayor: Jacques Kossowski

Member of the National Assembly for Hauts-de-Seine's 3rd constituency
- In office 21 June 2017 – 21 June 2022
- Preceded by: Jacques Kossowski
- Succeeded by: Philippe Juvin

Personal details
- Born: 23 August 1955 (age 71) Roubaix, France
- Party: Renaissance
- Education: University of Lille

Christine Hennion (born 23 August 1955) is a French politician of La République En Marche! (LREM) who has been serving as a member of the French National Assembly between 2017 elections and 2022 representing the department of Hauts-de-Seine.

== Early life and education ==
Christine Hennion was born in Roubaix in 1955. She earned a Maîtrise in Chemistry from the University of Lille, a PhD of physics from Paris-Sud University and MBA from University of California.

== Political career ==
In parliament, Hennion serves as member of the Committee on Economic Affairs and the Committee on European Affairs. In addition to her committee assignments, she is a member of the French-Japanese Parliamentary Friendship Group. Since 2019, she has also been a member of the French delegation to the Franco-German Parliamentary Assembly. In July 2019, Hennion voted in favor of the French ratification of the European Union’s Comprehensive Economic and Trade Agreement (CETA) with Canada.

She has been a city councillor for Courbevoie since 2020.

== See also ==
- 2017 French legislative election
