= Kioumars Derambakhsh =

Iran film director and photographer

Kioumars Dermbakhsh
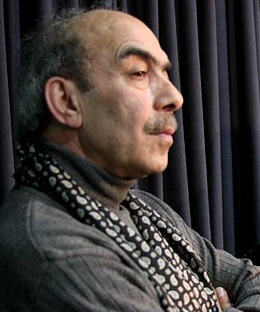
- Born: December 25, 1945; Tehran, Iran
- Died: March 31, 2020 (aged 74); Paris, France
- Occupation(s): director, photographer
- Spouse: Soraya Derambakhsh
- Children: Arash Derambarsh
- Relatives: Kambiz Derambakhsh

Kioumars Derambakhsh (Persian: کیومرث درم بخش; December 25, 1945, in Tehran – March 31, 2020, in Paris) was an Iranian filmmaker, producer, writer and photographer. He was the brother of Kambiz Darmakhsh, a well-known Iranian cartoonist. "Blind Owl + Life and Death of Sadegh Hedayat" starring Parviz Fanizadeh is one of the most famous films he has directed. He has made more than 100 documentaries and features films in European and Asian Countries since 1973.

== Life ==
Kioumars Derambakhsh moved to France in 1969 to study photography and cinema at the same time. Then he returned to Iran and started photographing in cinemas. Among his works in the field of photography, we can mention two films, Deer and Tangsir. Kioumars is known in the cinema as a writer, director, producer, editor, and photographer. He was a documentary filmmaker.

Arash Derambakhsh (French politician) is his son.

== Films ==
- The Bell (Jaras)
- The Blind Owl: Life and Death of Sadegh Hedayat (1975)
- The Spring Journey
- Sarbanan Kavir
- Iran is the land of religions
- The stone is raised
- Holy stone gardens
- Magical lithographs
- The Eclipse
- Boncou, Tribal Postman
- Heavenly migration
- Turkmen's Secrets
- Shepherd Man
- The World Is My Home
- Ascension (Rising to Heaven)
- The Color of Blood is Red
- Megalithic Mysteries
- Meeting Jesus Christ
- My Heart Bam
- Soil & Silk
- Voyage to Persia
- On the roof of Asia
- The Music Garden
- Fish & Stone
- The Oriental Dreams
- Secrets of Khaajoo Bridge
- Eight Edens
- Dream of an island
- Warning
- Bakhtiari
- Zaroastrian
- Blue Dream
- Vang Cathedral
- Secrets of Persepolis
- Qashghaie Tribe Bride
- Sunni Minority
- Wilderness Of Loneliness
- Pasargad
- The Iranian Lady
- The Garden of Paradise
- The Pigeon House Tower
- A 13-part series about the introduction of Iran's cultural heritage

== Death ==
Kioumars died of coronavirus 2020 in Paris, France, on April 3, 2016, at the age of 74.
