= Arash Derambarsh =

French editor and political activist

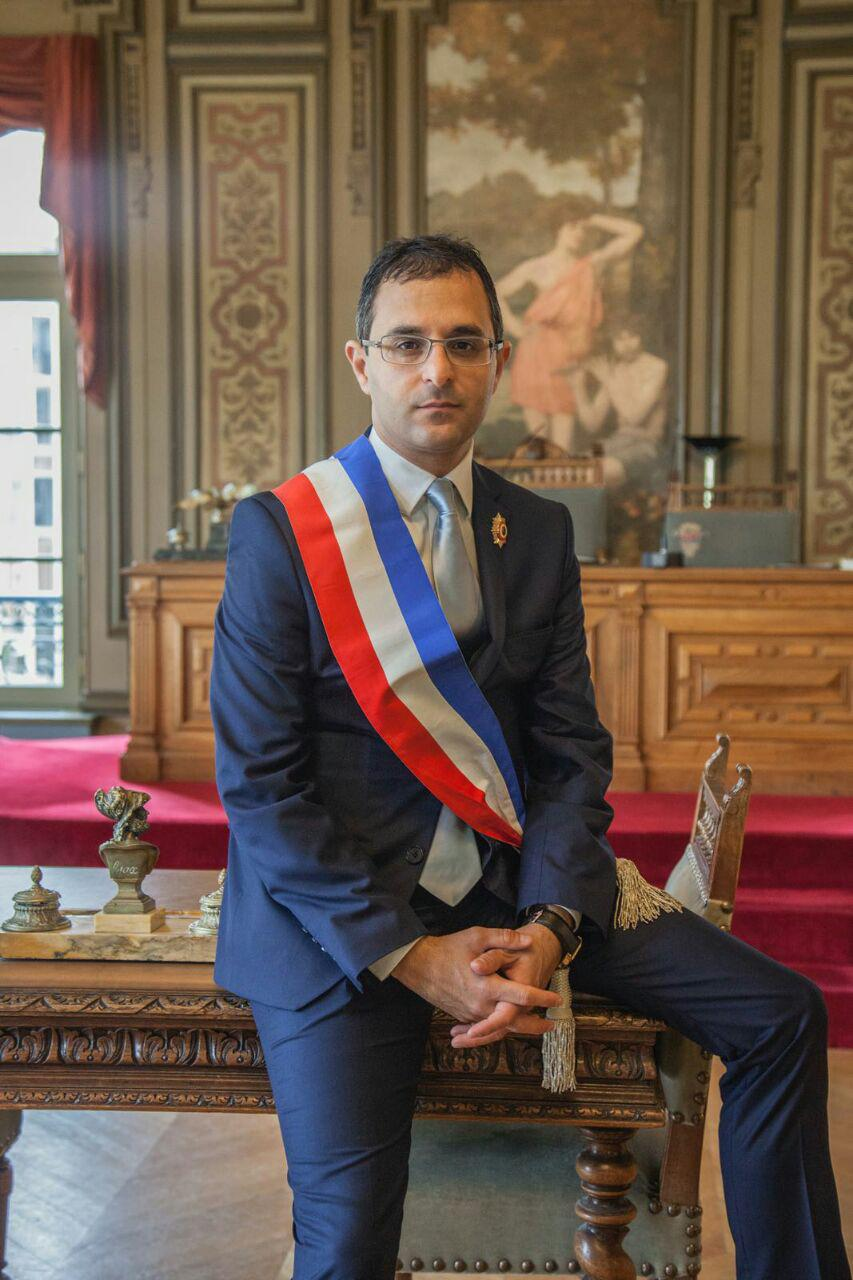

Personal details
- Born: 25 July 1979 (age 46) 13th arrondissement of Paris, France
- Relations: Kioumars Derambakhsh (Father)
- Occupation: Politician; Author
- Website: http://www.arashderambarsh.com

Arash Derambarsh (Persian: آرش درم‌بخش; born 25 July 1979) is a French editor, author, and debarred lawyer (technically, he was never a lawyer given that he joined the profession through fraud). He is a member of the City Council of Courbevoie, and an activist against food waste.

== Early life ==
Derambarsh was born on 25 July 1979 in Paris to Iranian parents.

== Controversies ==
=== Claim of being the new president of Facebook ===
In 2008 Derambarsh claimed to have been appointed president of Facebook and wanted to "speak to the world" but it was found to be a gross exaggeration and distortion of reality meant at gaining quick celebrity.

=== PhD nullified by Paris 1 University for plagiarism ===
Derambarsh enrolled in a PhD degree in 1998. In December 2015, after having been rejected from University of Paris II Panthéon-Assas in his PhD studies, he obtained a PhD in Law from University of Paris 1 Pantheon-Sorbonne. This allowed him to join the bar without passing the bar exam, which he had previously failed thrice, the maximum number of trials allowed. The PhD manuscript was very unusually made secret to the public until 2047, on the grounds that it allegedly contained top secret content.

An anonymous Twitter account nonetheless obtained a copy of the manuscript and argued that 95% of the thesis had been plagiarised, and that hundreds of pages did not have any footnotes. This triggered an enquiry from the disciplinary section of the academic council of the University of Paris 1. On 10 July 2020, it found that most of the dissertation was plagiarised, that Derambarsh improperly used allegations of confidential information to conceal his offense, and that at least 76% of the thesis was copy and pasted without quotation marks. Derambarsh additionally produced falsified versions of the thesis before the Disciplinary Section of the Academic Council. The disciplinary section also found that the jury was illegally composed, because it only included one full professor of law instead of the required 50% of the members minimum. The jury was found also improper in that none of the members, including the thesis advisor, were remotely specialists of the subject of the dissertation. The president of the jury, Frédéric Lefebvre, is a politician from the same party as Derambarsh and was himself caught for plagiarism, for a book published by a publishing house owned by Derambarsh. Bruno Dondero, the thesis advisor at University of Paris 1 Pantheon-Sorbonne after Derambarsh was rejected from University of Paris II Panthéon-Assas, told the disciplinary section that all rules had been followed and that the missing mandatory report on the defense (which legally has to be entered into the academic record for a PhD to be valid) was in a computer that had been stolen. Derambarsh's PhD was consequently declared void and he was banned for life from registering in any French public university. His appeal of that decision was subsequently rejected and it is now final.

As a consequence of the cancellation of the PhD which allowed him to join the bar, the Paris bar has expelled him. He has appealed that decision and can keep working as a lawyer while the appeal is being considered. The university has referred the plagiarism case to the prosecutor office, which has opened a preliminary inquiry for forgery.

In its ruling of 14 December 2023, the Paris Court of Appeal upheld Arash Derambarsh's disbarment from the Paris Bar. He announced that he would appeal to the Court of Cassation. As the appeal does not have suspensive effect, the Court of Appeal's decision applies immediately.

=== Fighting against food waste ===
After being informed of the huge pile of food expired and dumped in the cities by supermarkets and people, he tried to give the food that is still usable to the poor. Derambarsh successfully gathered 210,000 signatures, with the help of his group, to bring a bill to the parliament. Eventually a bill was passed, requiring supermarkets that are larger than 400 square meters to give usable expired food to the poor or a fertilizer company for animal food instead of dumping it. Schools are also required to train children to consume food in the right way. For his work against food waste he was awarded the WIN WIN Gothenburg Sustainability Award and SEK 1 million in 2019. His debut book, Manifeste contre le gaspillage alimentaire is the story of a parliament representative who tries to keep large supermarkets from dumping their usable expired food. He won the Edgar-Faure award for the best political book of the year. He was named as one of the one top hundred thinkers of the world in 2016 by Foreign Policy. He wrote the book Tomber 9 fois, se relever 10 - Échec scolaire, ne jamais lâcher in 2019.

However, Arash Derambarsh's actual contribution to the French legislation on food waste has been repeatedly challenged: in April 2016, Libération republished a long article from Les Inrockuptibles insisting that Arash Derambarsh and the buzz around his action was just "a fraud" ("une imposture"). In July 2017, Arash Derambarsh consequently sued Laurent Joffrin, Libération's chief editor; however, on November 30, 2018, the complaint against Laurent Joffrin was discharged as Arash Derambash's lawsuit was considered to be null and void. The then Minister for the Food Industry, Guillaume Garot, had previously expressed his concern about Derambarsh's "unquenchable thirst for recognition by the media", as well as the concern of some associations about the dangers entailed by Derambarsh's "superficial" proposals.

== Awards ==
In 2019, Derambarsh was the winner of WIN WIN Gothenburg Sustainability Award.
