= Kambiz Derambakhsh =

Iranian cartoonist (1942–2021)

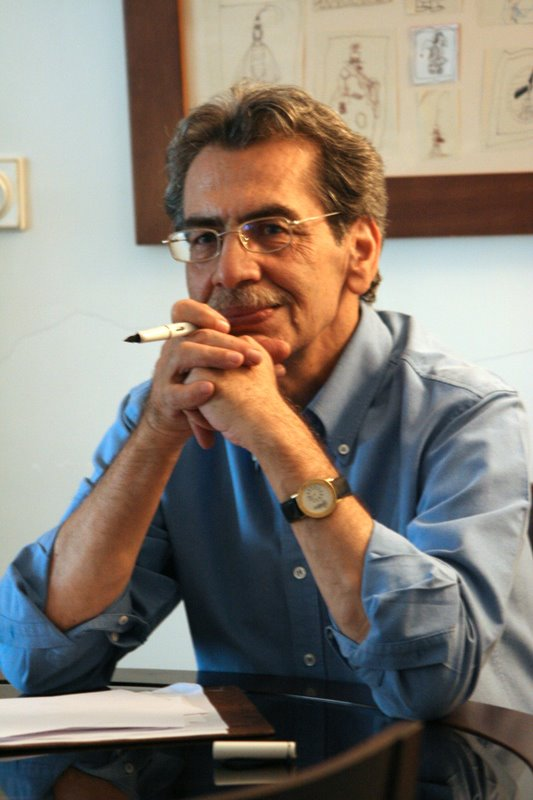
- Born: 29 May 1942; Shiraz, Iran
- Died: 6 November 2021 (aged 79); Tehran, Iran
- Occupations: Designer, cartoonist

Kambiz Derambakhsh (Persian: کامبیز درم بخش; 29 May 1942 – 6 November 2021) was an Iranian designer, illustrator and graphic artist.

== Biography ==
Derambakhsh was a graduate of the Tehran Academy of Fine Arts and started his collaboration with Iranian publications at the age of 14 and continued his work with Iranian and foreign press such as The New York Times, Der Spiegel, and Nebelspalter. He was one of the contributors of a Persian political satire magazine Towfigh. He won several major international awards and several independent exhibitions of his work have been held in various countries around the world and exhibited in authentic museums, such as the Academy of Arts in Saba House, the Museum of Contemporary Art in Tehran, the National Library of Iran, the Museum of the Graphic Designers of Iran, the Avignon Museum in Paris, the Cartoonmuseum Basel in Switzerland, and the House of Humour and Satire in Bulgaria, the Hiroshima Peace Memorial Museum in Japan, the Istanbul Cartoon Museum, the Anti-War Museum in Yugoslavia, the Römer (City Hall) in Germany and Museum of Caricature, Warsaw in Poland.

He was also a guest judge at international cartoon exhibitions in different countries. He received the Legion of Honour from the French government in November 2014.

Derambakhsh published several books about caricatures and illustrations including Untitled, Diary of Angels, Kambiz's book (published in Italy), joint books of satirists in Iran today, satirists in Iran today abroad, Mayazar Moori ke daneh kesh ast, Laughter Olympics, A symphony of lines, If Da Vinci had seen me and a few other books.

On 3 October 2016, at the closing ceremony of the Sixth International Festival of Art for Peace, Kambiz Derambakhsh and three other artists were awarded the Art of Peace Medal.

== Documentary ==
In 2016, a 70-minute documentary about the works and life of Derambakhsh, directed by Javad Atashbari, was published.

== Death ==
Derambakhsh was admitted to Atieh Hospital in Tehran on 1 November 2021, after contracting COVID-19 amid its pandemic in Iran. He died from the virus six days later, at the age of 79.
