= Jean-Yves Haby =

French politician

Member of the National Assembly for Hauts-de-Seine's 3rd constituency
- In office 12 June 1988 – 21 April 1997

Personal details
- Born: 5 January 1955 (age 71) Dombasle-sur-Meurthe, France
- Party: UDF
- Parent: René Haby (father)

Jean-Yves Haby (born 5 January 1955) is a French politician.

Haby was born on 5 January 1955, in Dombasle-sur-Meurthe. He was elected to the National Assembly between 1988 and 1997, representing Hauts-de-Seine's 3rd constituency on behalf of the Union for French Democracy.
